= Military ranks of Tunisia =

The Military ranks of Tunisia are the military insignia used by the Tunisian Armed Forces and the Tunisian National Guard. Tunisia shares a rank structure similar to that of France.

== Commissioned officer ranks ==
The rank insignia of commissioned officers.

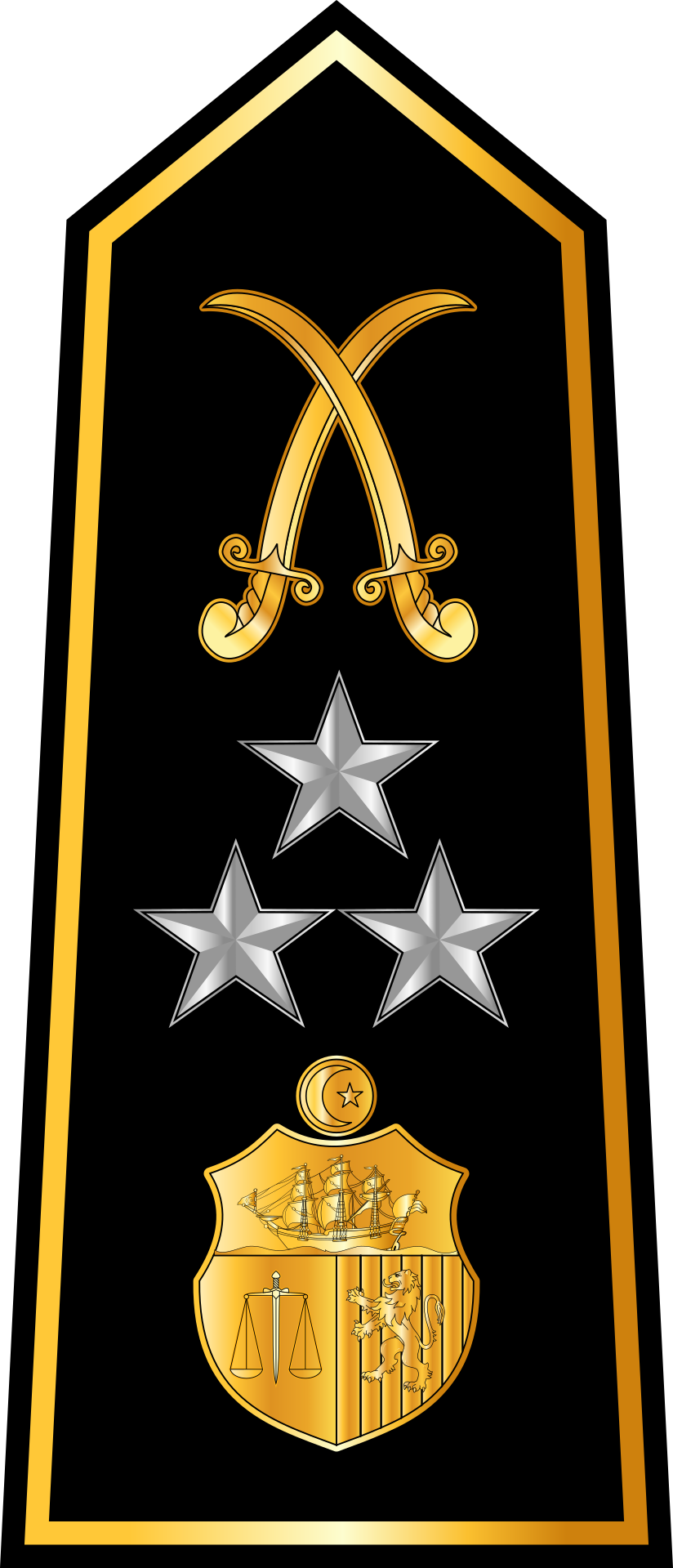
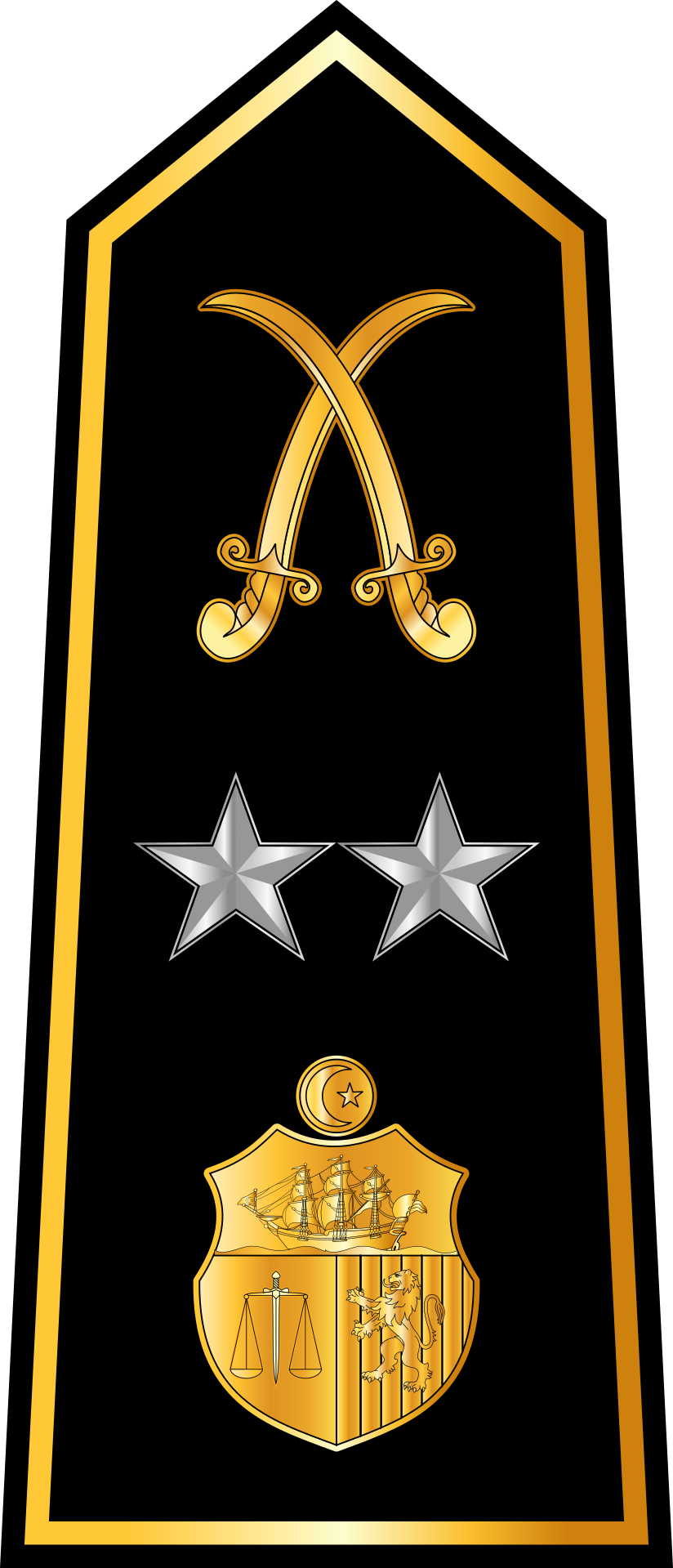
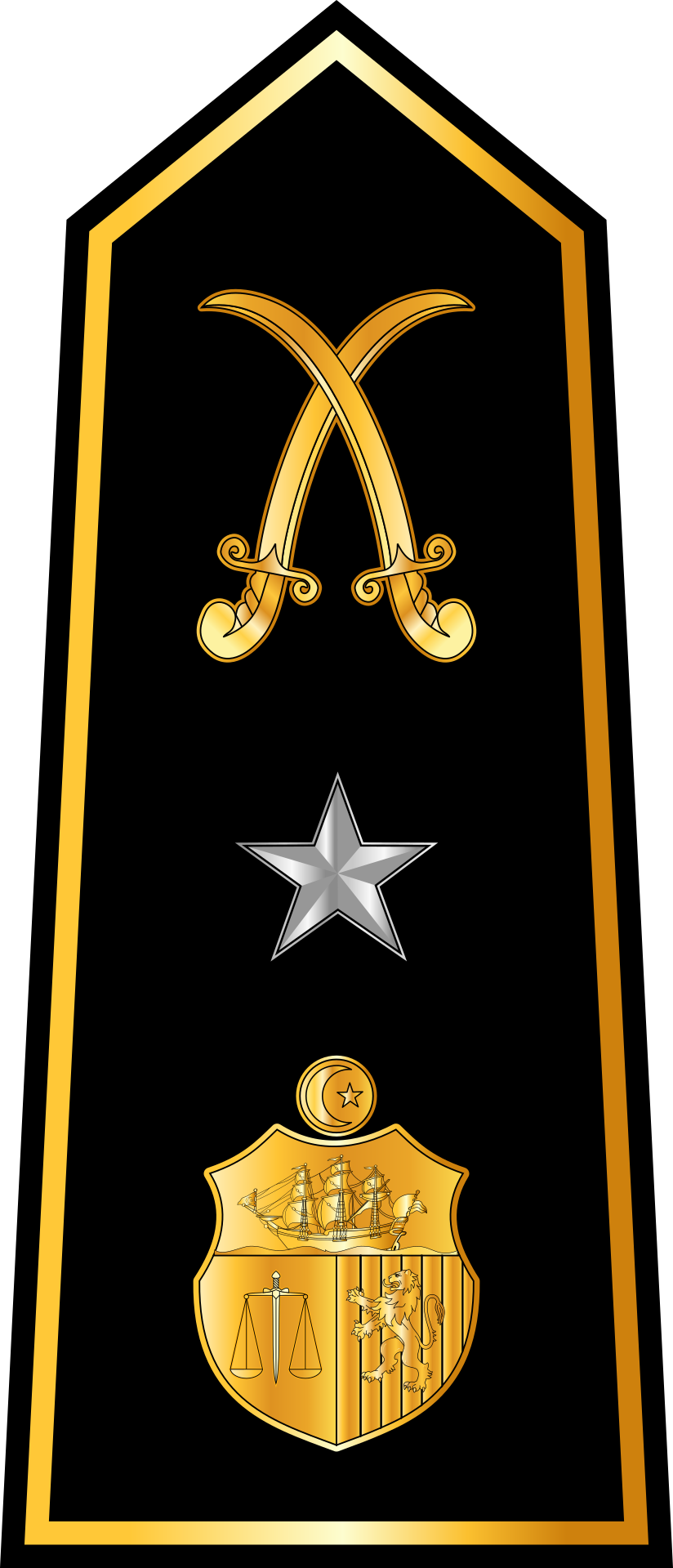
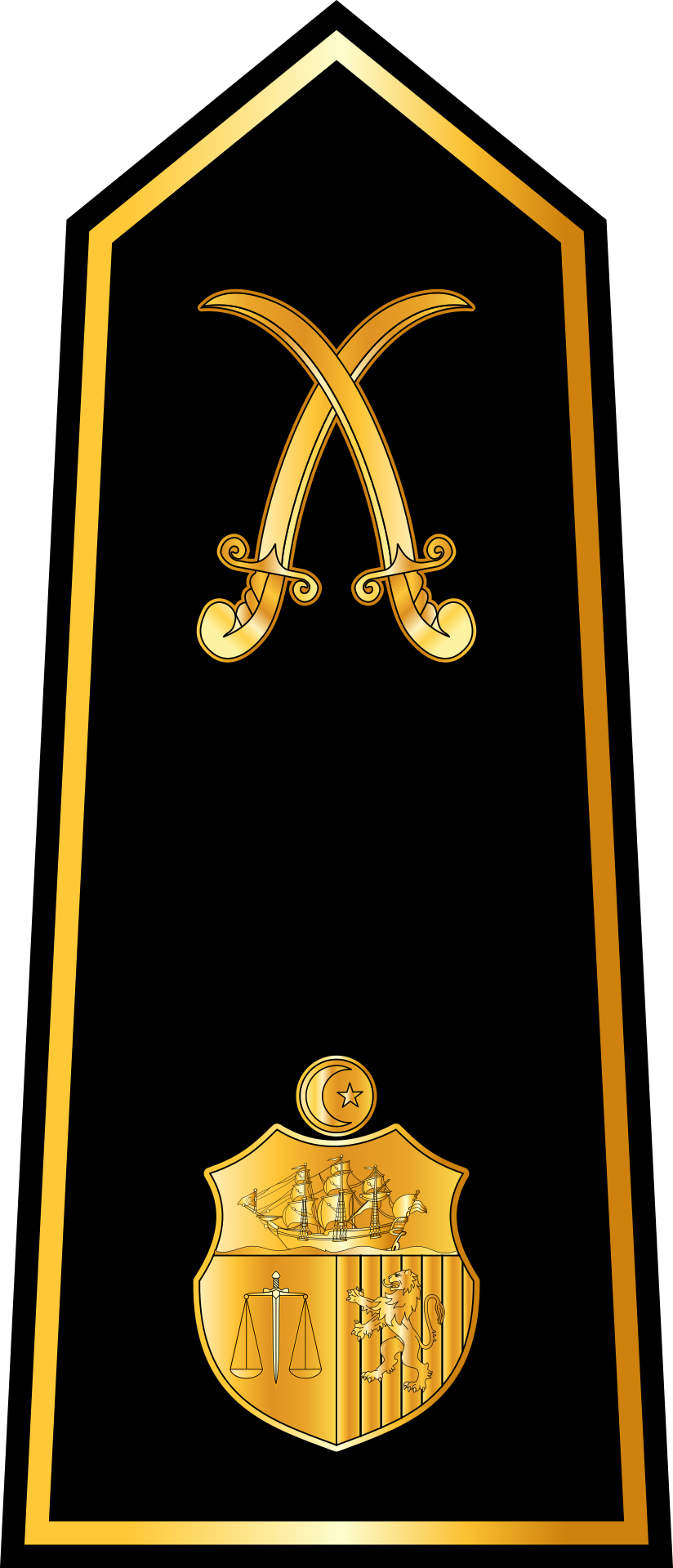
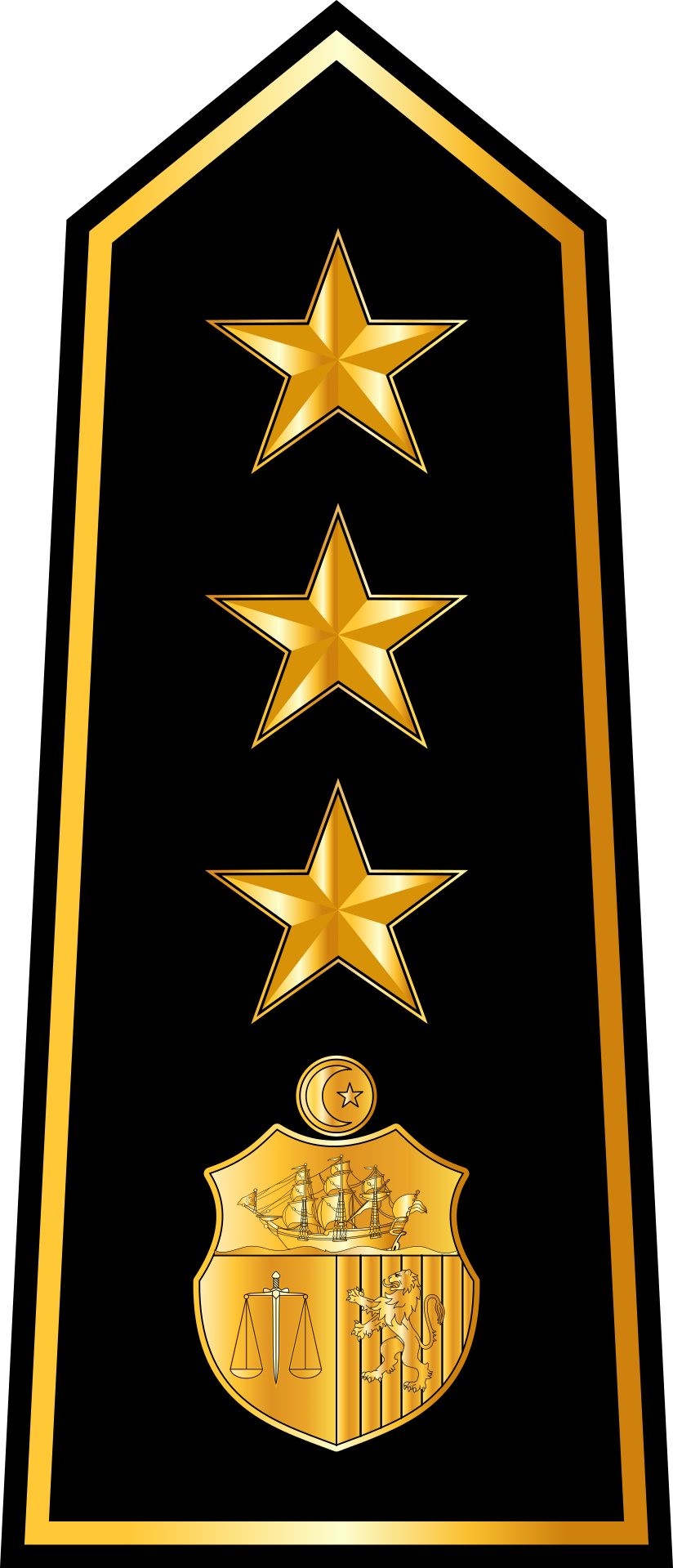
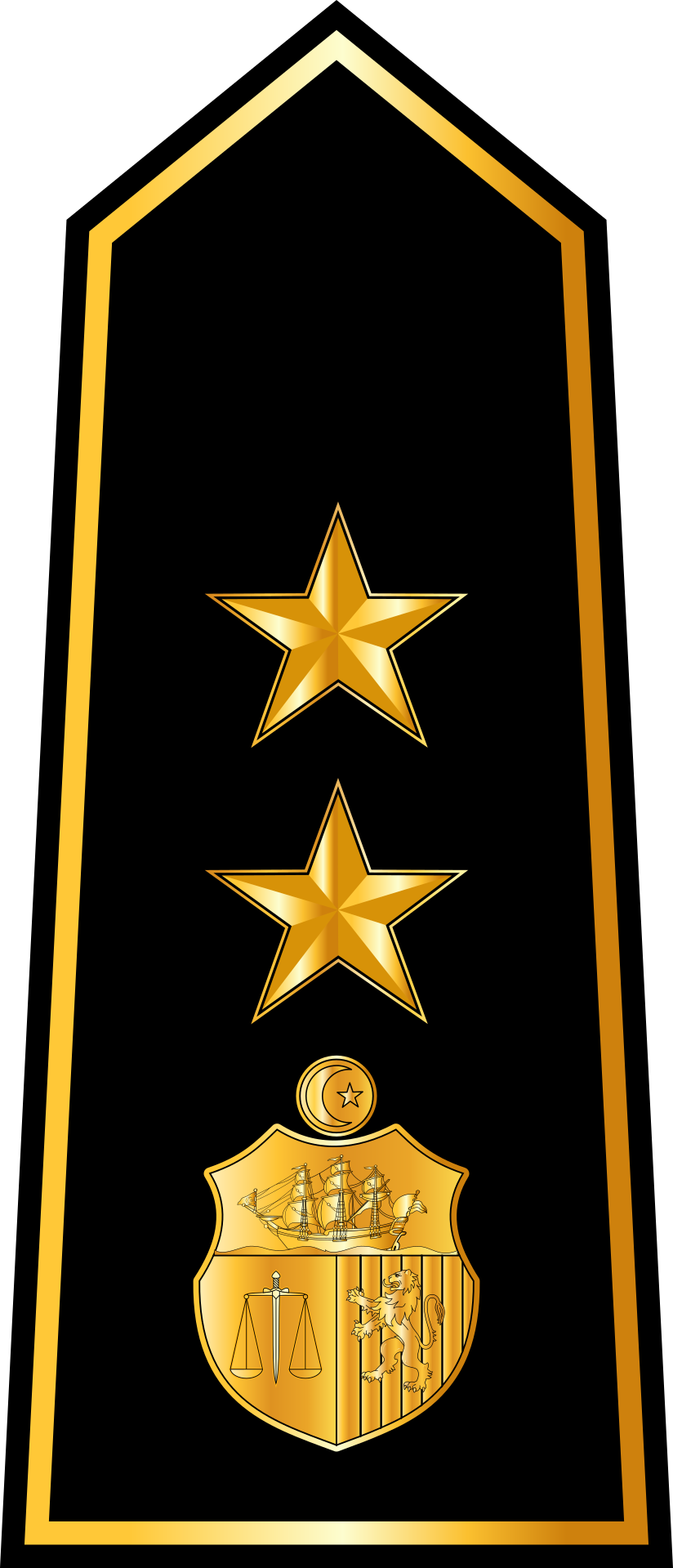
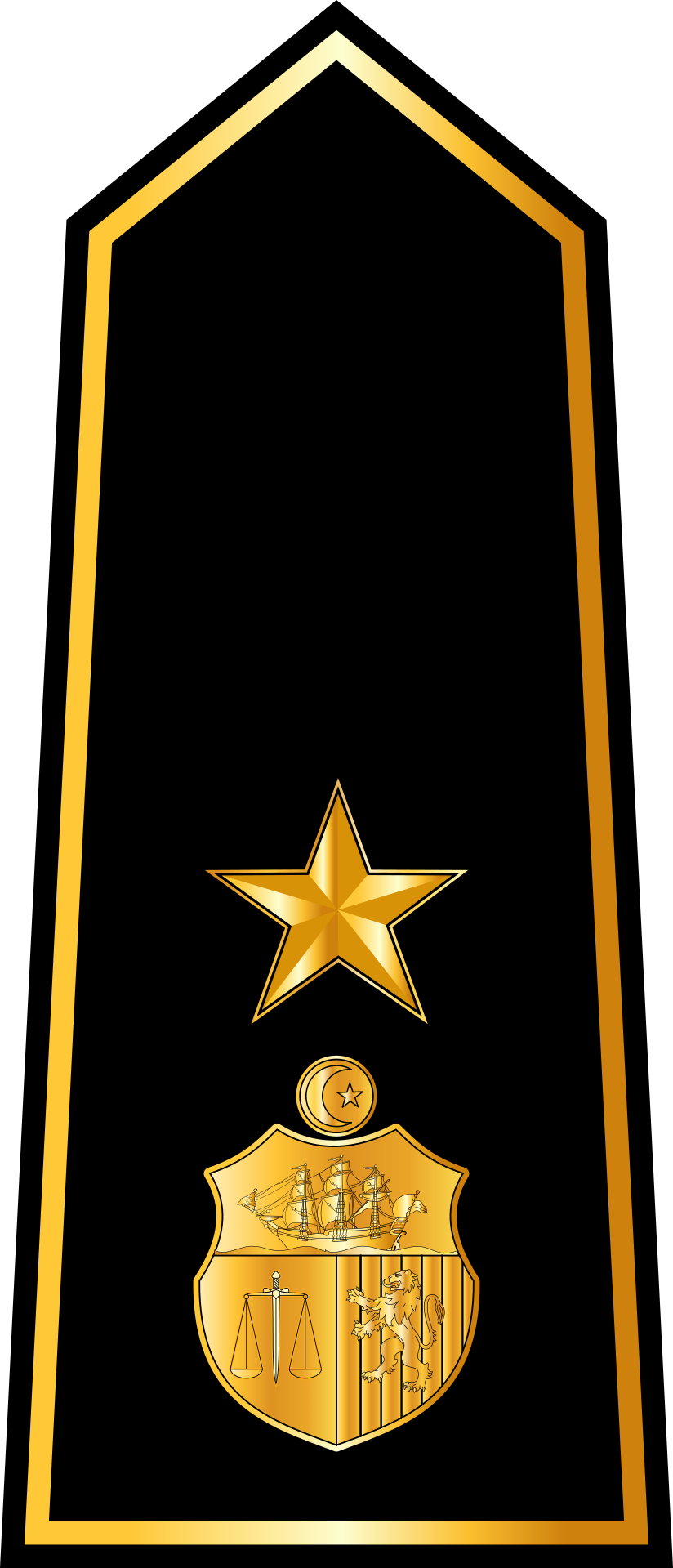
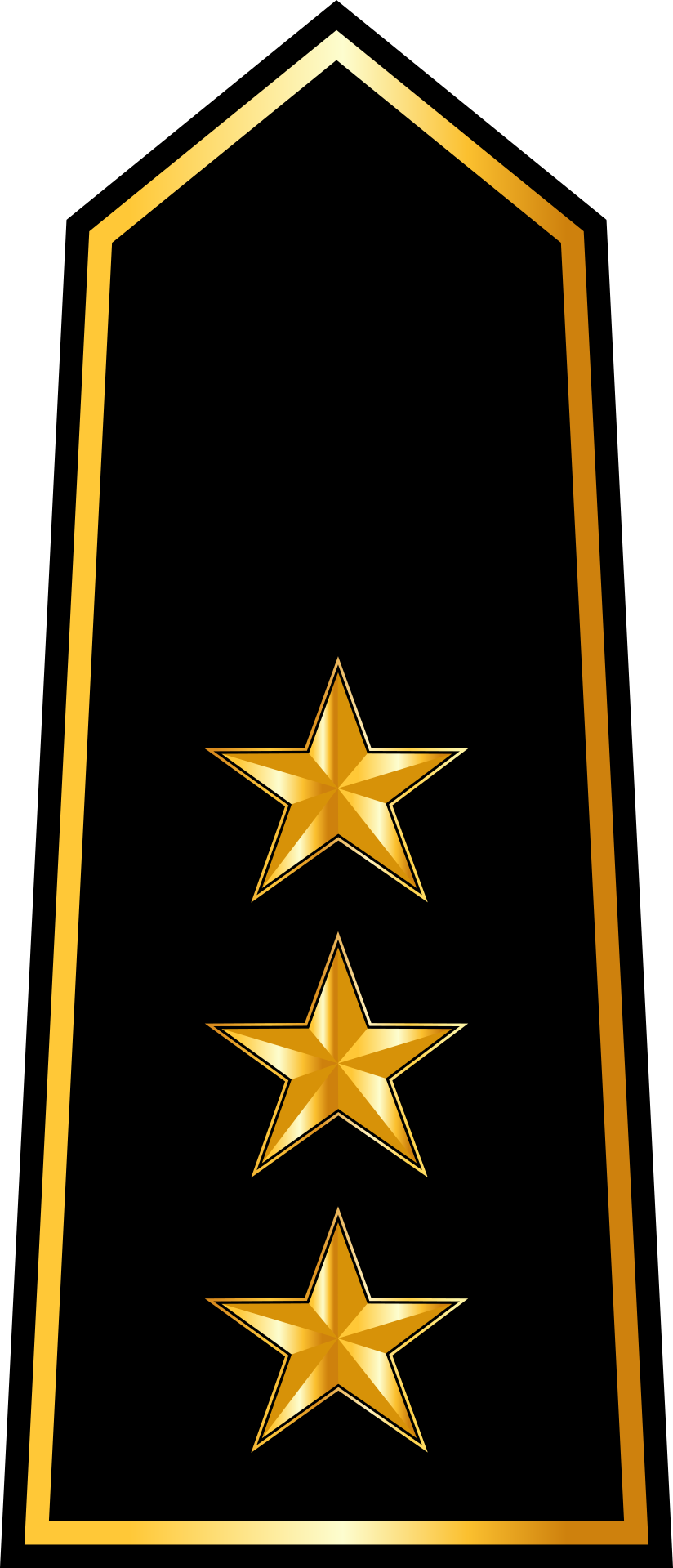
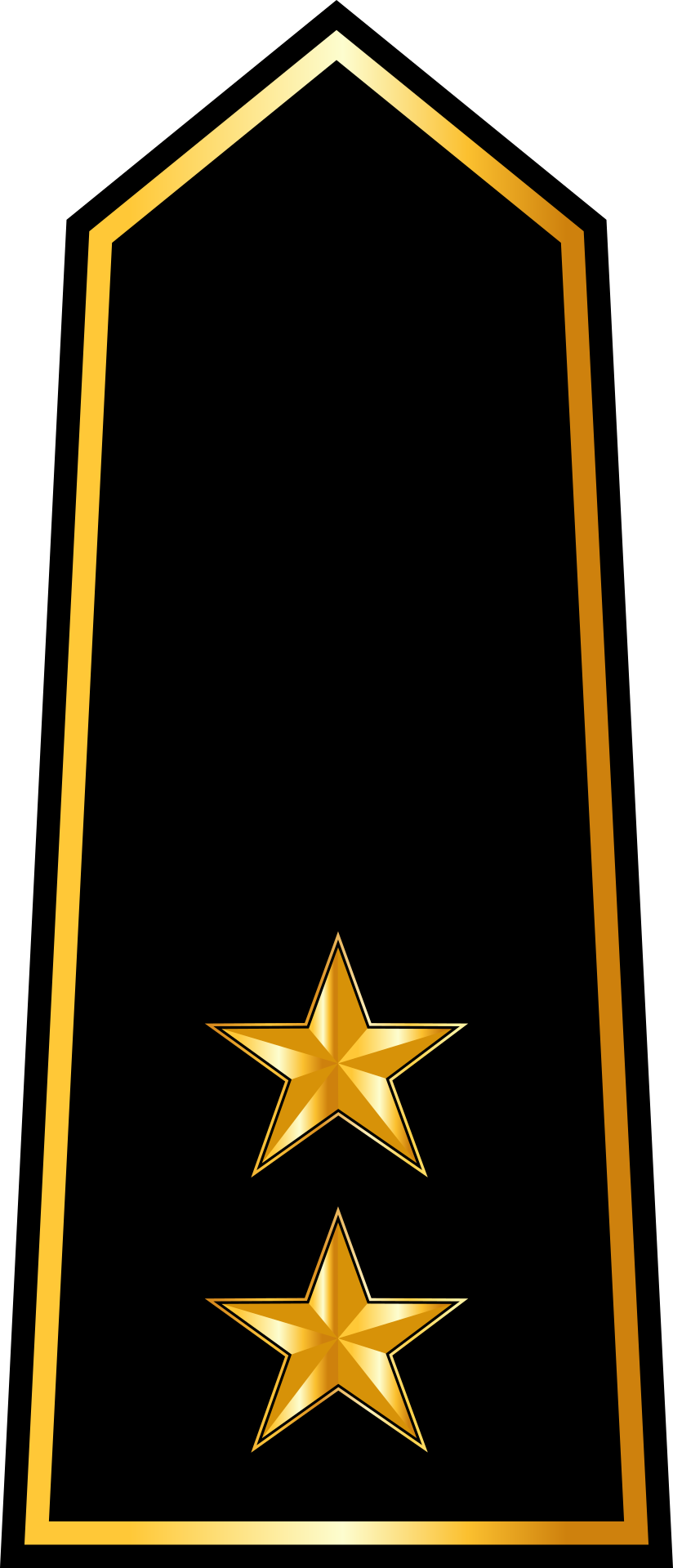
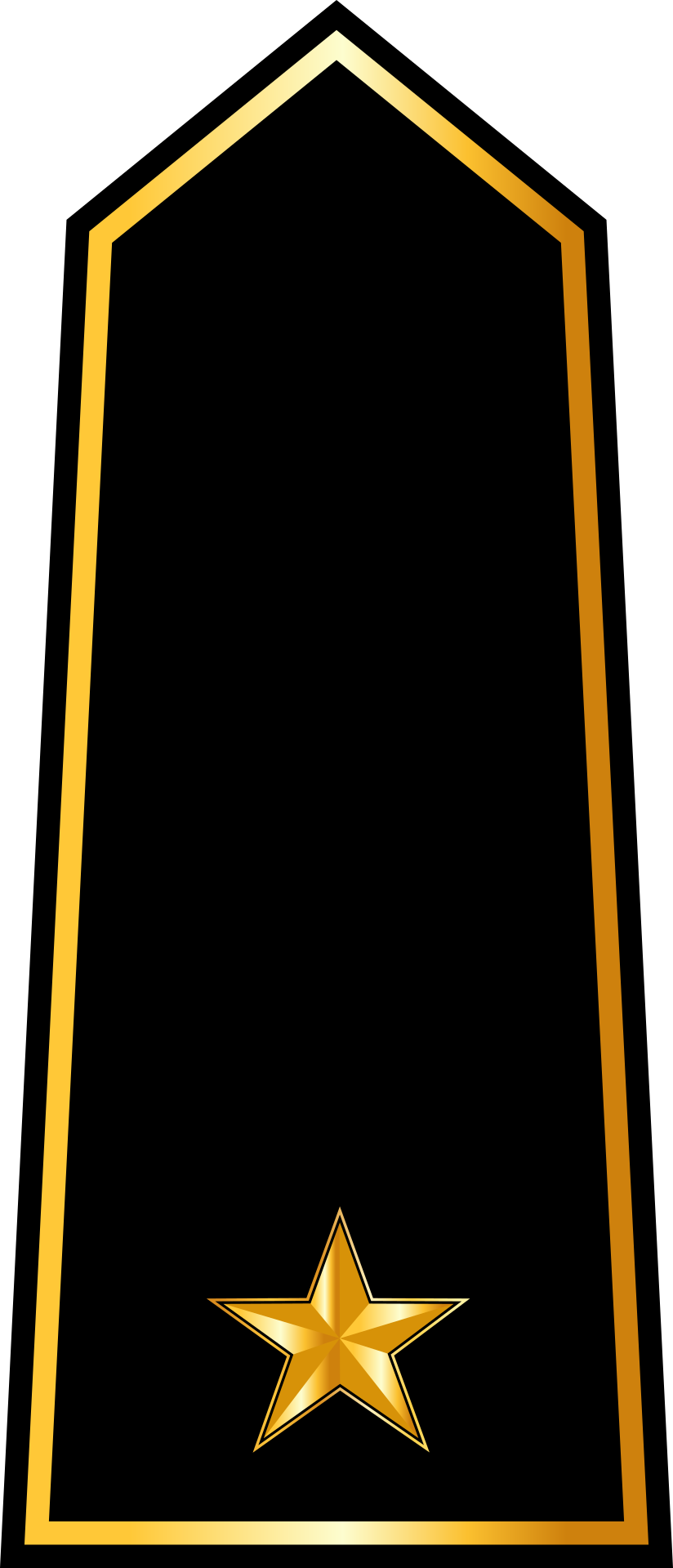
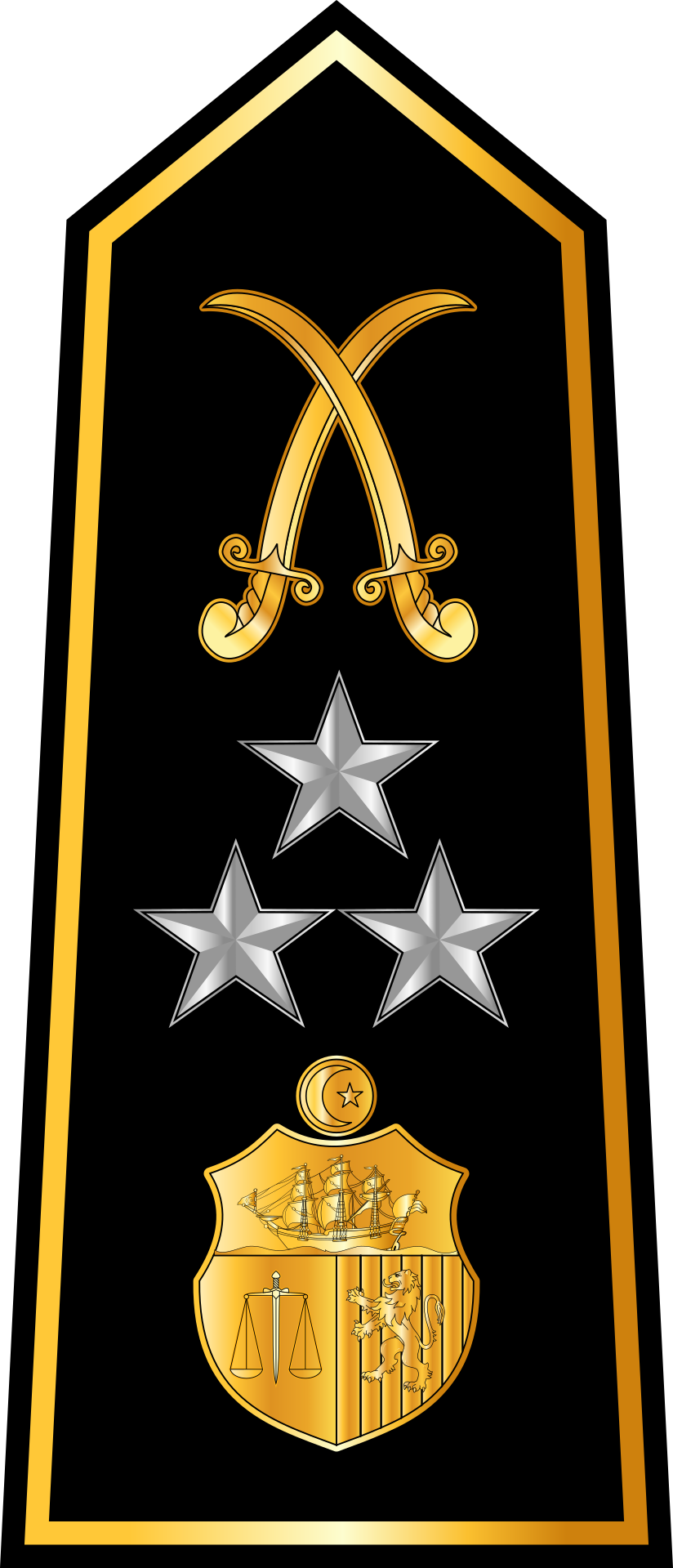
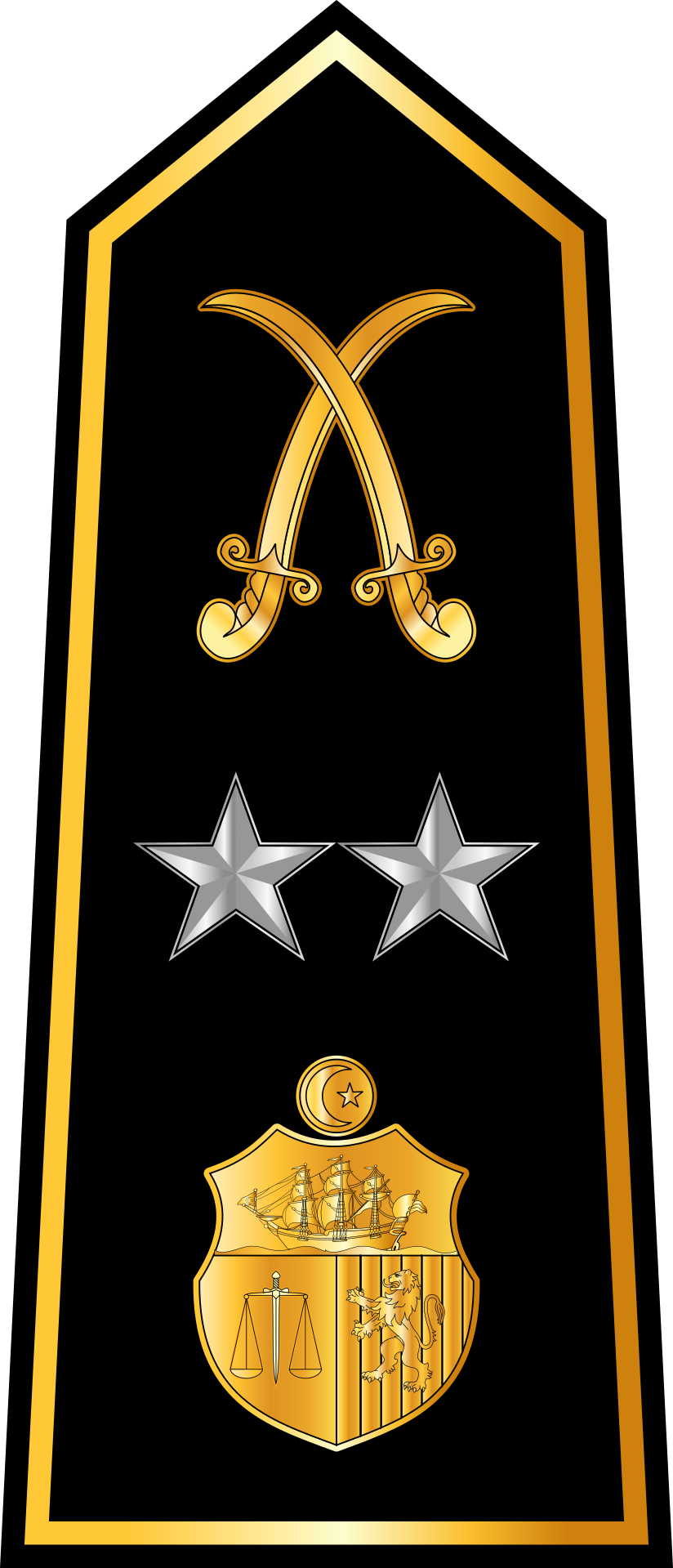
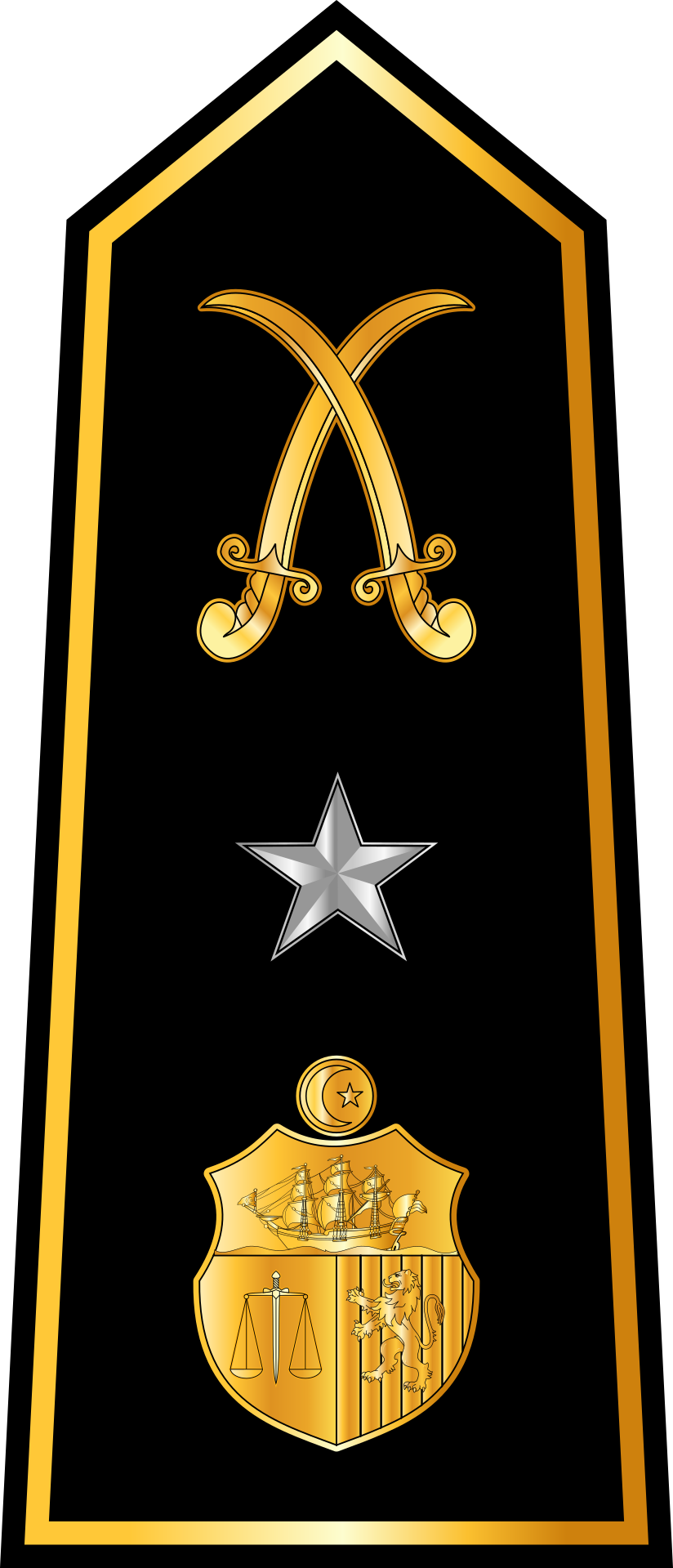
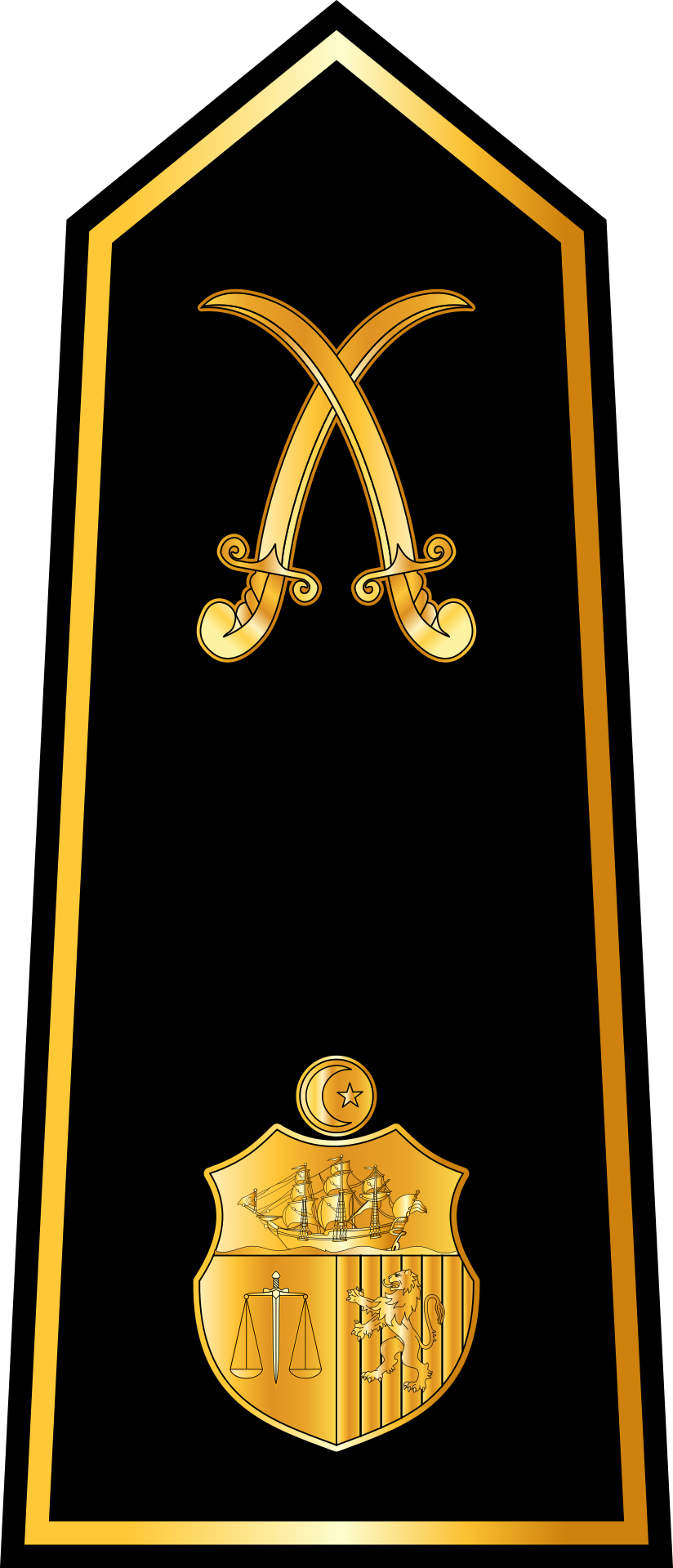
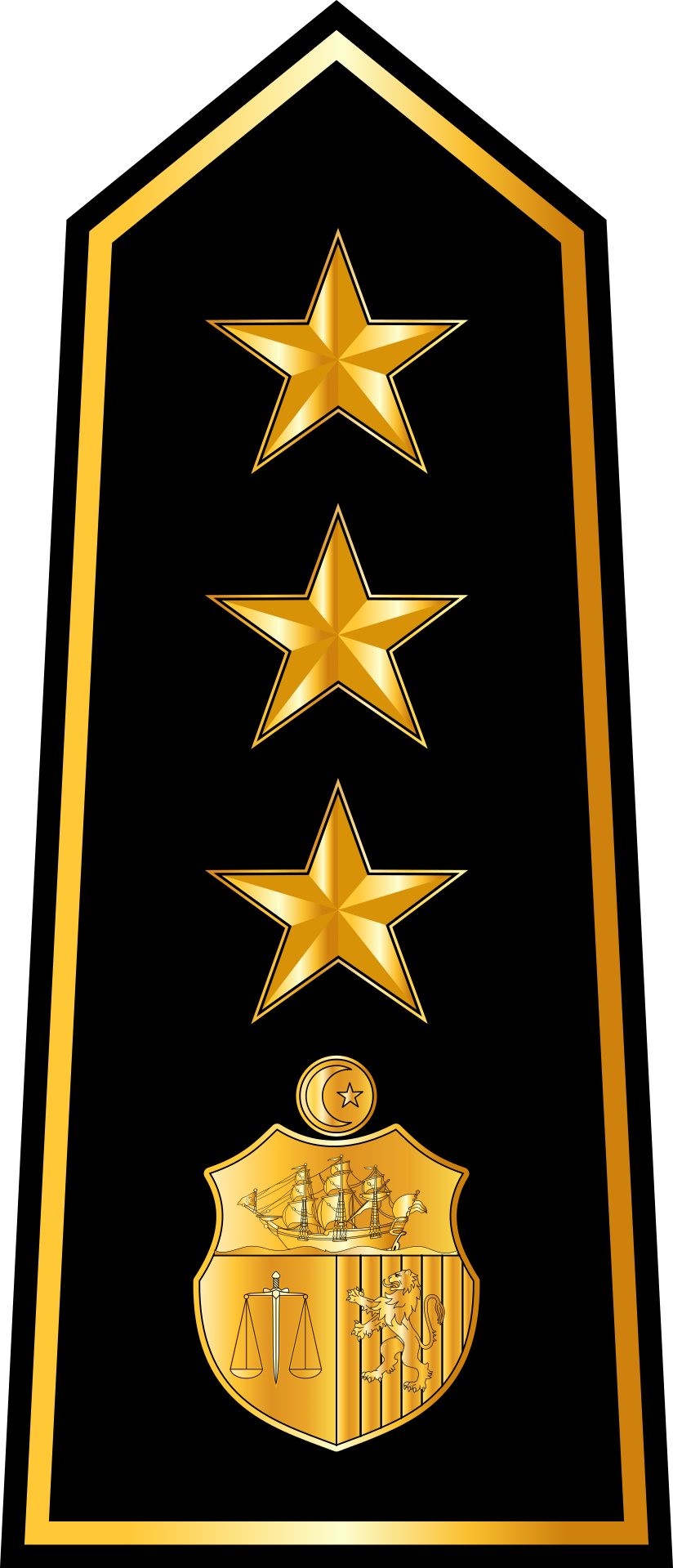
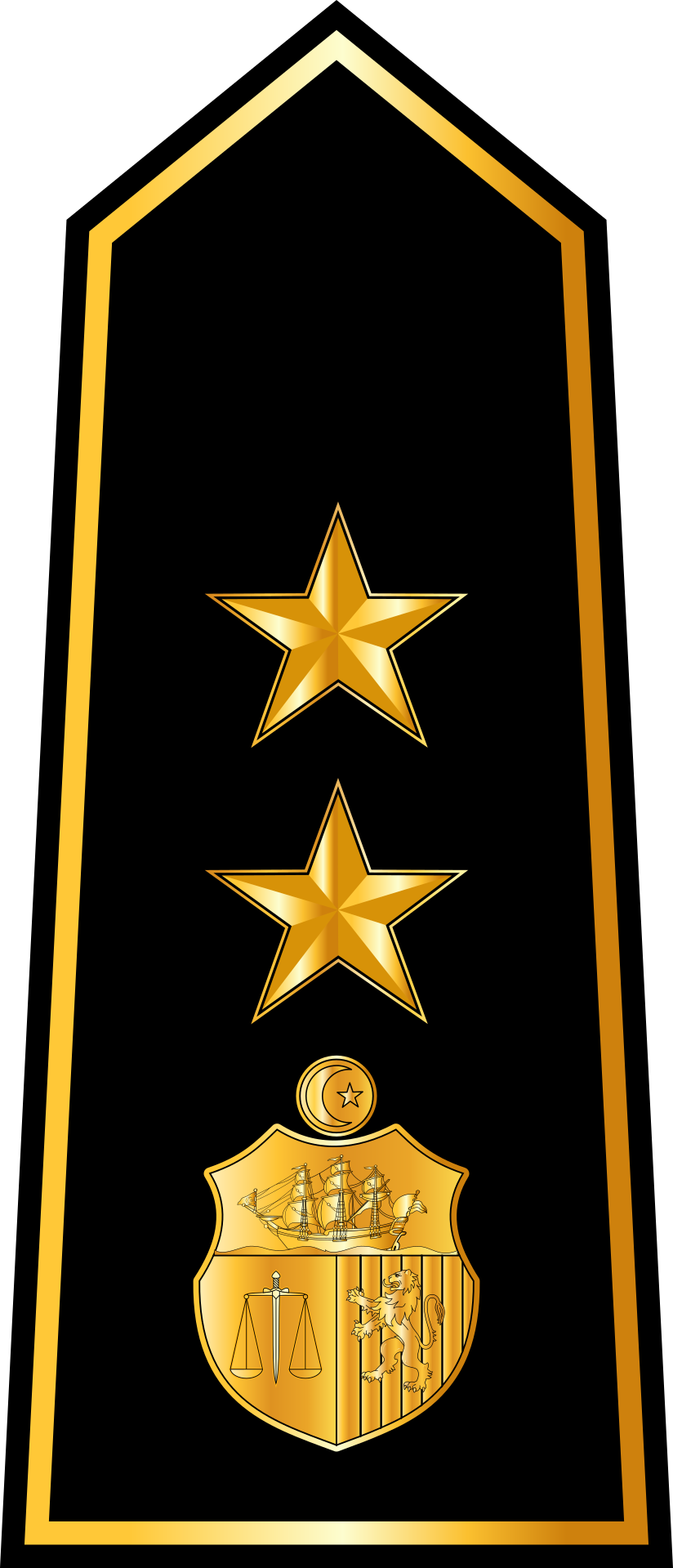
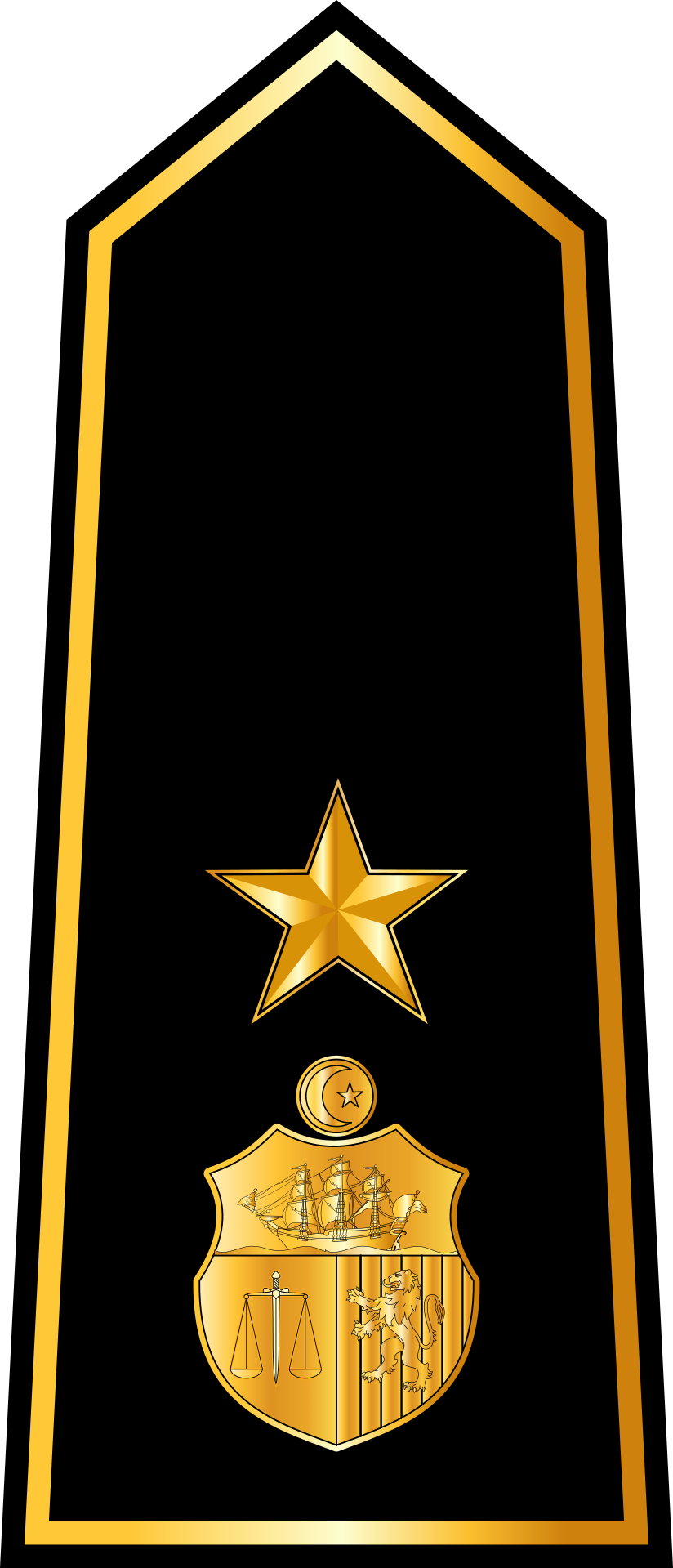
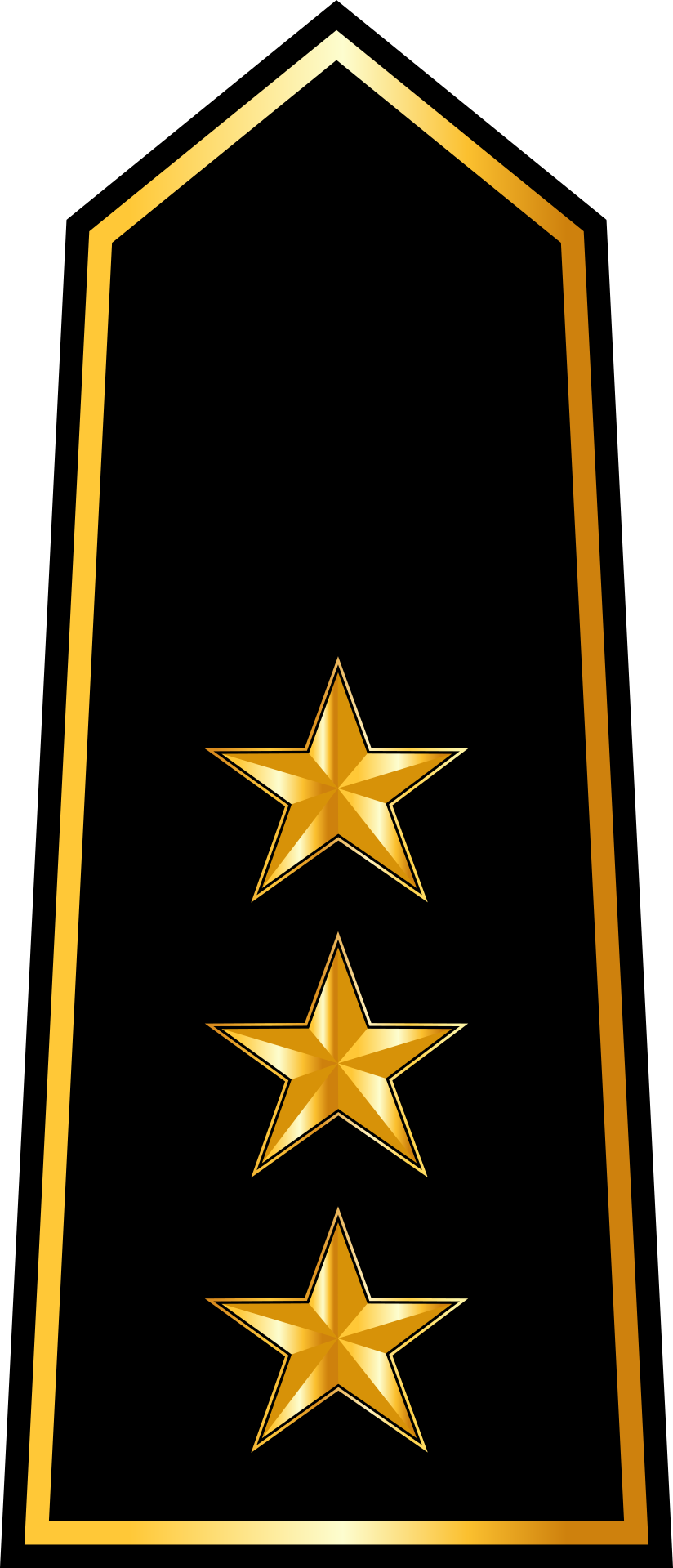
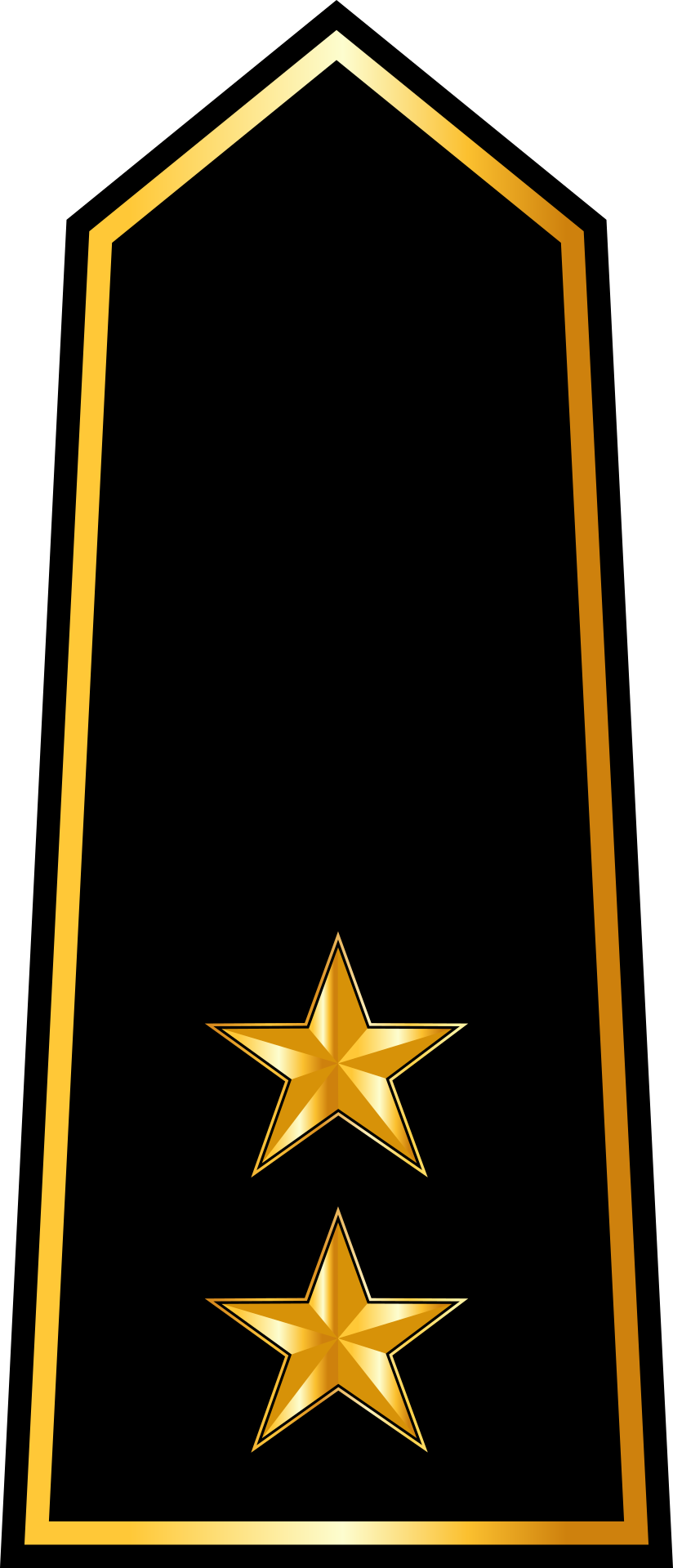
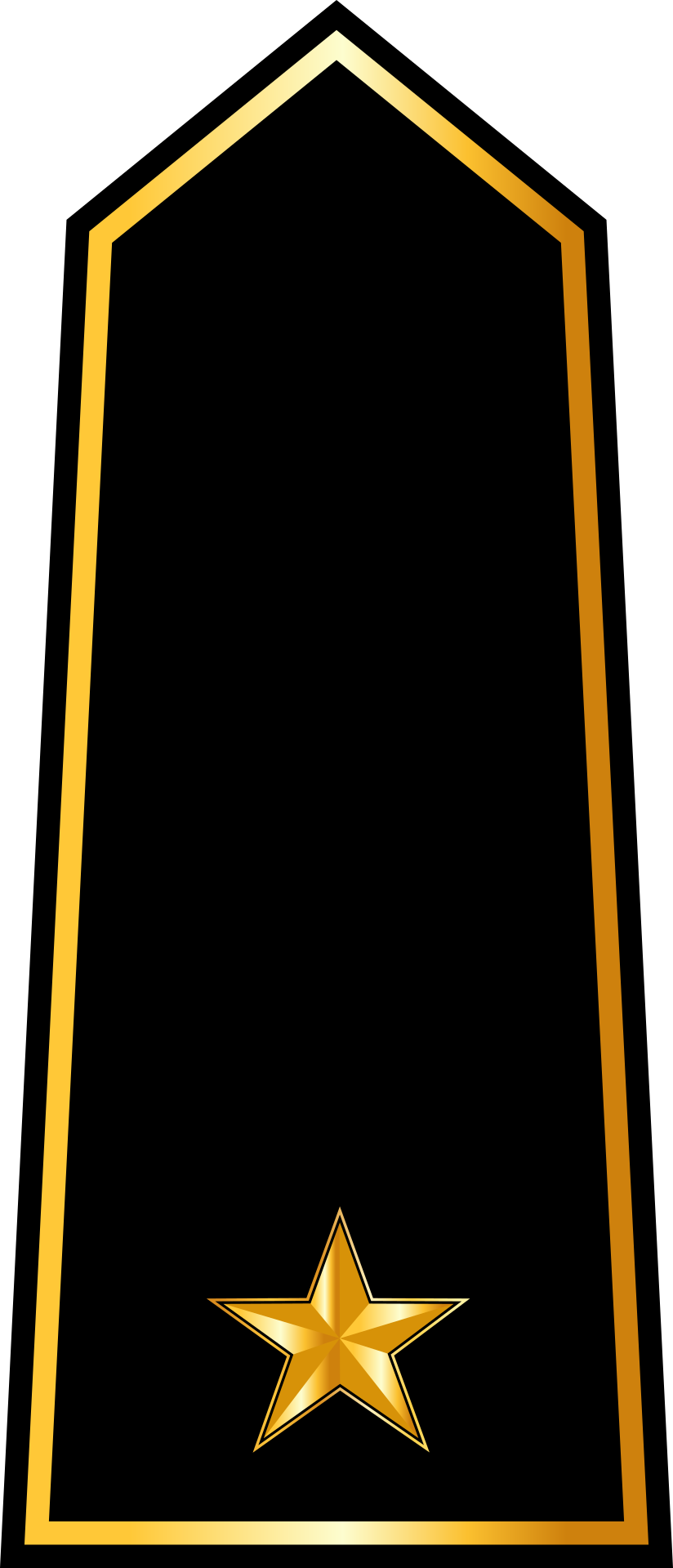
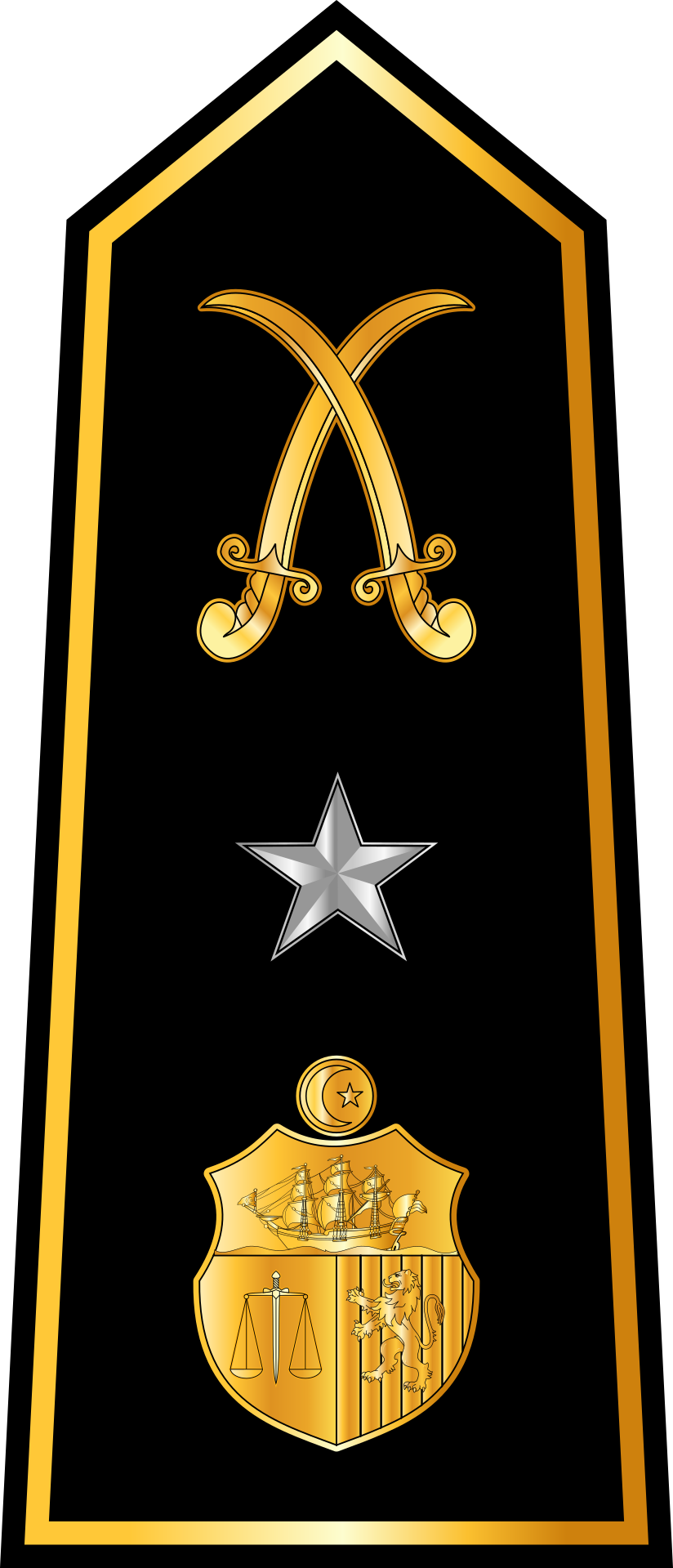
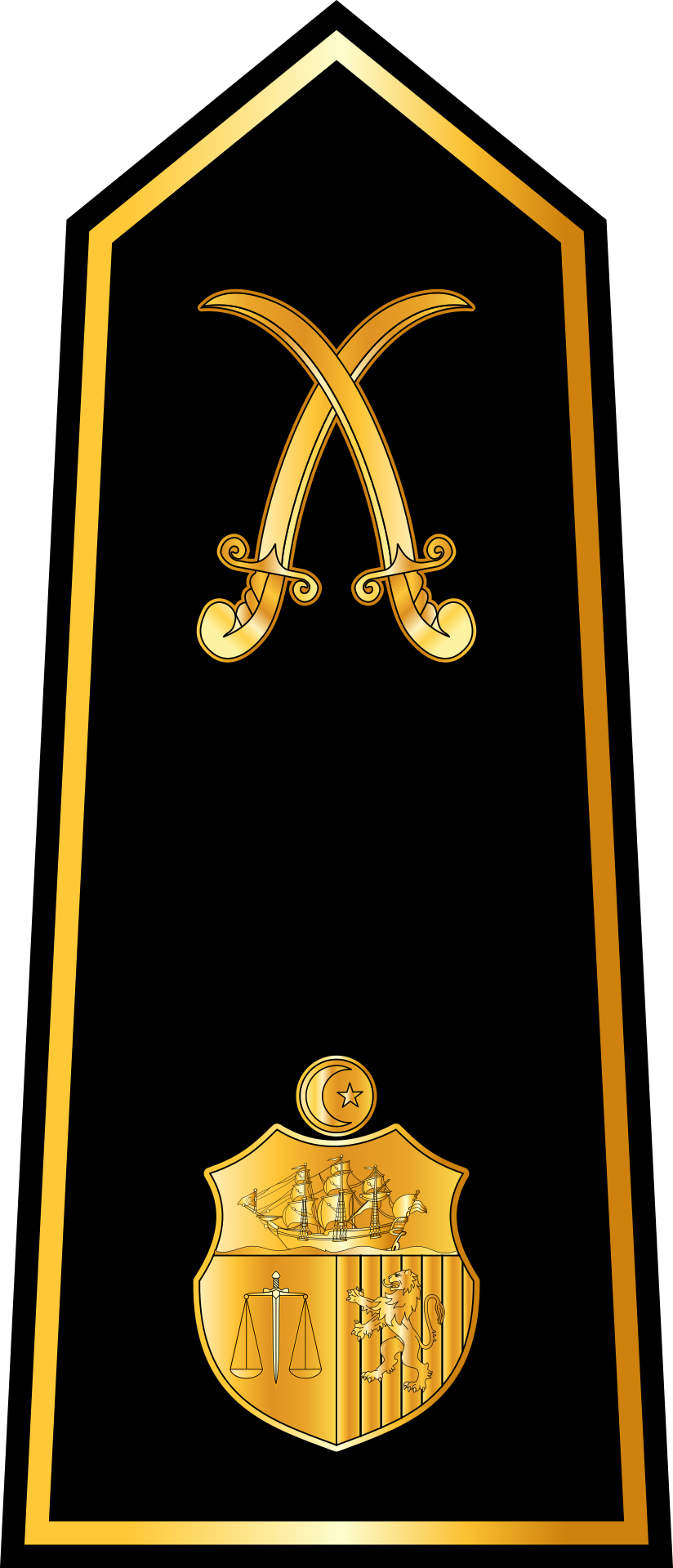
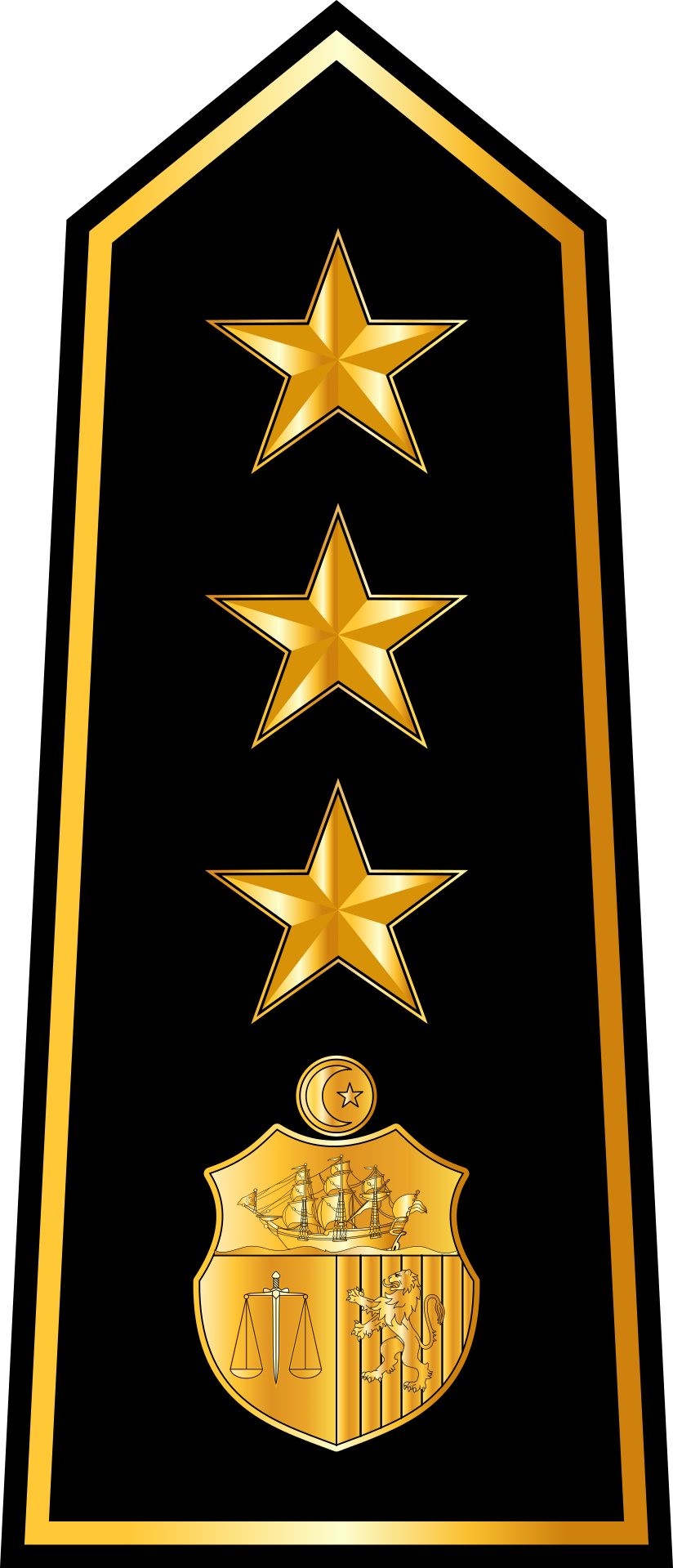
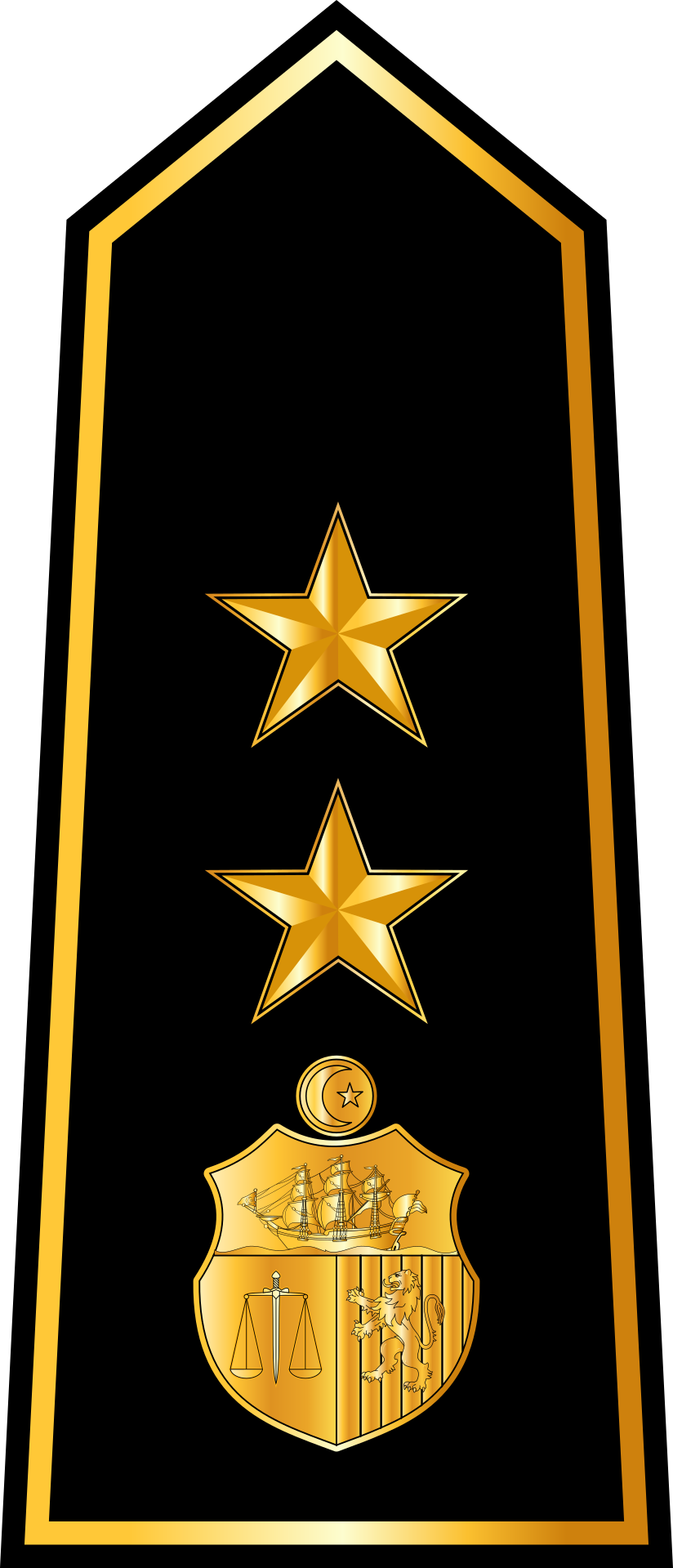
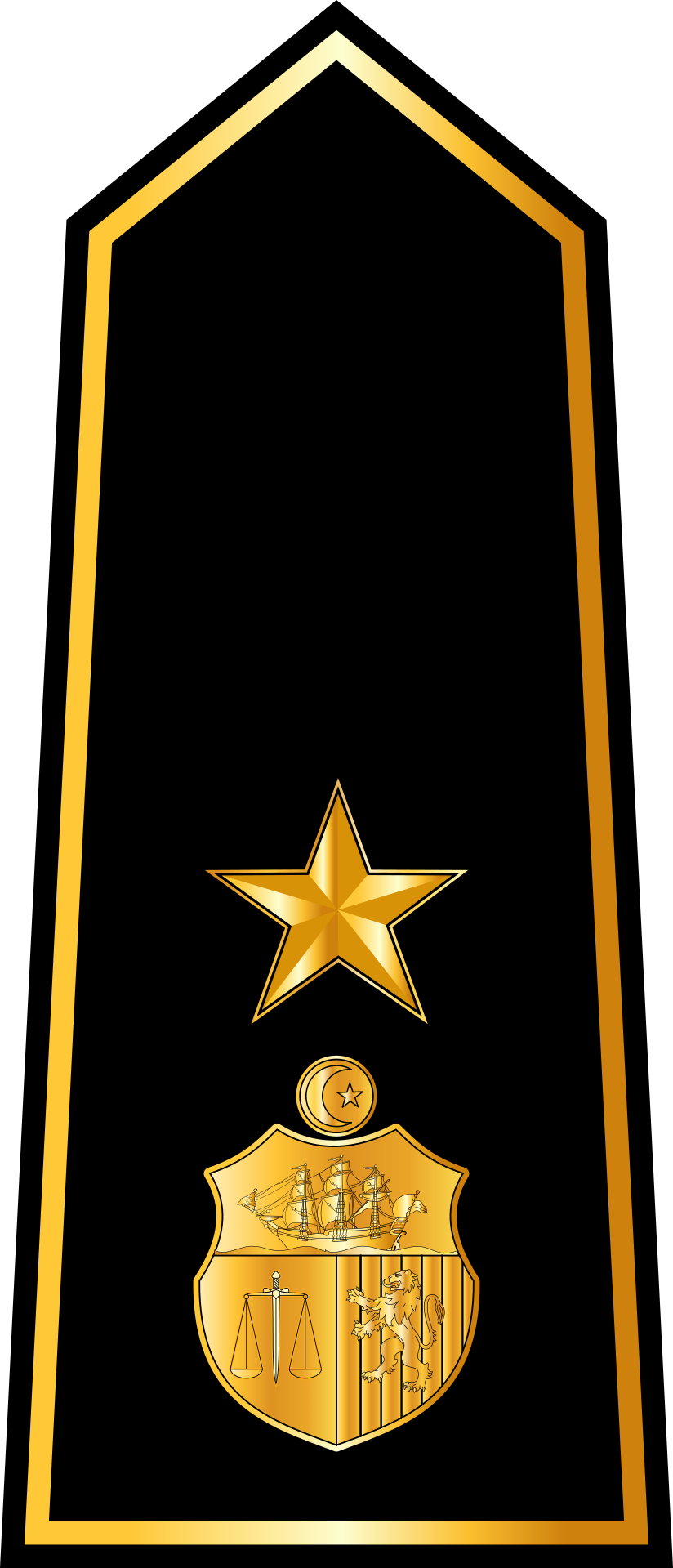
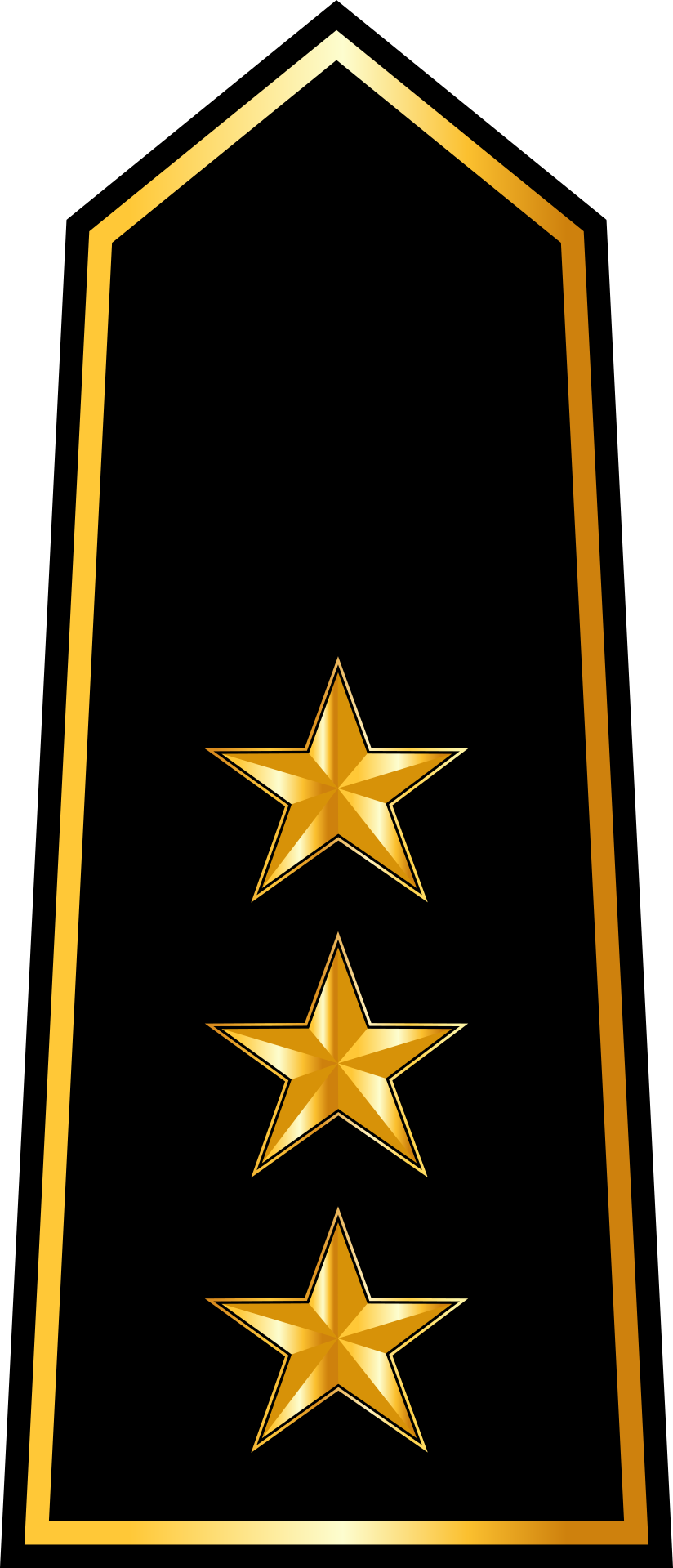
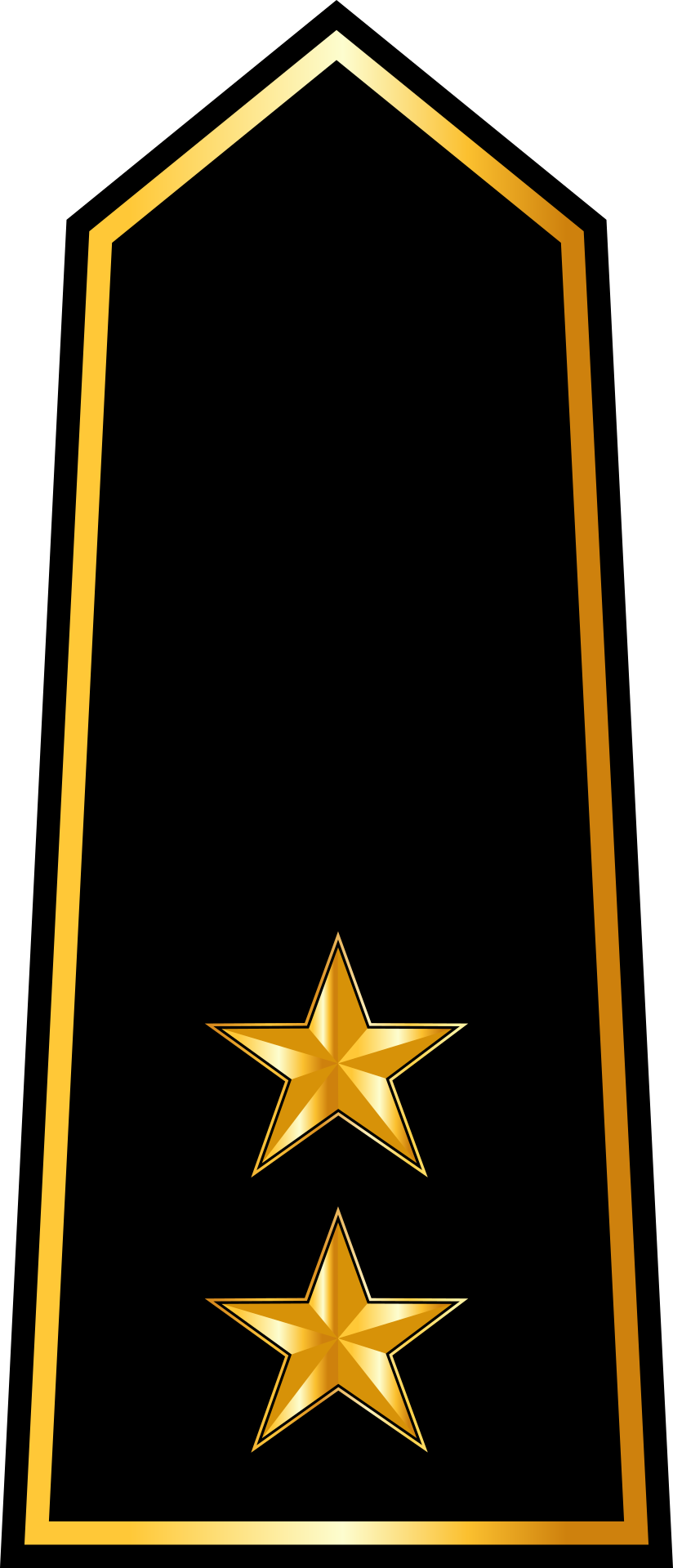
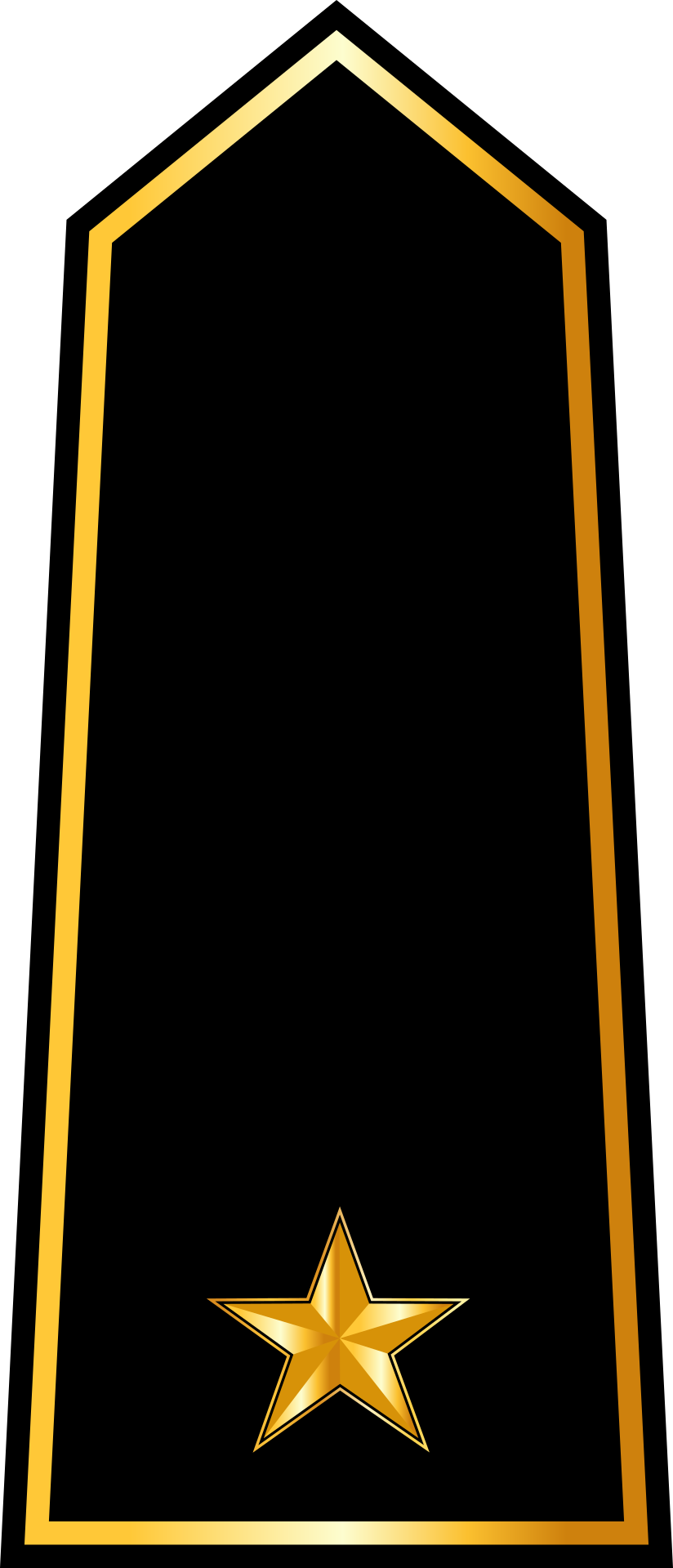
Rank group	General / flag officers			Senior officers				Junior officers
Tunisian Army
Tunisian Army	فريق أول; Fariq 'awal	فريق; Fariq	أمير لواء 'amir liwa'	عميد; Amid	عقيد; Aqid	مقدم; Muqaddam	رائد; Ra'id	نقيب; Naqib	ملازم أول; Mulazim awwal	ملازم; Mulazim
Tunisian Army	Général de corps d'armée	Général de division	Général de brigade	Colonel-major	Colonel	Lieutenant-colonel	Commandant	Capitaine	Lieutenant	Sous-lieutenant
Tunisian National Navy
Tunisian National Navy	فريق أول بالبحرية; Fariq 'awal bialbahria	فريق بالبحرية; Fariq bialbahria	أمير لواء بالبحرية 'amir liwa' bialbahria	عميد بالبحرية; Amid bialbahria	عقيد بالبحرية; Aqid bialbahria	مقدم بالبحرية; Muqaddam bialbahria	رائد بالبحرية; Ra'id bialbahria	نقيب بالبحرية; Naqib bialbahria	ملازم أول بالبحرية; Mulazim 'awal bialbahria	ملازم بالبحرية; Mulazim bialbahria
Tunisian National Navy	Amiral	Vice-amiral	Contre-amiral	Capitaine de vaisseau major	Capitaine de vaisseau	Capitaine de frégate	Capitaine de corvette	Lieutenant de vaisseau	Enseigne de vaisseau de 1^{re} classe	Enseigne de vaisseau de 2^{e} classe
Tunisian Air Force
Tunisian Air Force	فريق أول; Fariq 'awal	فريق; Fariq	أمير لواء 'amir liwa'	عميد; Amid	عقيد; Aqid	مقدم; Muqaddam	رائد; Ra'id	نقيب; Naqib	ملازم أول; Mulazim awwal	ملازم; Mulazim
Tunisian Air Force	Général de corps d'armée	Général de division	Général de brigade	Colonel-major	Colonel	Lieutenant-colonel	Commandant	Capitaine	Lieutenant	Sous-lieutenant
Tunisian National Guard
Tunisian National Guard			أمير لواء 'amir liwa'	عميد; Amid	عقيد; Aqid	مقدم; Muqaddam	رائد; Ra'id	نقيب; Naqib	ملازم أول; Mulazim awwal	ملازم; Mulazim
Tunisian National Guard			Général de brigade	Colonel-major	Colonel	Lieutenant-colonel	Commandant	Capitaine	Lieutenant	Sous-lieutenant
Rank group	General / flag officers			Senior officers				Junior officers

== Other ranks ==
The rank insignia of non-commissioned officers and enlisted personnel.

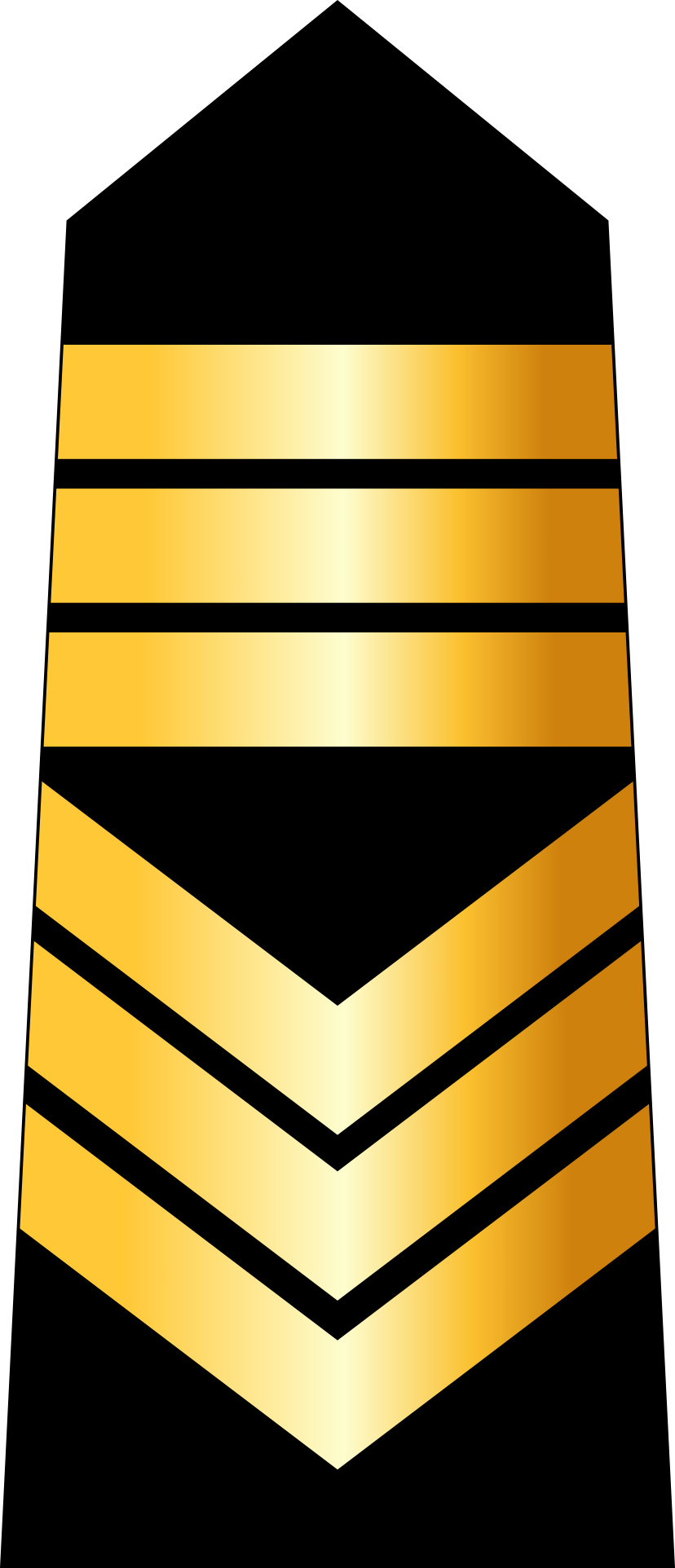
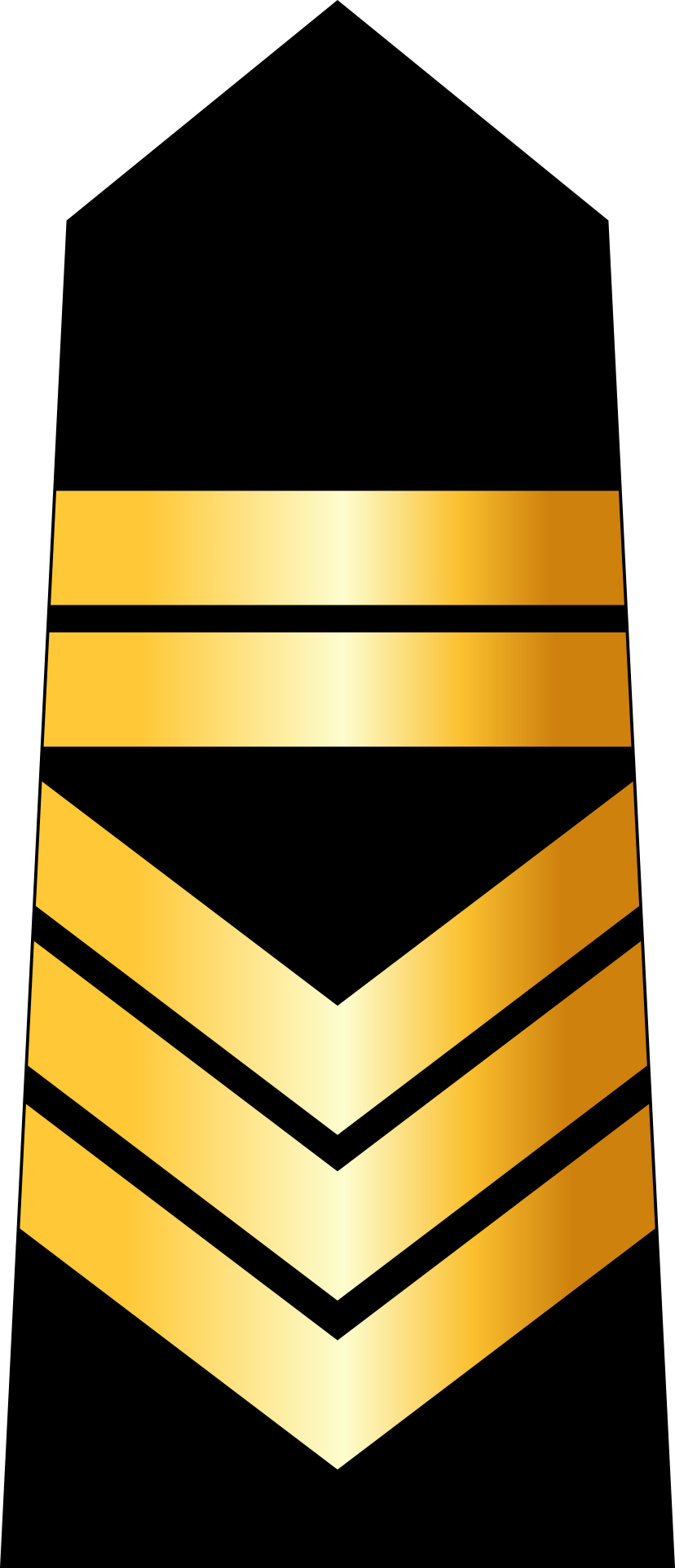
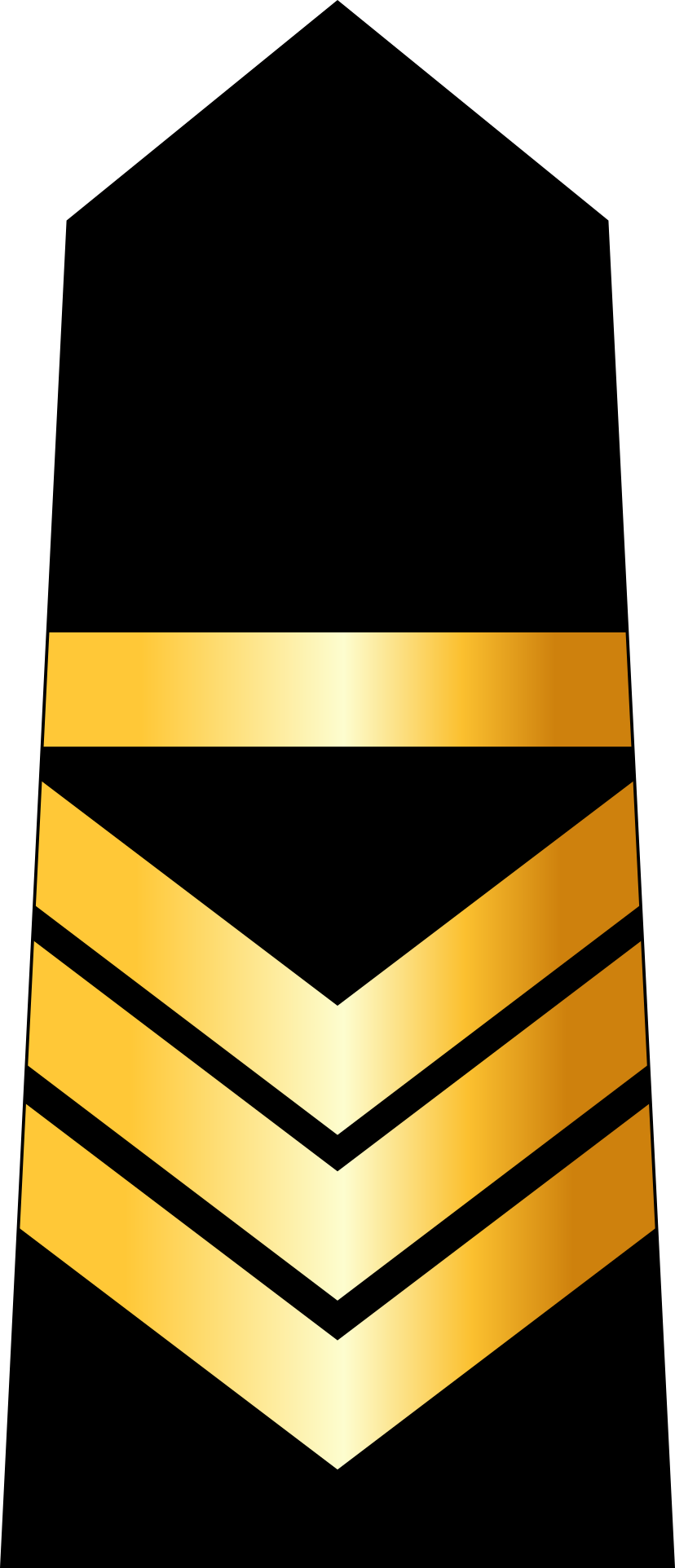
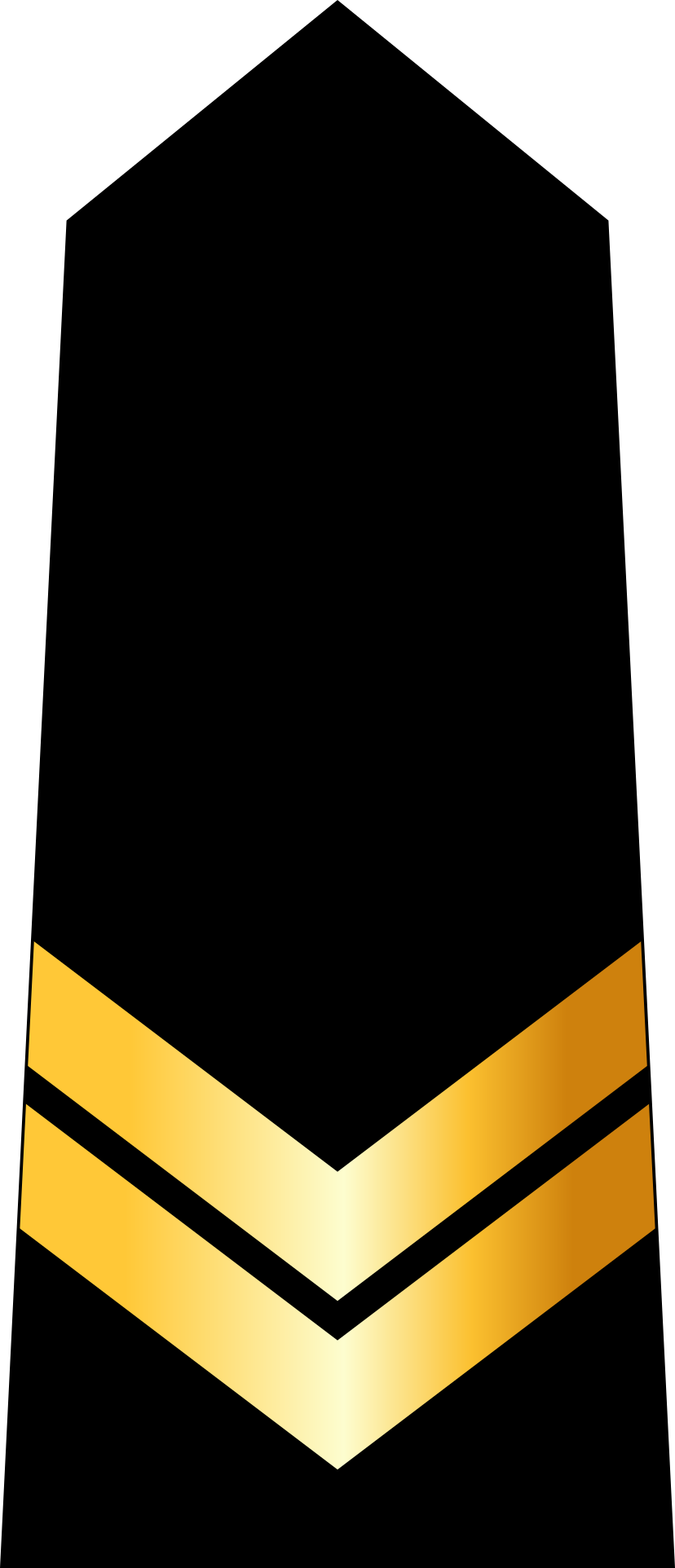
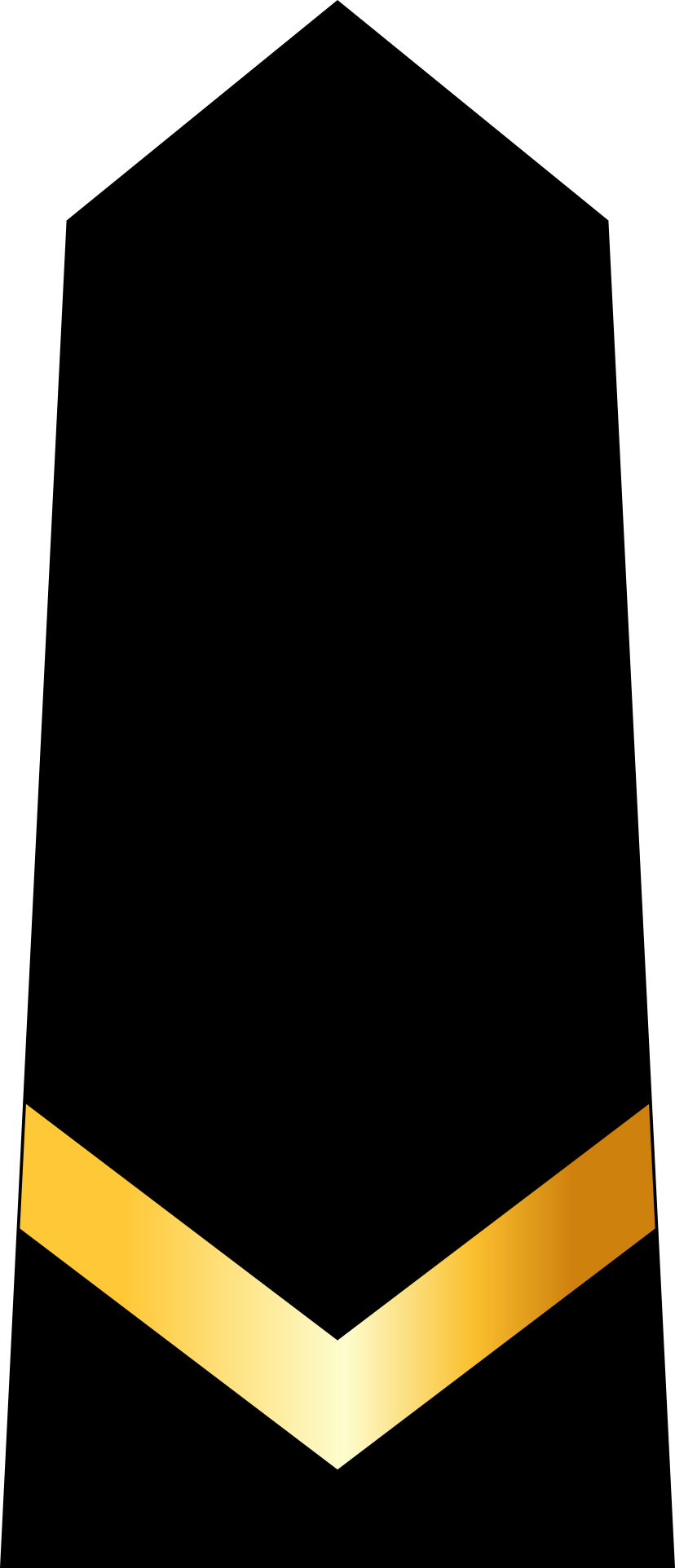
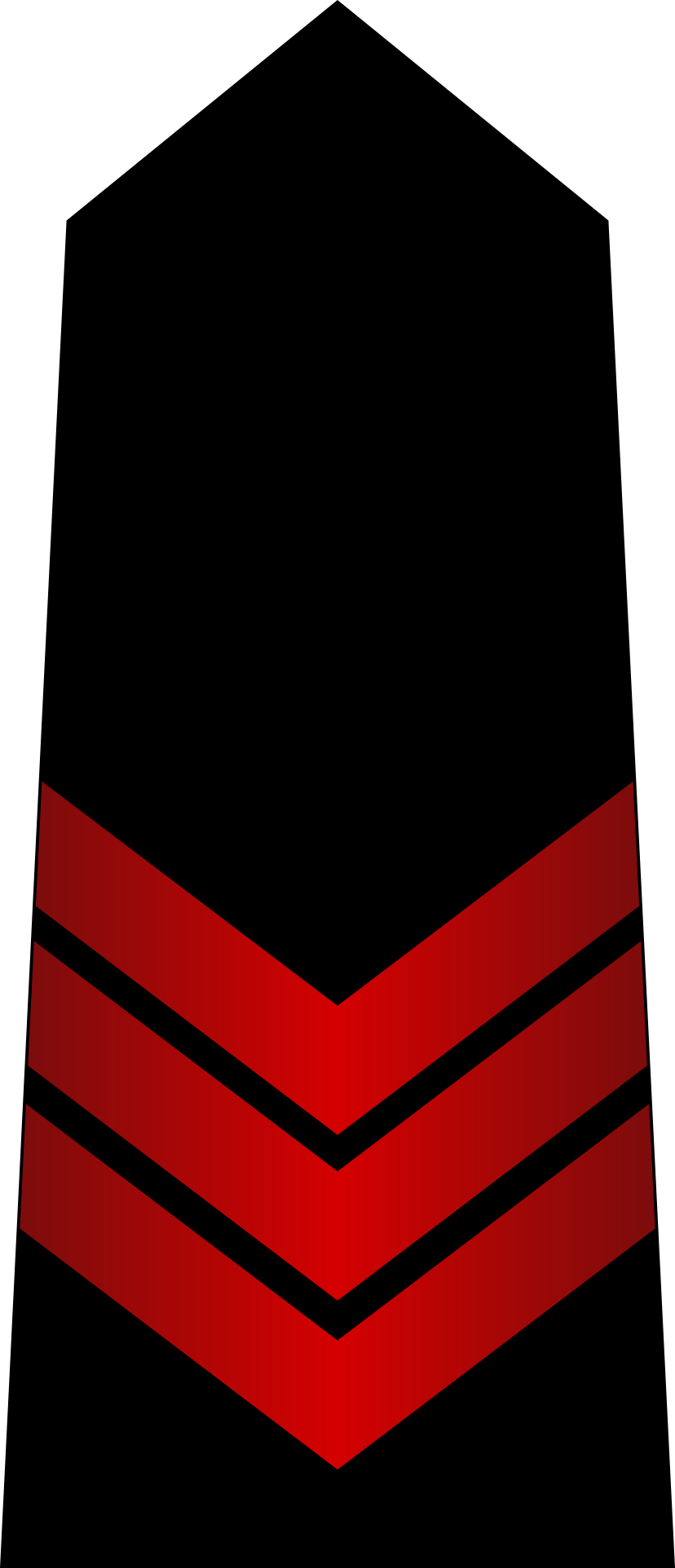
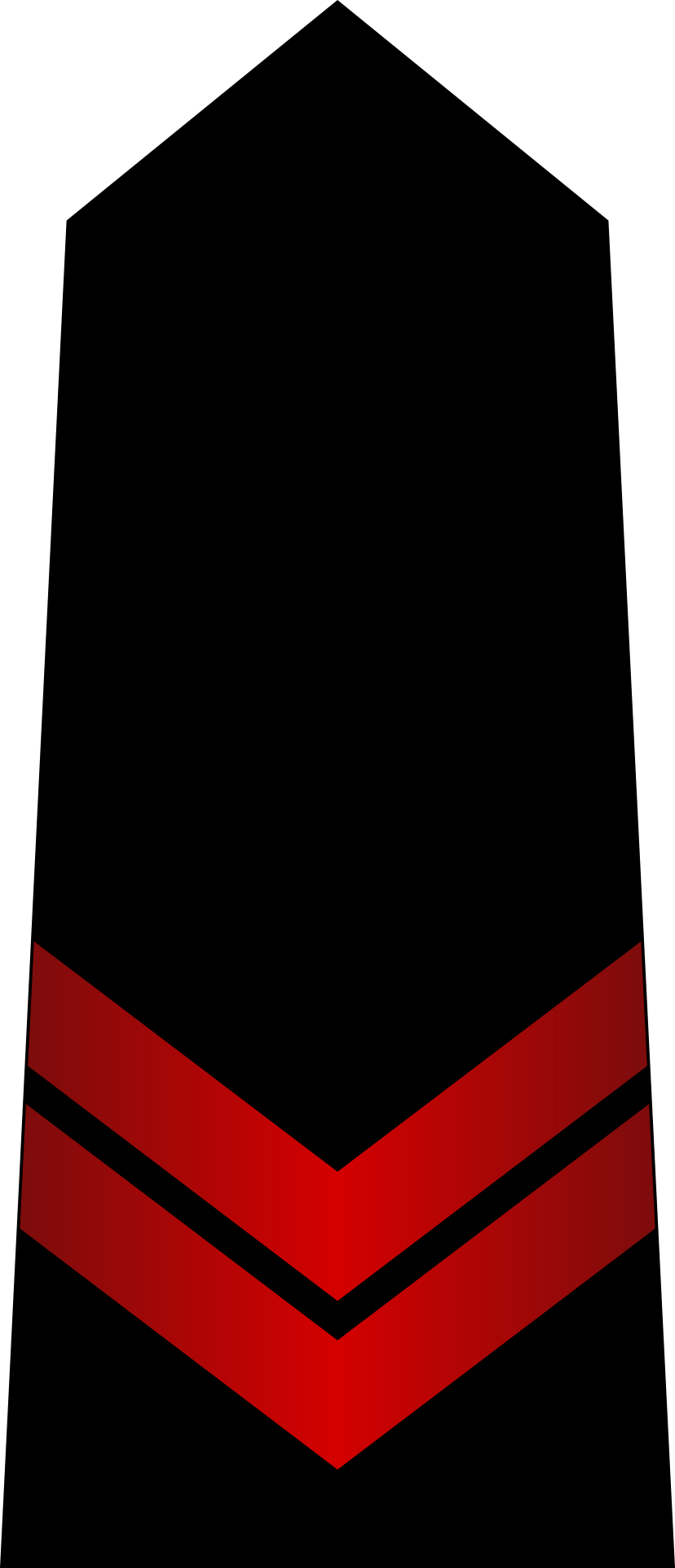
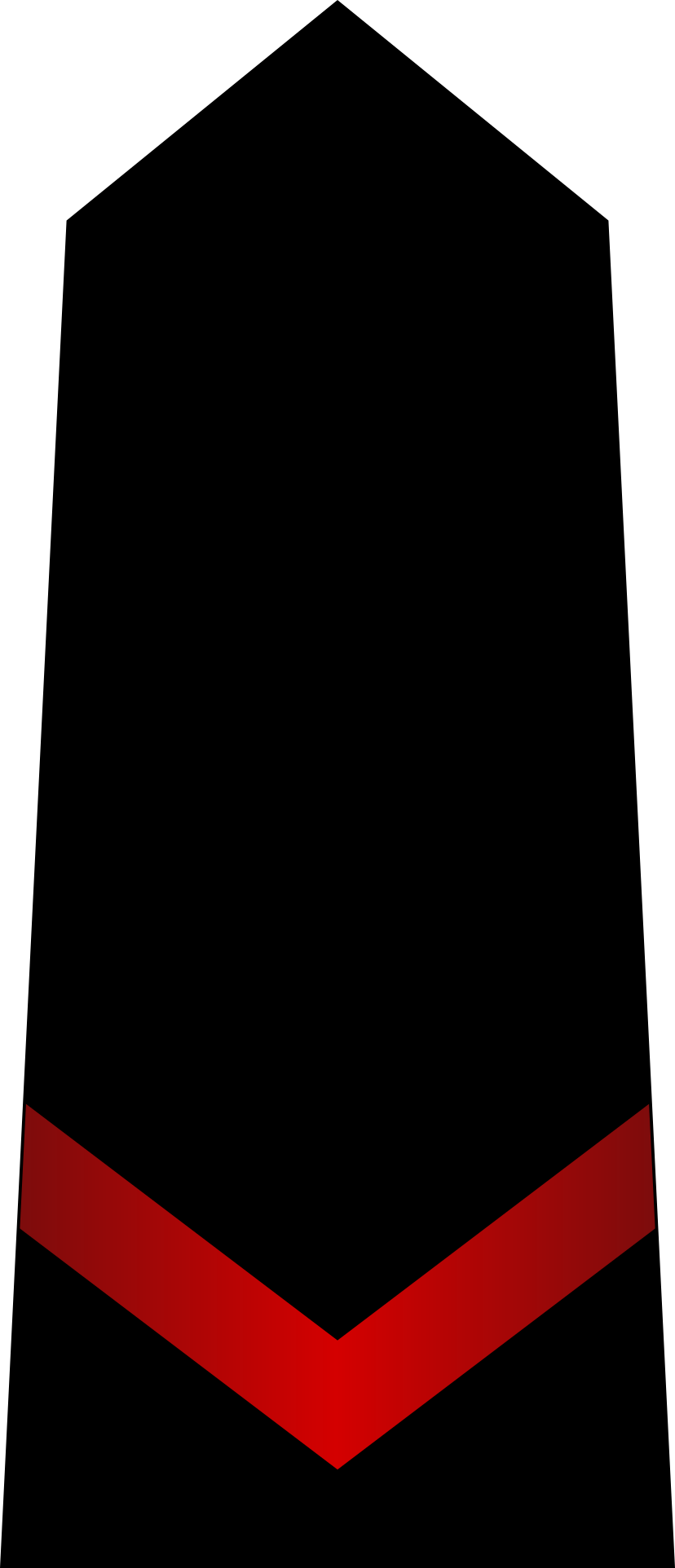
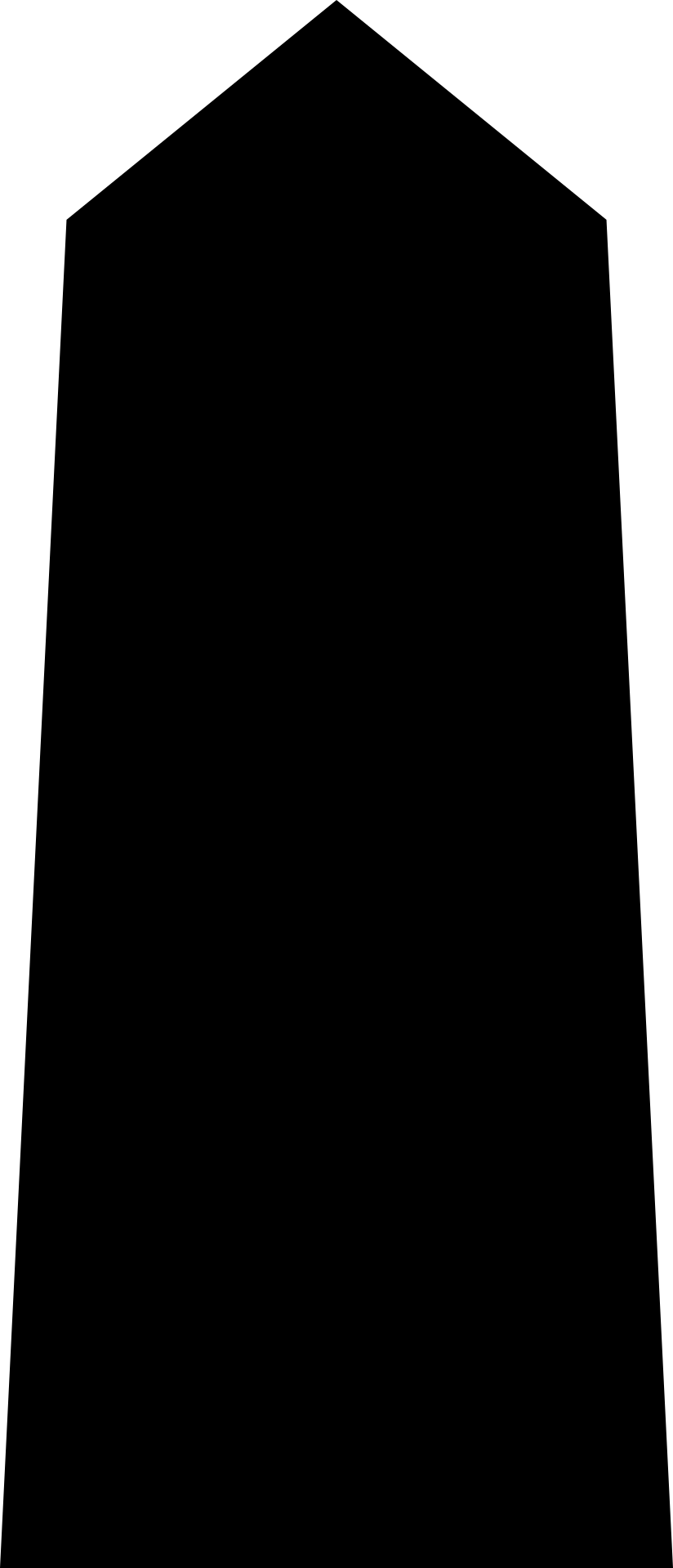
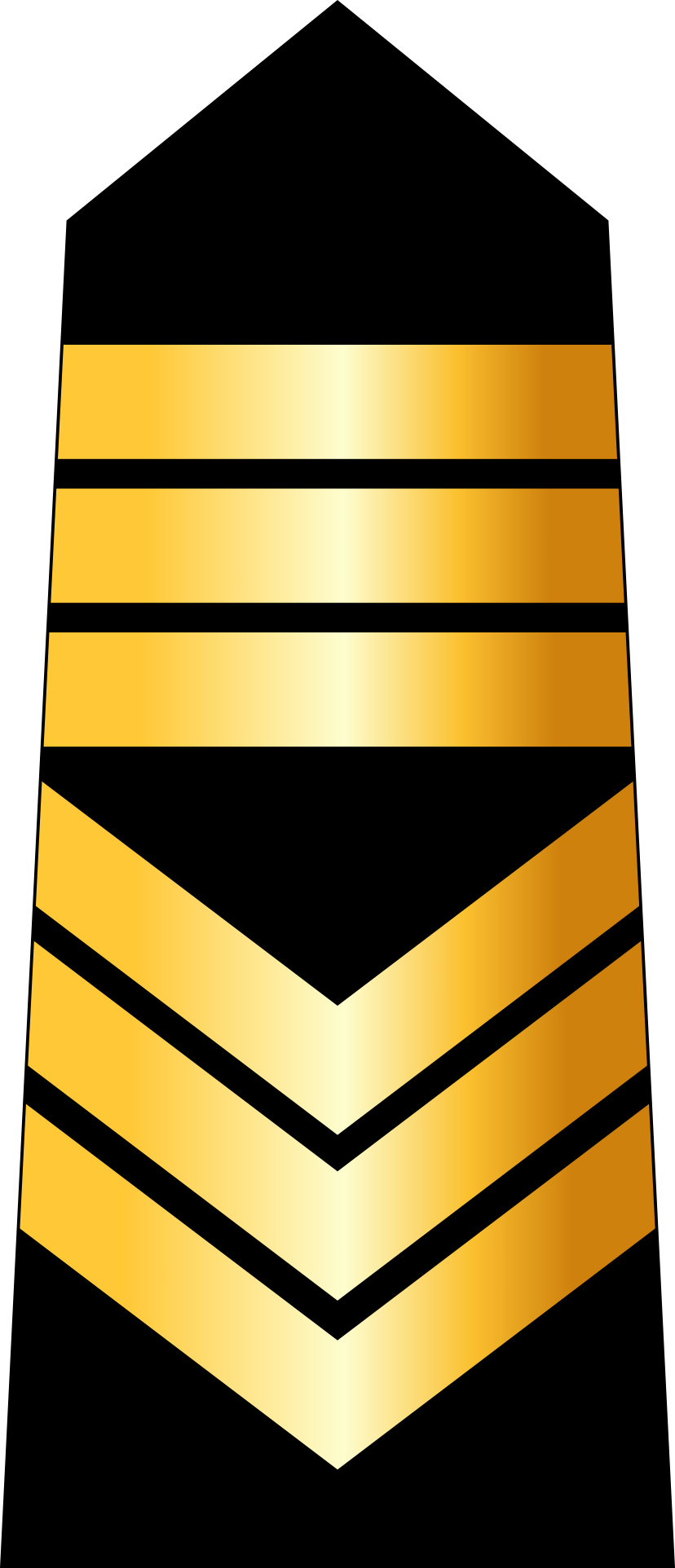
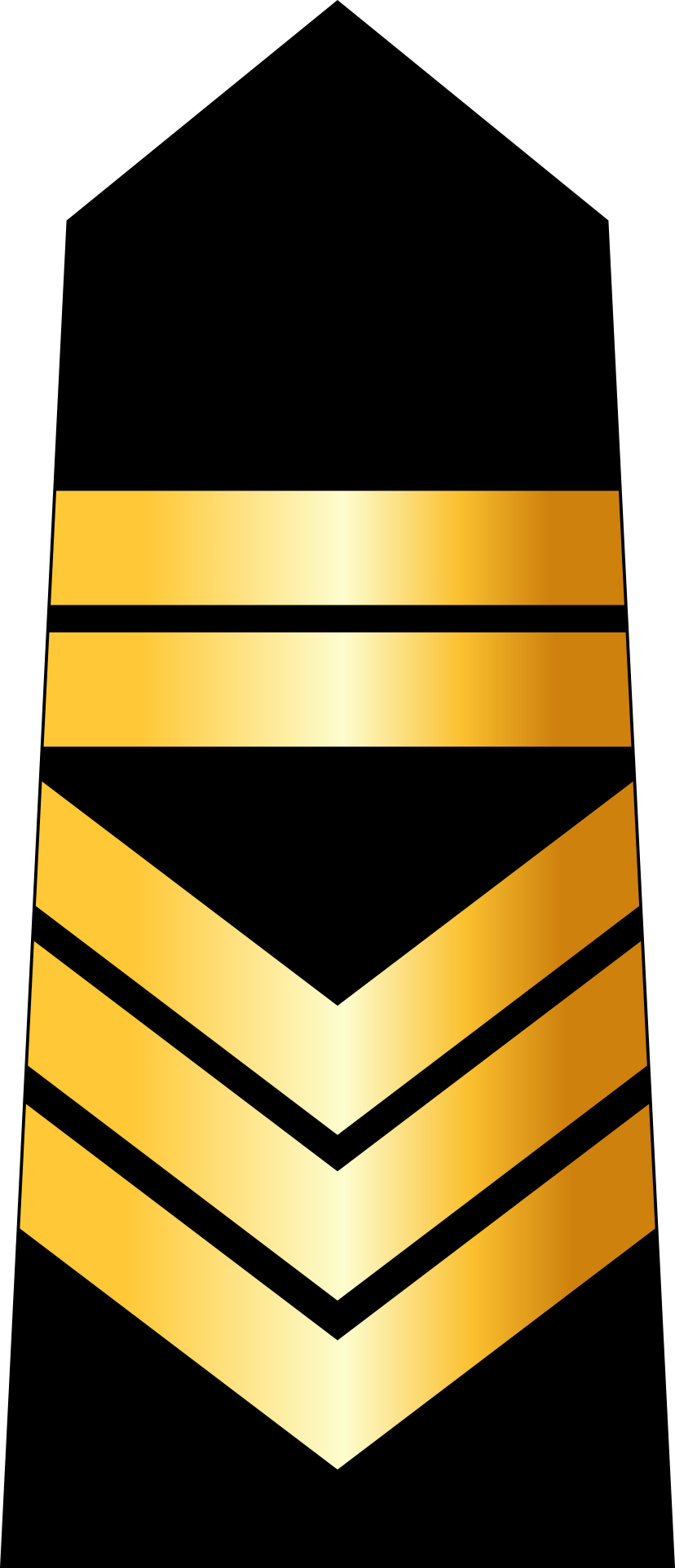
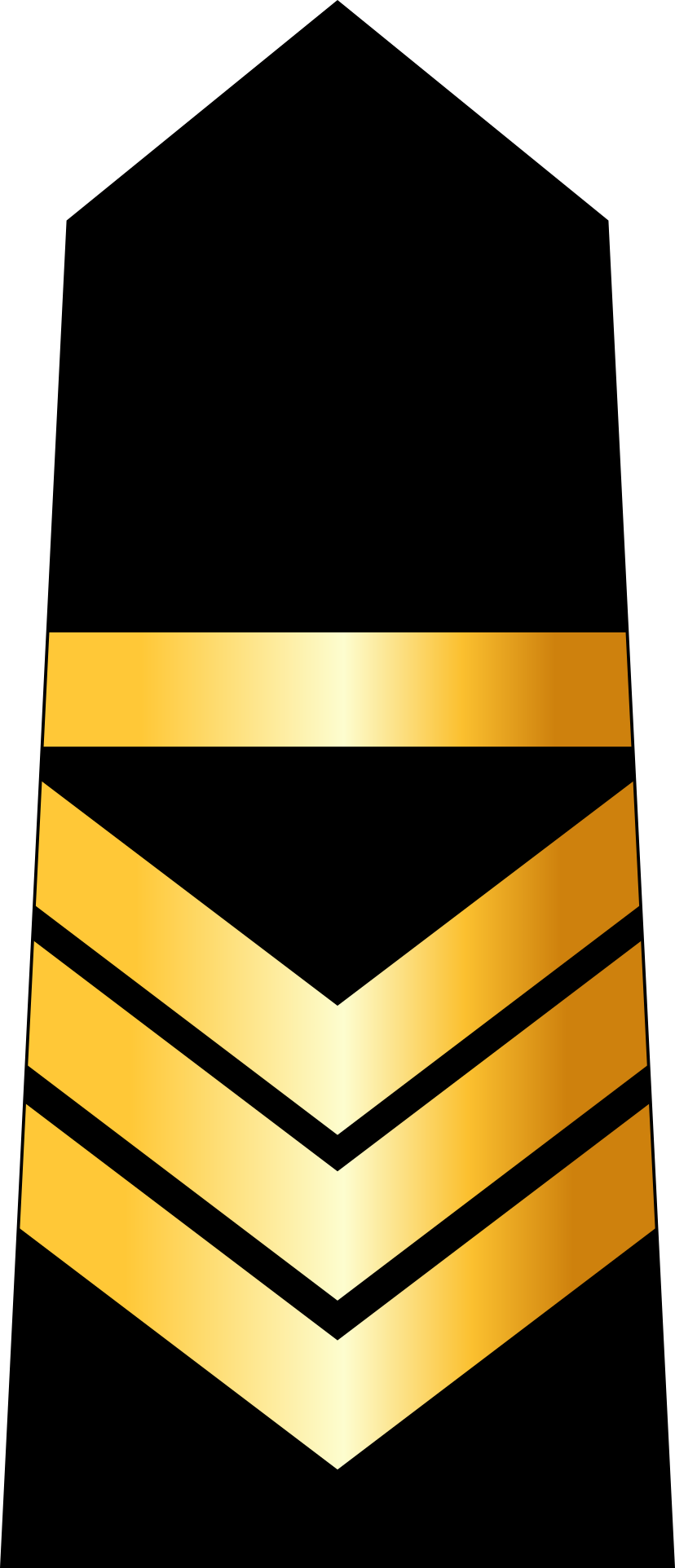
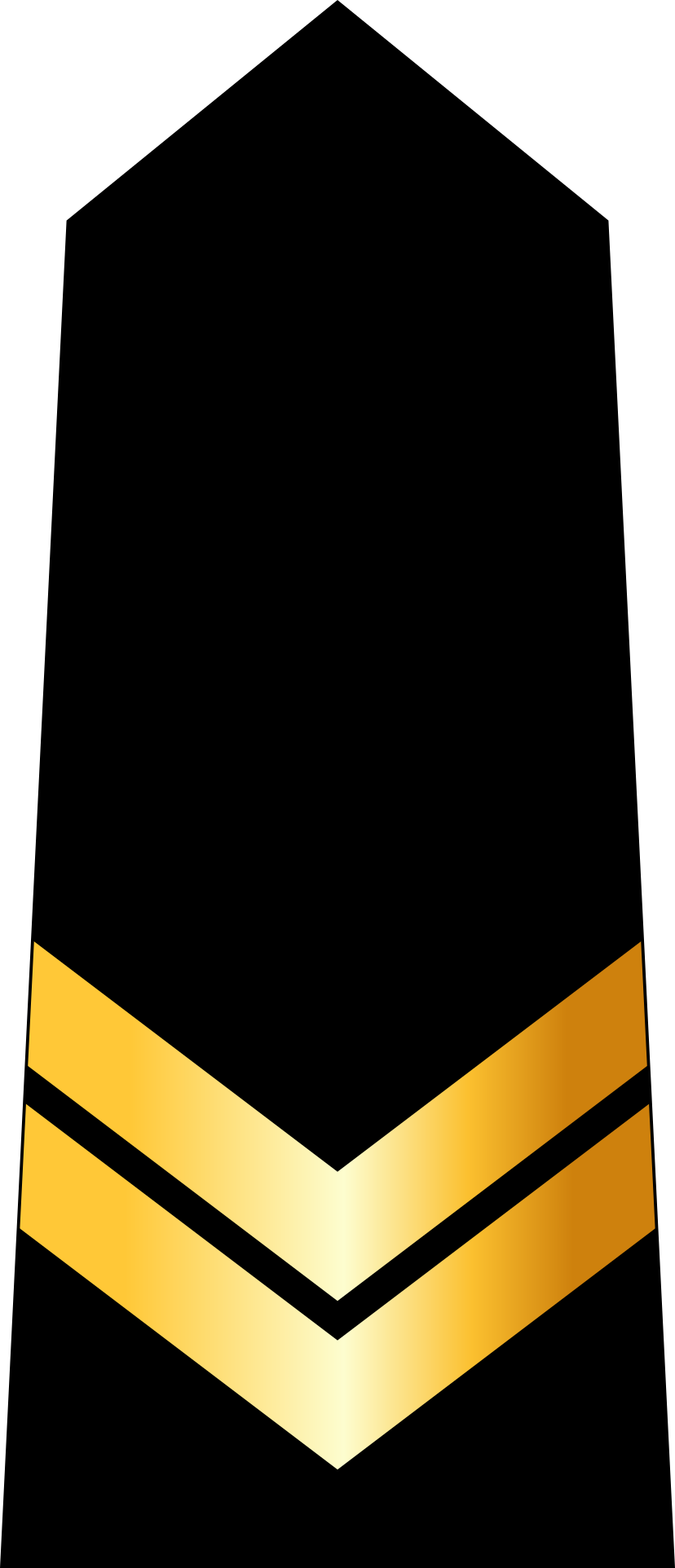
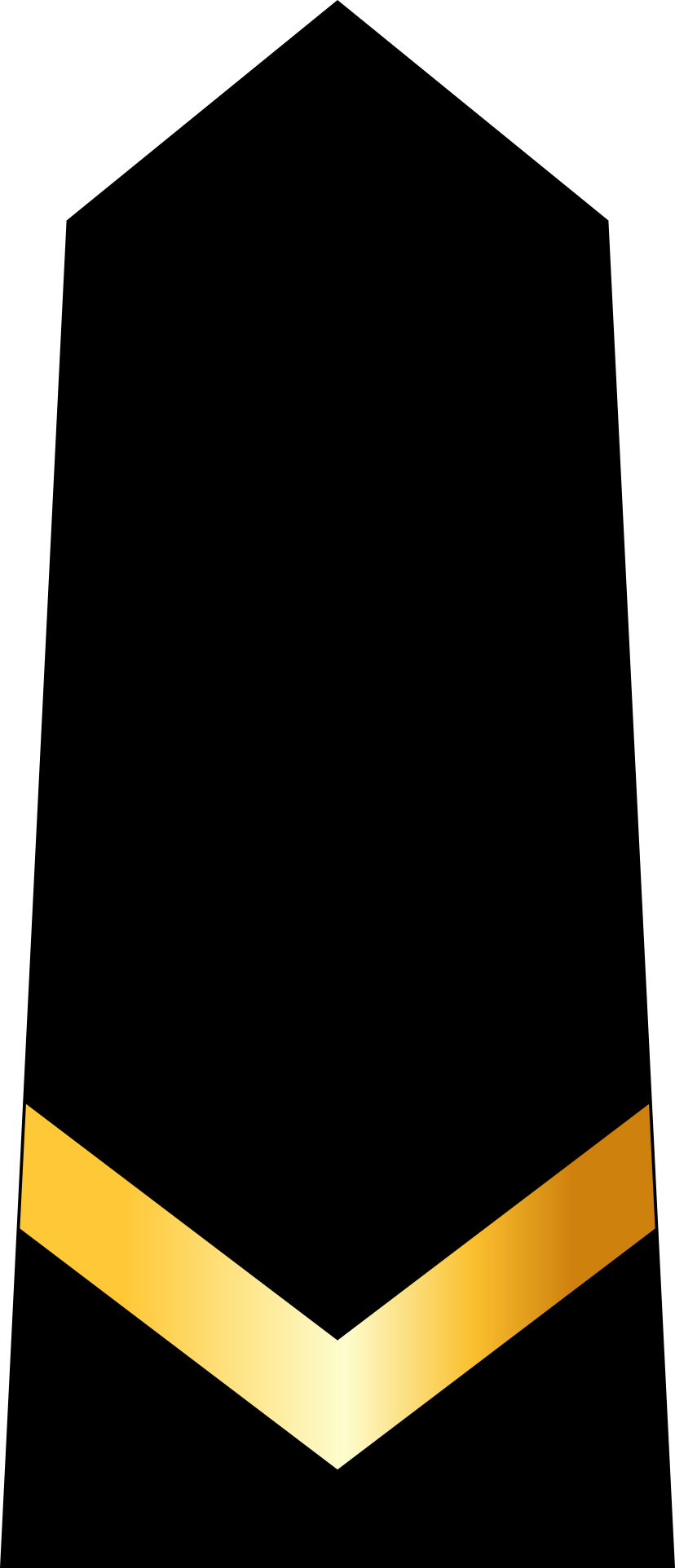
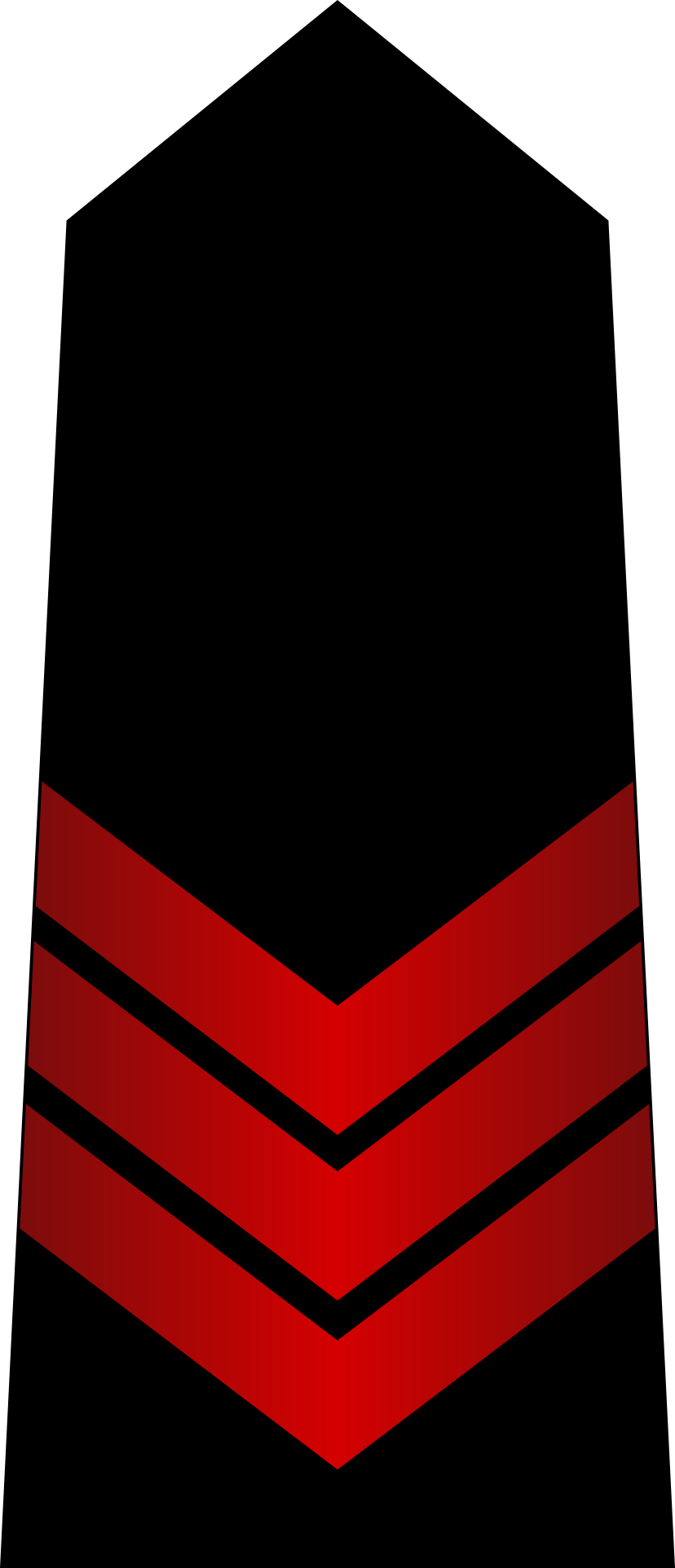
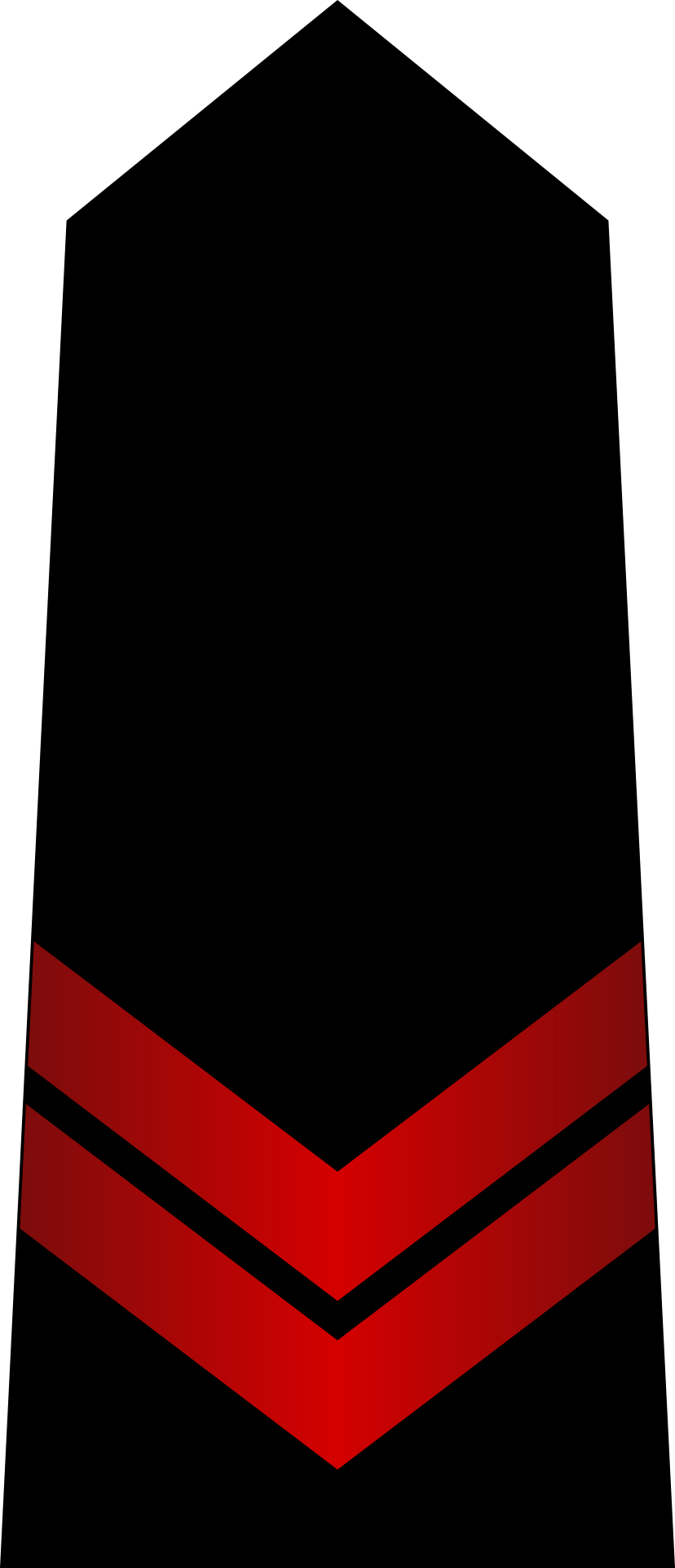
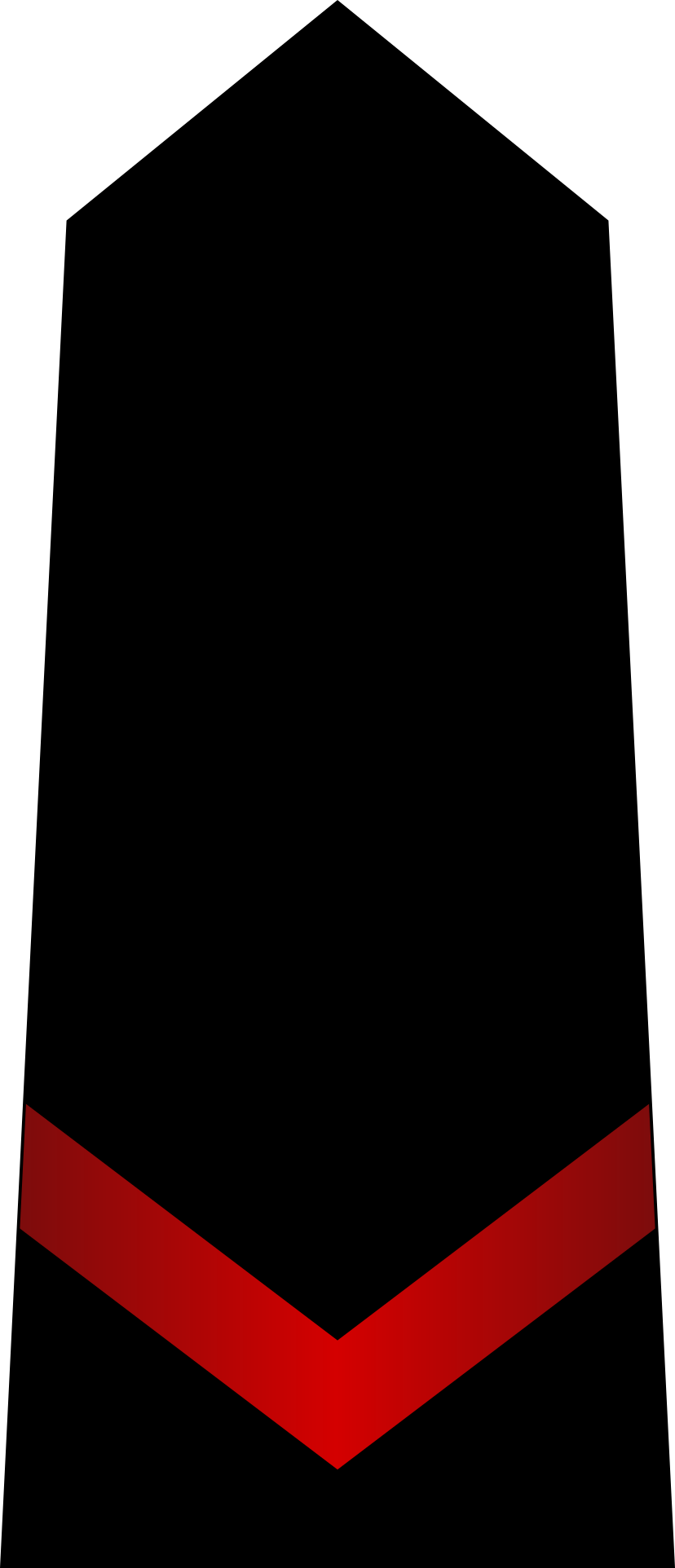
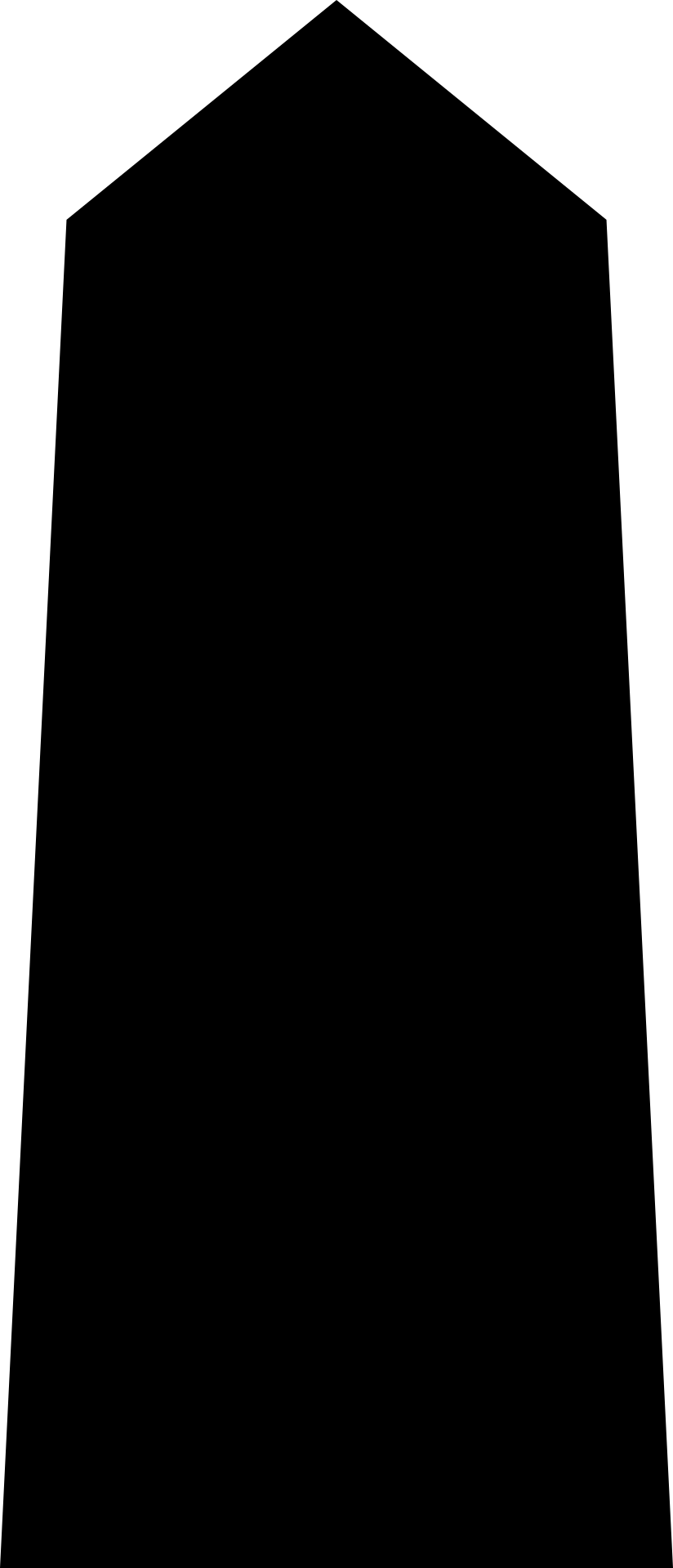
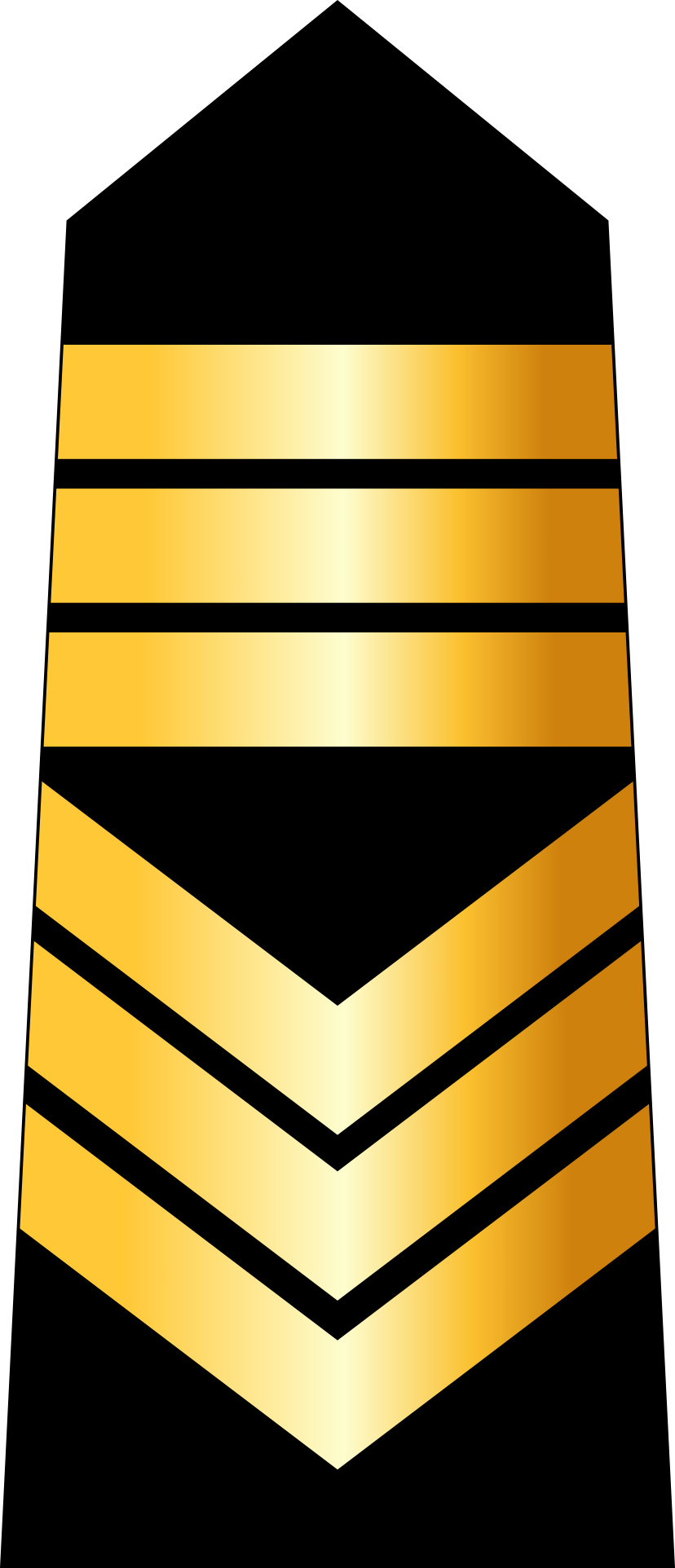
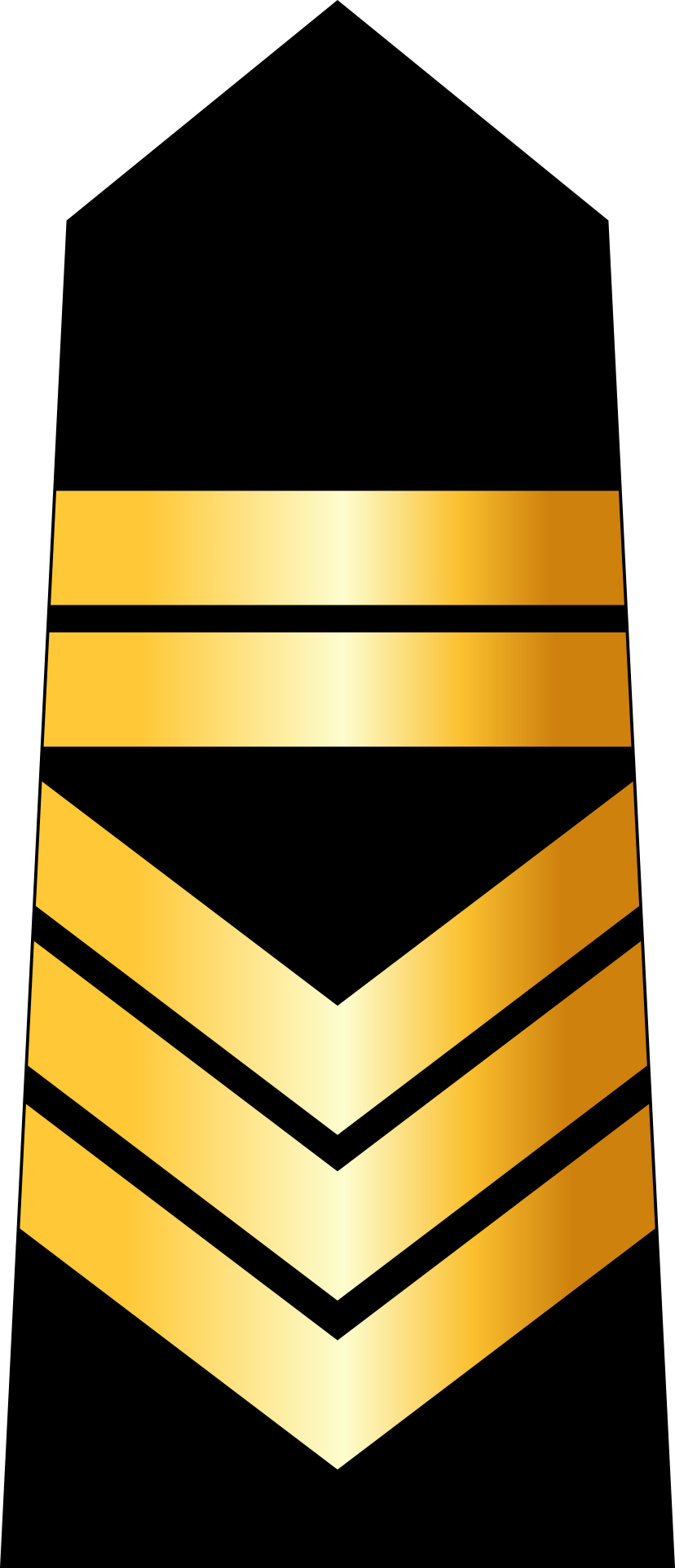
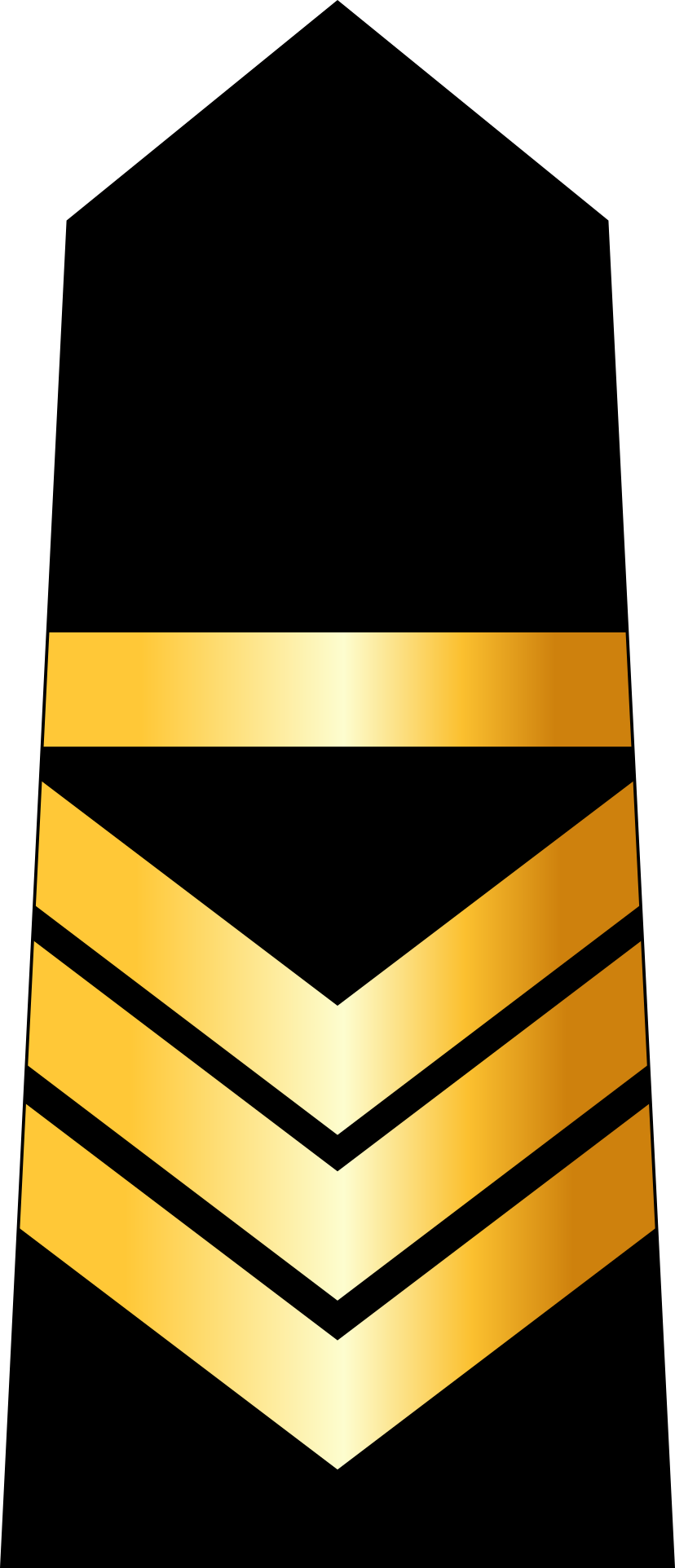
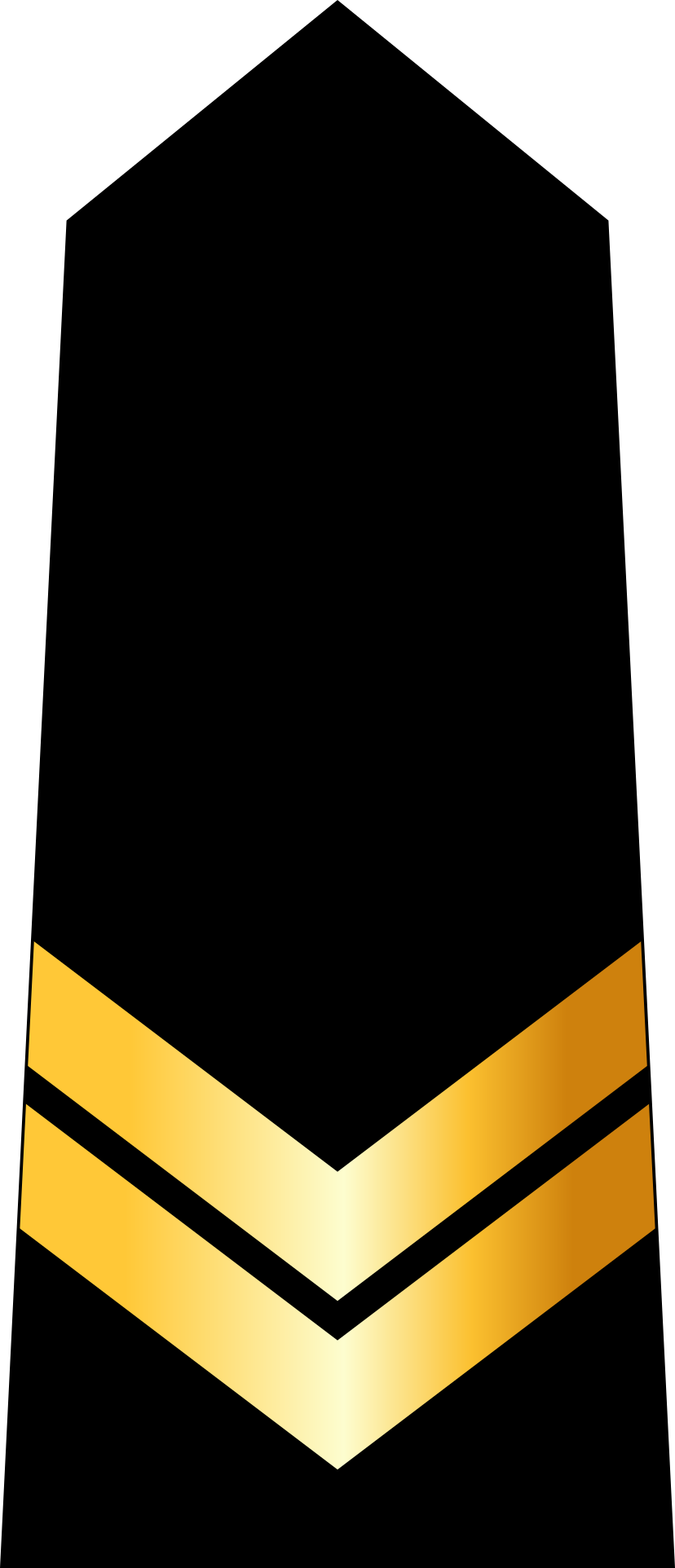
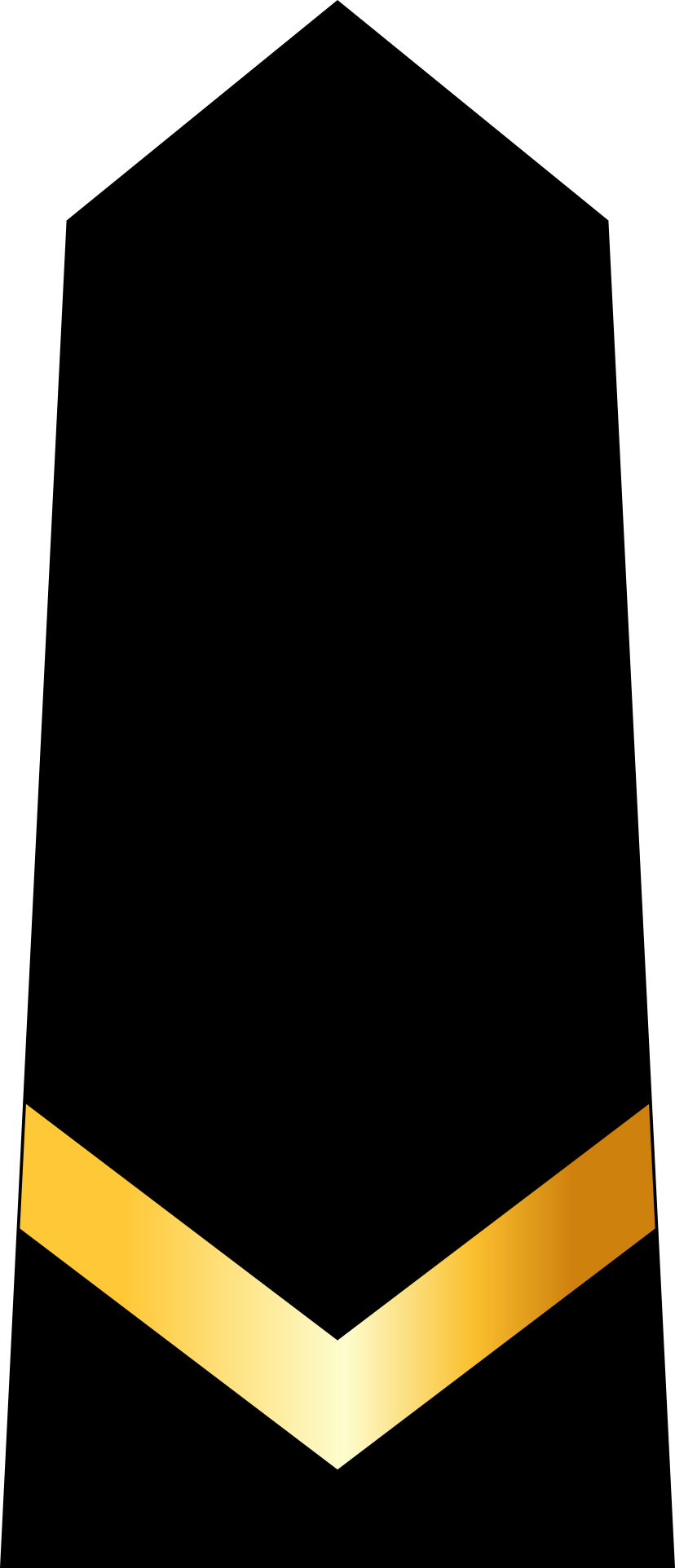
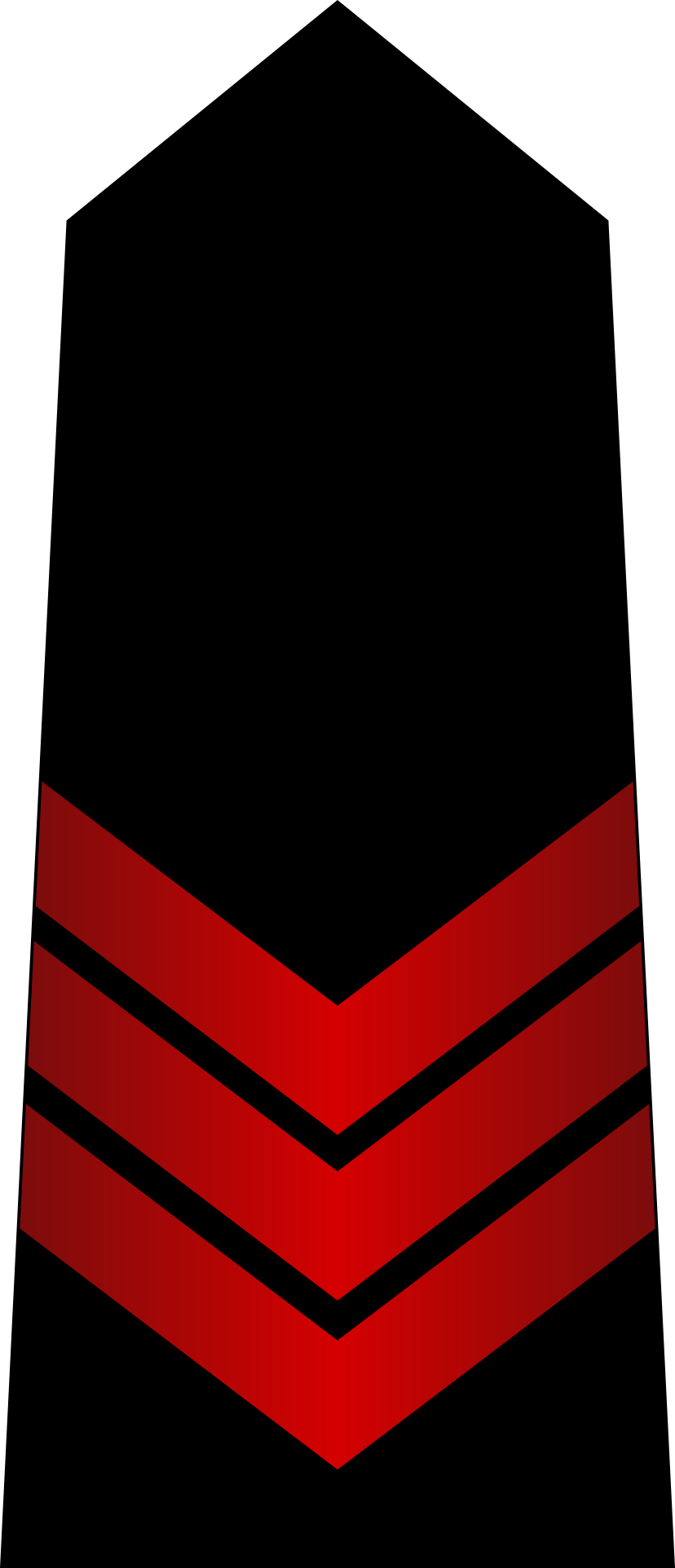
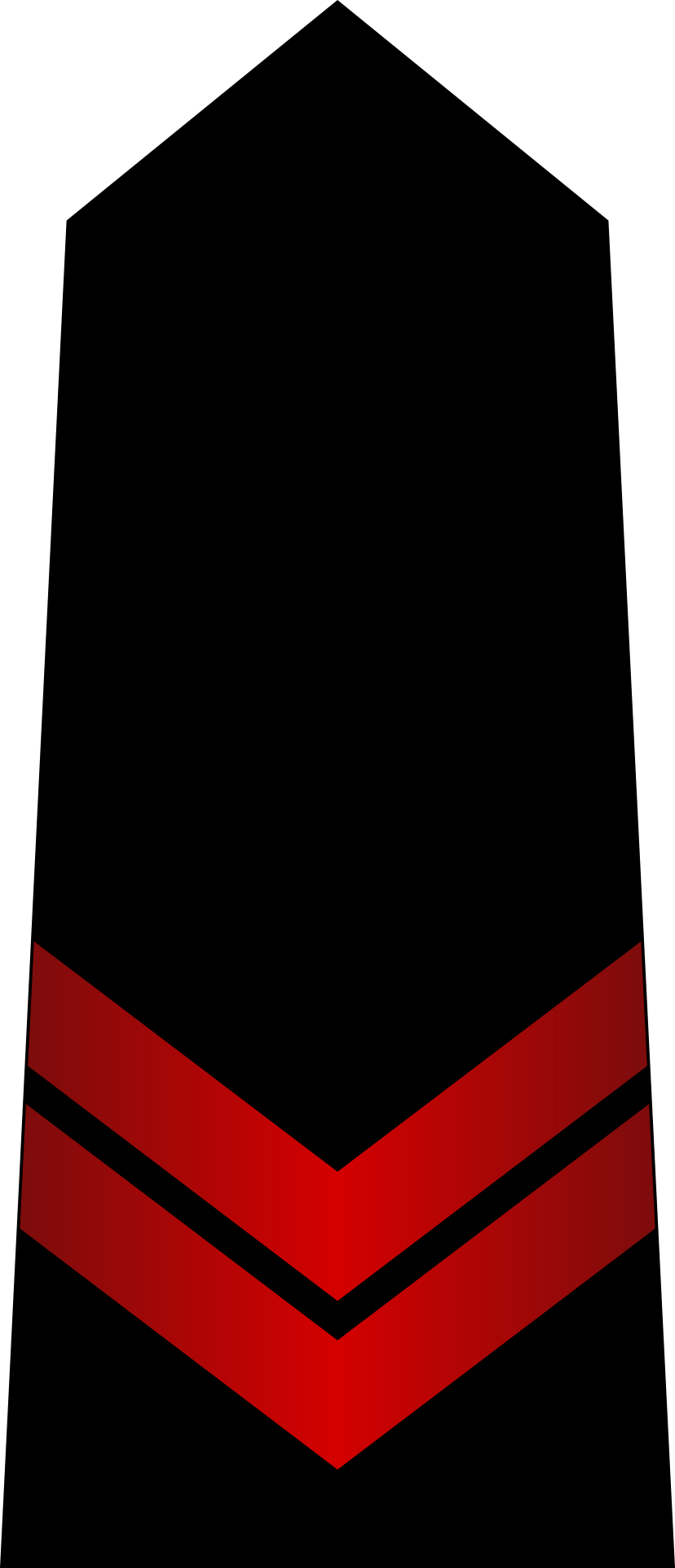
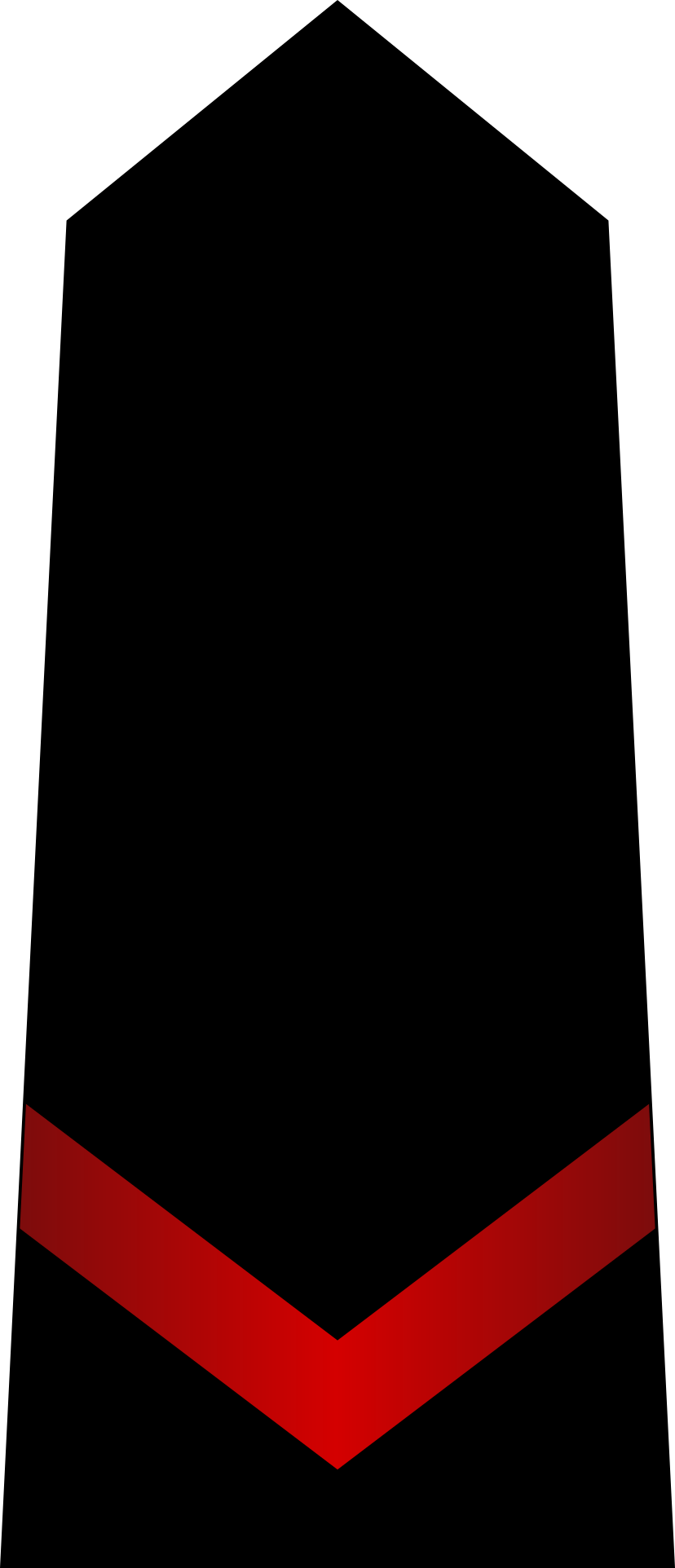
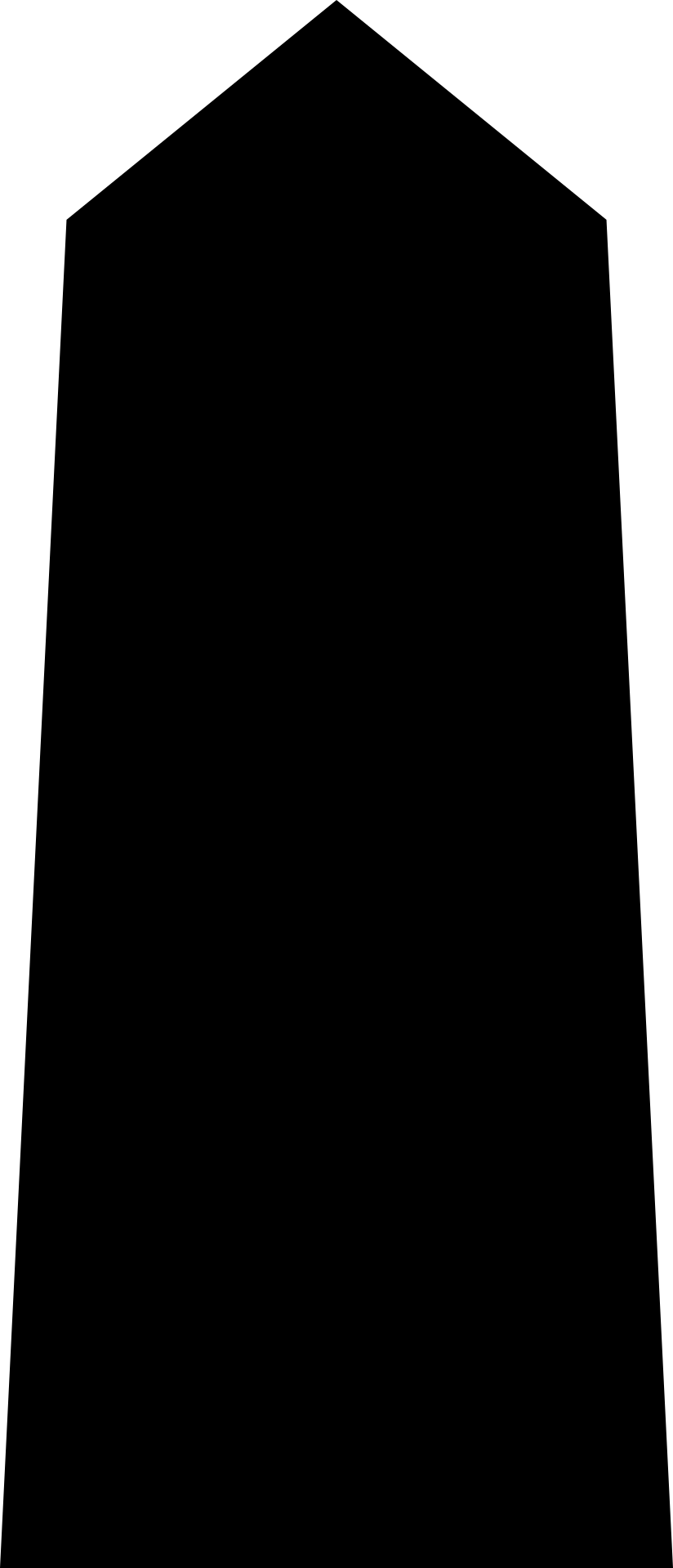
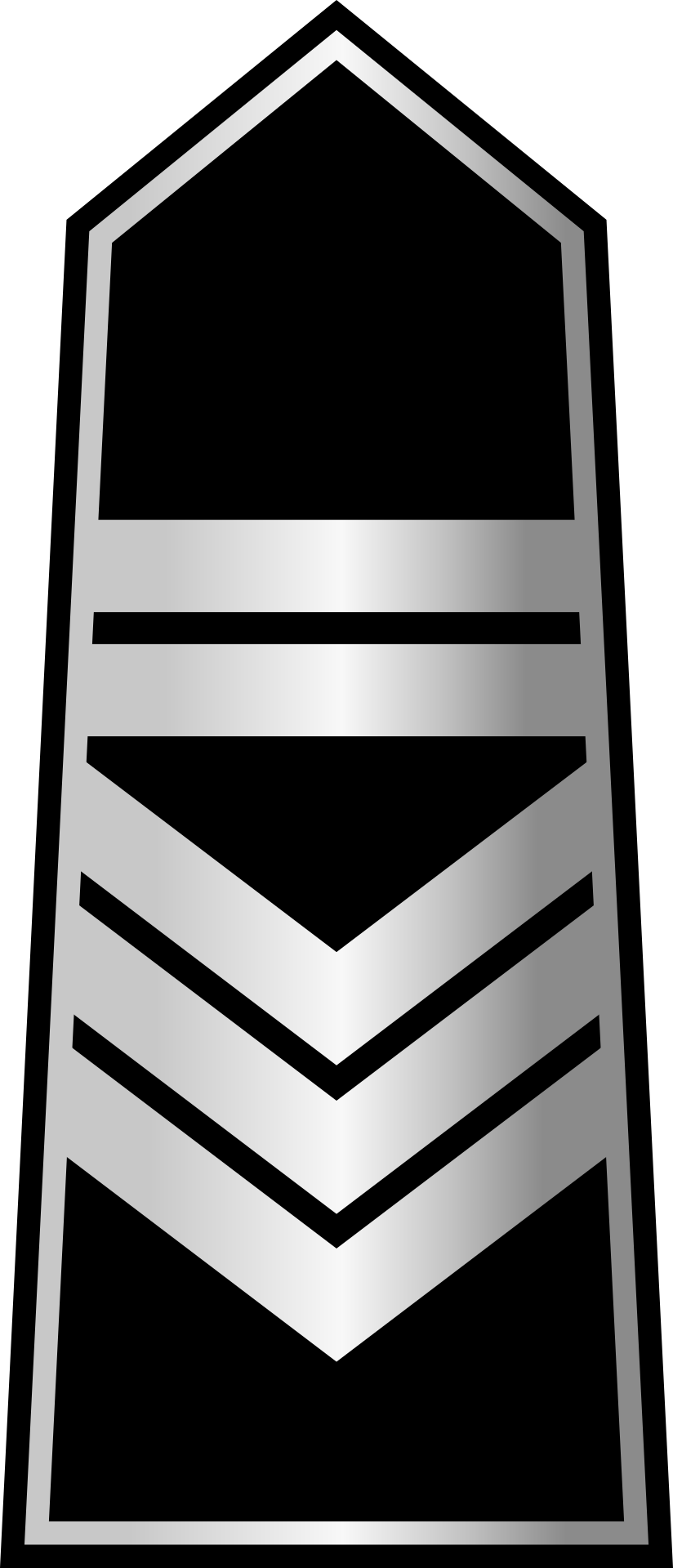
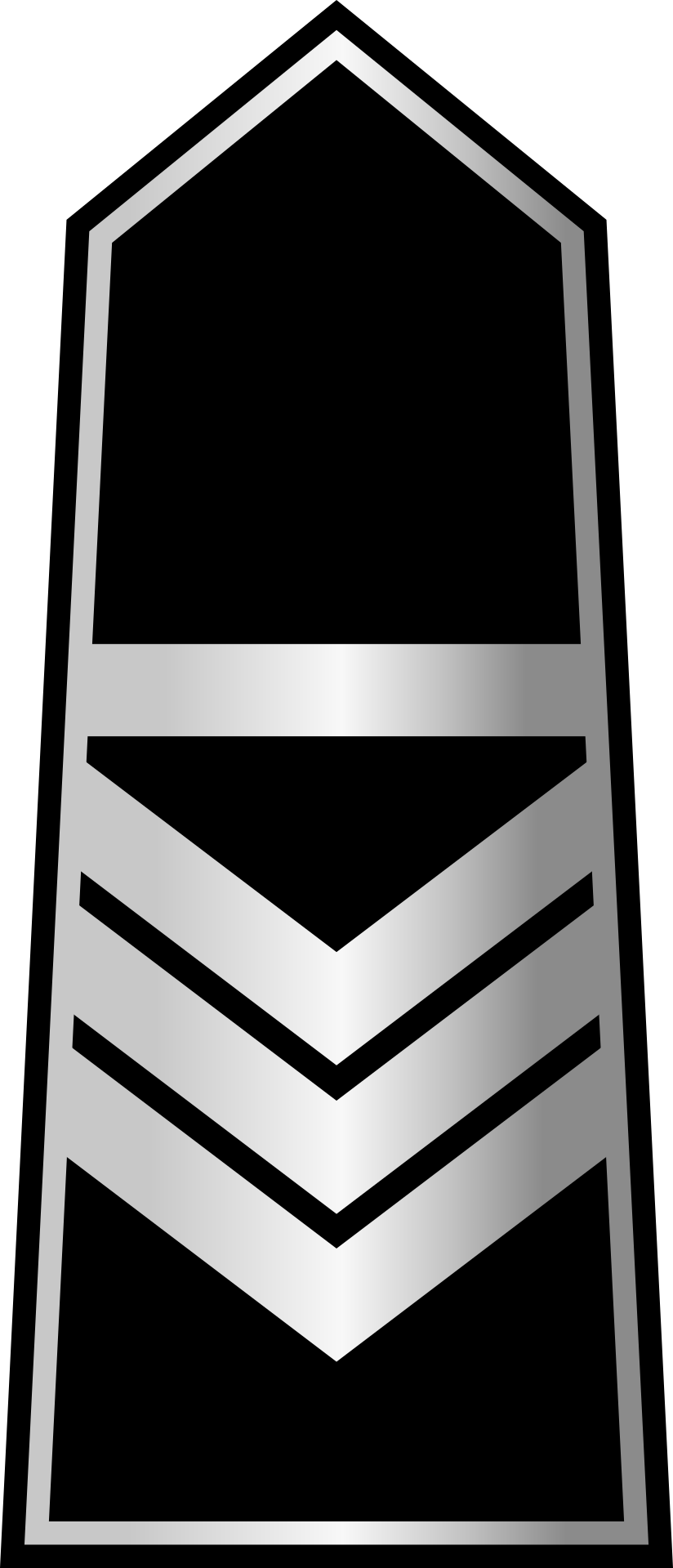
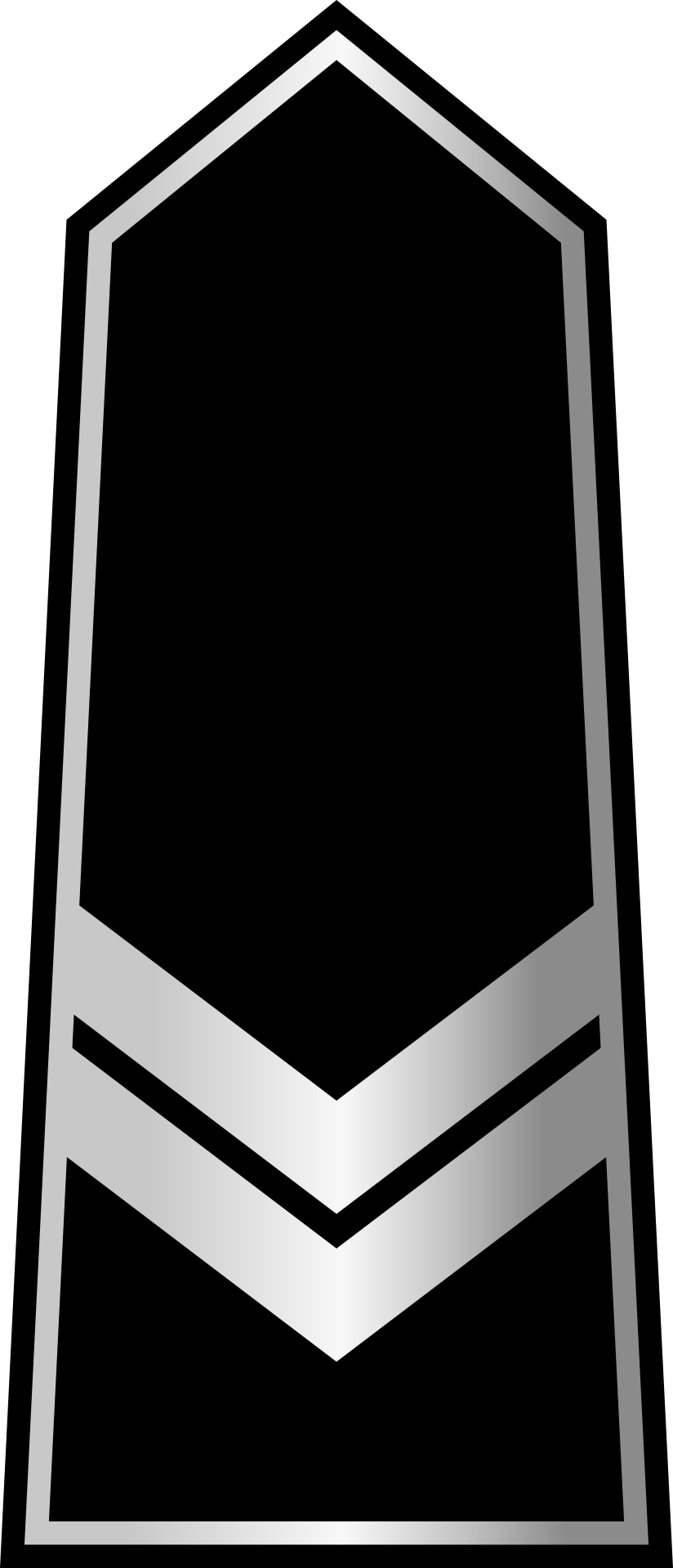
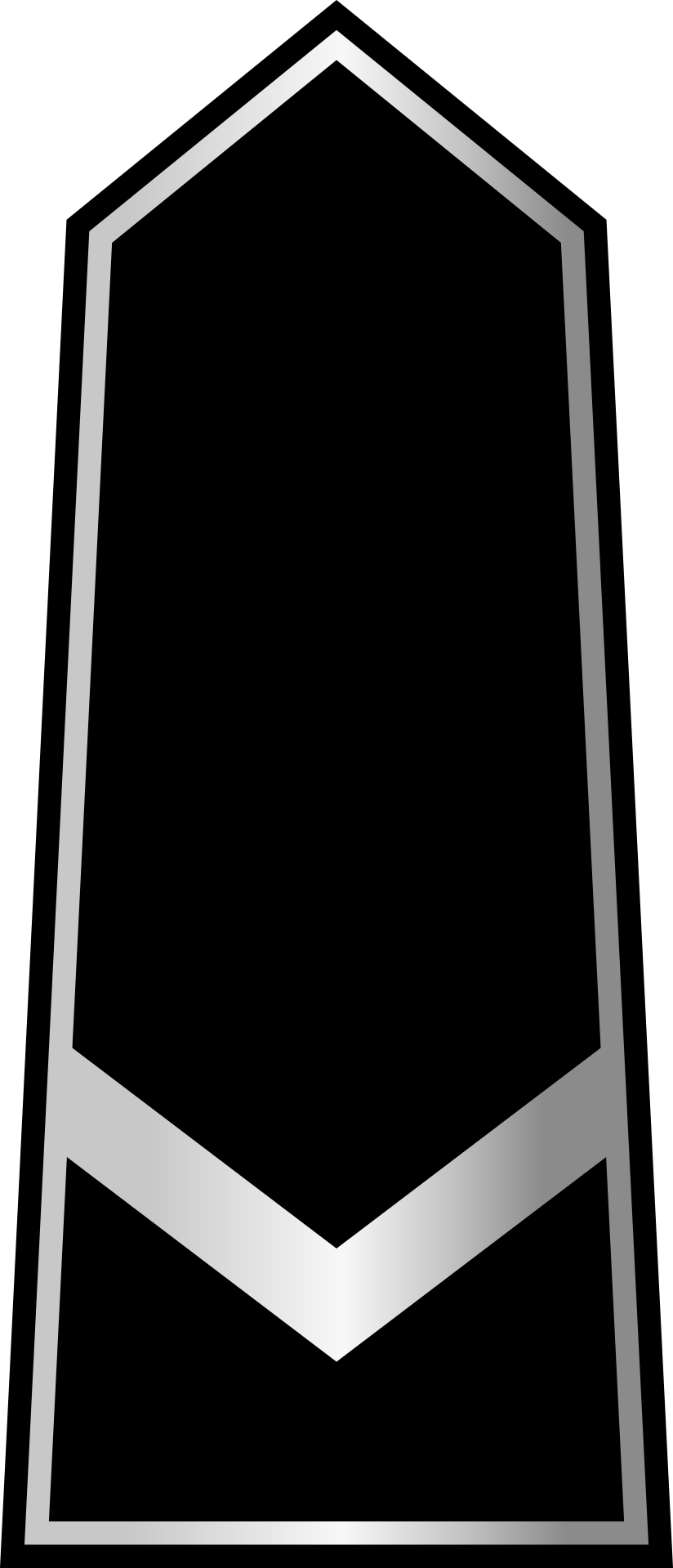
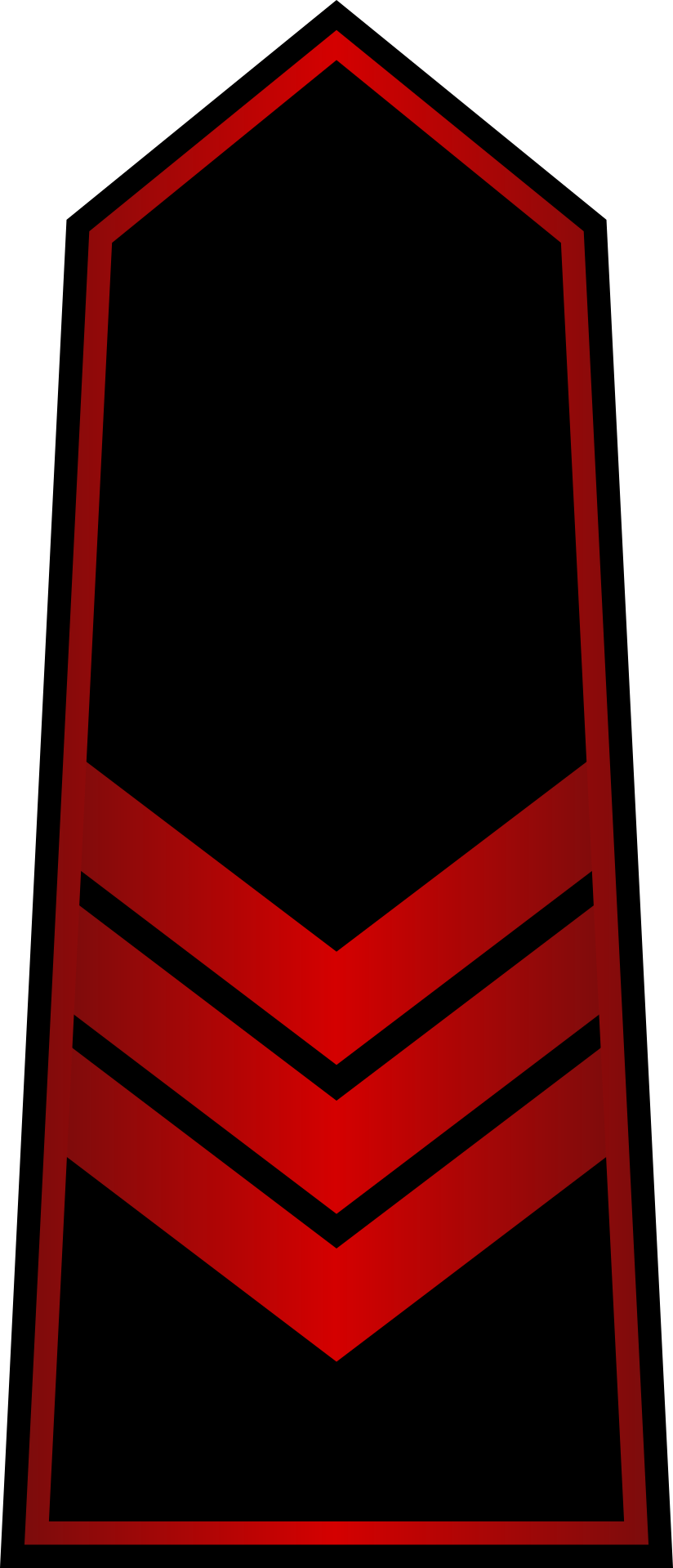
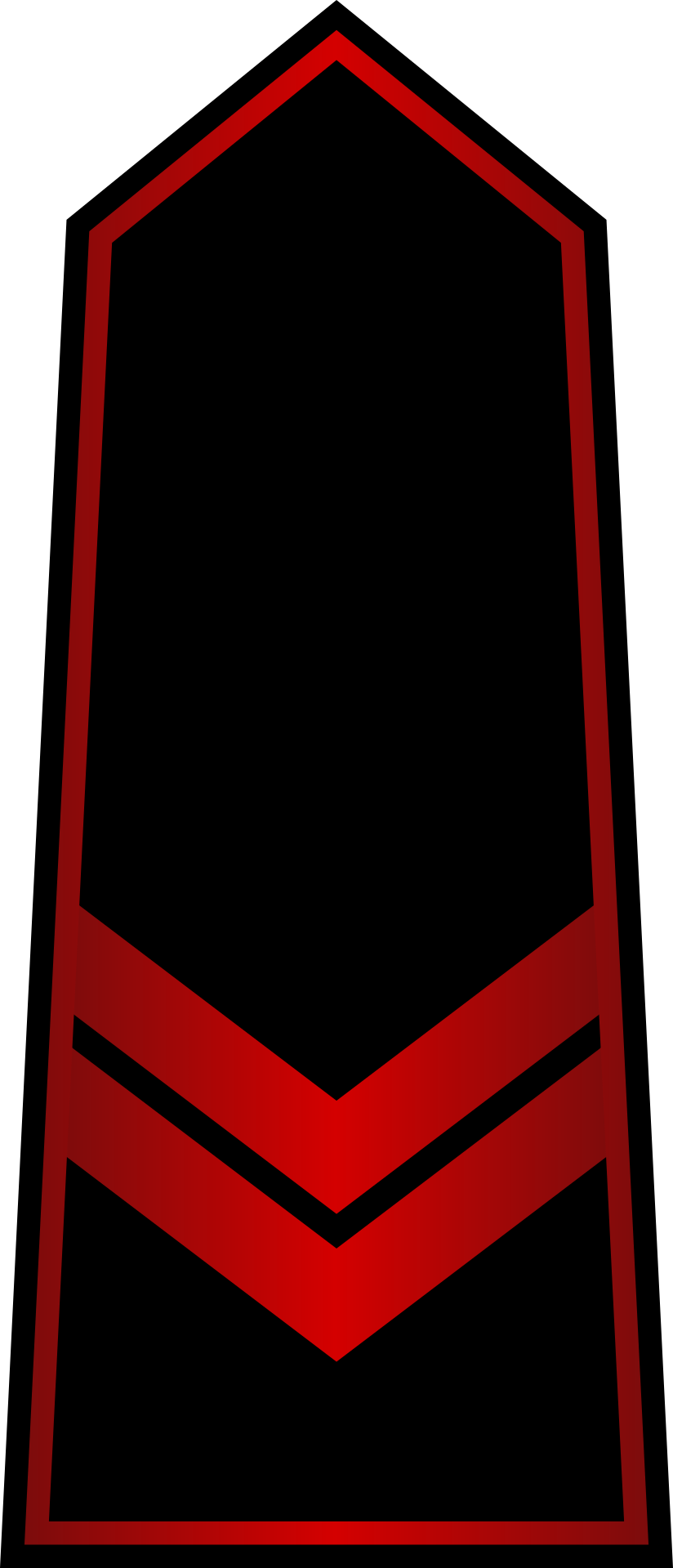
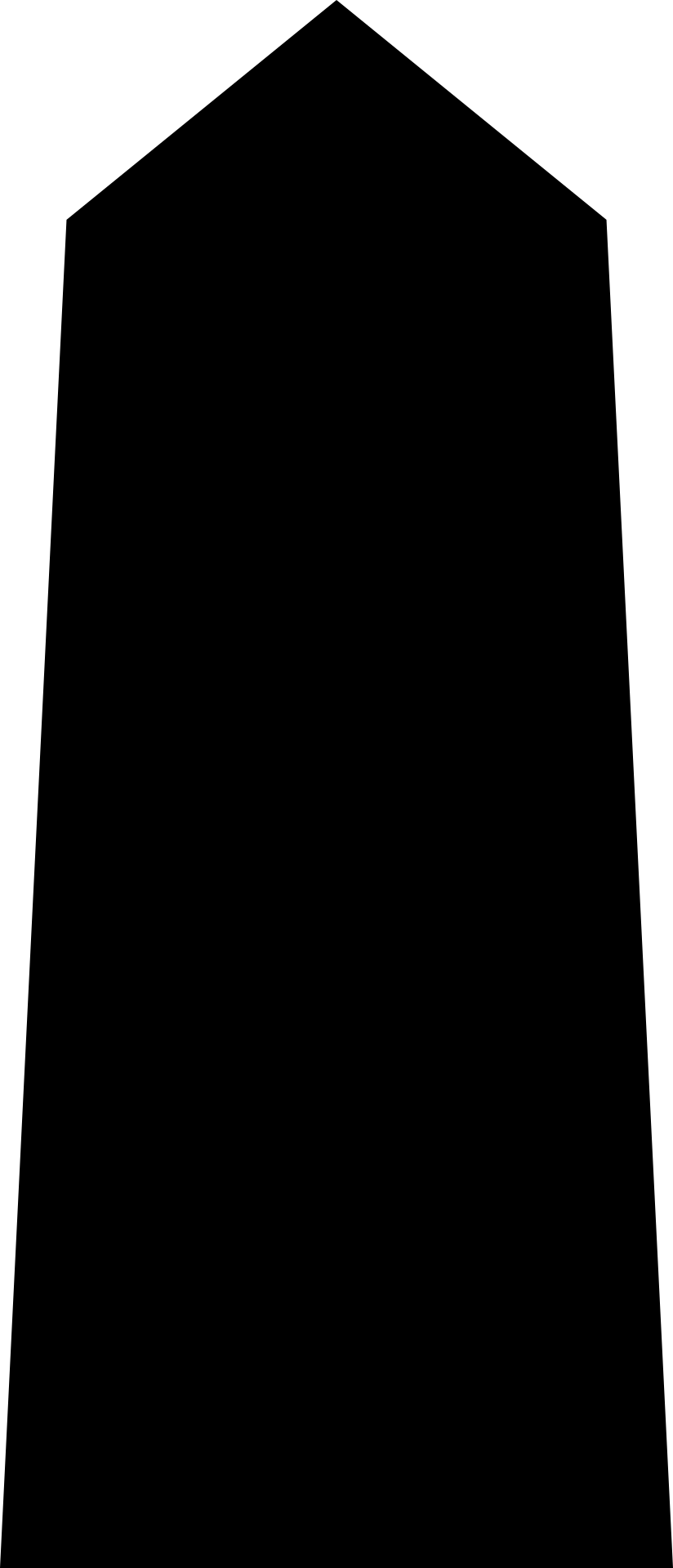
Rank group	Senior NCOs					Junior NCOs		Enlisted
Tunisian Army
Tunisian Army	وكيل أعلى; Wakil 'aelaa	وكيل أول; Wakil 'awal	وكيل; Wakil	عريف أول; Earif 'awal	عريف; Earif	رقيب أول; Raqib 'awal	رقيب; Raqib	جندي أول; Jundiun awwal	جندي متطوع; Jundiun
Tunisian Army	Major	Adjudant-chef	Adjudant	Sergent-chef	Sergent	Caporal-chef	Caporal	Soldat de 1^{re} classe	Soldat
Tunisian National Navy
Tunisian National Navy	وكيل أعلى بالبحرية; Wakil 'aelaa bialbahria	وكيل أول بالبحرية; Wakil 'awal bialbahria	وكيل بالبحرية; Wakil bialbahria	عريف أول بالبحرية; Earif 'awal bialbahria	عريف بالبحرية; Earif bialbahria	رقيب أول بالبحرية; Raqib 'awal bialbahria	رقيب بالبحرية; Raqib bialbahria	جندي أول بحرية; Jundiun awwal bialbahria	جندي متطوع بحرية; Jundiun bialbahria
Tunisian National Navy	Maître-principal	Premier maître	Maître	Second maître de 1^{ère} classe	Second maître de 2^{ème} classe	Quartier-maitre de 1^{ère} classe	Quartier-maitre de 2^{ème} classe	Matelot breveté	Matelot
Tunisian Air Force
Tunisian Air Force	وكيل أعلى; Wakil 'aelaa	وكيل أول; Wakil 'awal	وكيل; Wakil	عريف أول; Earif 'awal	عريف; Earif	رقيب أول; Raqib 'awal	رقيب; Raqib	جندي أول; Jundiun awwal	جندي متطوع; Jundiun
Tunisian Air Force	Major	Adjudant-chef	Adjudant	Sergent-chef	Sergent	Caporal-chef	Caporal	Soldat de 1^{re} classe	Soldat
Tunisian National Guard
Tunisian National Guard	وكيل أول; Wakil 'awal		وكيل; Wakil	عريف أول; Earif 'awal	عريف; Earif	رقيب أول; Raqib 'awal	رقيب; Raqib		جندي متطوع; Jundiun
Tunisian National Guard	Adjudant-chef		Adjudant	Sergent-chef	Sergent	Caporal-chef	Caporal		Soldat
Rank group	Senior NCOs					Junior NCOs		Enlisted
