= List of wars involving Tunisia =

This is a list of wars involving the Republic of Tunisia and its predecessor states.

== Hafsid dynasty (1229–1574) ==
Conflict	Allie(s)	Enemie(s)	Result
Eighth Crusade (1270)	Hafsid dynasty	Kingdom of France	Hafsid Victory: Treaty of Tunis; Death of Louis IX; Opening of trade with Tunis; Withdrawal of the Crusaders from Tunisia
Battle of Temzezdekt (1327)	Hafsid dynasty	Kingdom of Tlemcen	Defeat: Zayyanid Victory
Battle of er-Rias (1329)	Hafsid dynasty	Kingdom of Tlemcen	Defeat: Zayyanid Victory
Capture of Tunis (1329) (1329)	Hafsid dynasty	Kingdom of Tlemcen	Defeat: Tunis becomes a vassal of the Zayyanids until May 1330
Siege of Béjaïa (1326-1329) (1326-1329)	Hafsid dynasty	Kingdom of Tlemcen	Victory: Zayyanids failed to capture Bejaïa
Barbary Crusade (1390)	Hafsid dynasty Kingdom of Tlemcen	Republic of Genoa; Kingdom of France	Victory: Crusader withdrawal.
Bona crusade (1399)	Sultanate of Tunis	Crown of Aragon	Victory: Aragonese armies retreat.; Peace Treaty with Crown of Aragon.
Siege of Malta (1429)	Hafsid dynasty	Kingdom of Sicily; Malta	Withdrawal: Looting of Maltese cities.
Capture of Béjaïa (1510) (1510)	Hafsids of Béjaïa	Ottoman Empire; Spain	Defeat: Béjaïa lost to the Spanish.
Conquest of Tunis (1534)	Hafsid dynasty	Ottoman Empire	Defeat: Tunis under Ottoman rule.
Conquest of Tunis (1535)	Ottoman Empire	Hafsid dynasty Spain	Defeat: Tunis under Spanish rule.
Conquest of Tunis (1574)	Hafsid dynasty Spain	Ottoman Empire	Defeat: Tunis back under Ottoman rule.

== Ottoman Tunis (1574–1705) ==
Conflict	Allie(s)	Enemie(s)	Result
Battle of Hammamet (1605)	Eyalet of Tunis	Spanish Empire: Kingdom of Sicily; (Sovereign Military Order of Malta) Knights Hospitaller	Victory
Morean War (1684–1699)	Ottoman Empire: Eyalet of Egypt; Eyalet of Tripolitania; Eyalet of Tunis	Republic of Venice (Sovereign Military Order of Malta) Knights of Malta; Duchy of Savoy	Defeat: Morea ceded to Venice; Venetian gains in inland Dalmatia
Tunisian–Algerian War (1694)	Eyalet of Tunis	Deylik of Algiers; Support: Pashalik of Tripolitania	Defeat: Muradid Defeat; Occupation Of the Regency of Tunis
Maghrebi war (1699–1702)	Eyalet of Tunis Sultanate of Morocco Pashalik of Tripoli (1699–1700)	Deylik of Algiers Pashalik of Tripoli (1700–1702)	Defeat: Algerian ambitions halted; Morocco fails to expand; Fall of the Muradid dynasty

== Beylik of Tunis (1705–1881) ==
Conflict	Allie(s)	Enemie(s)	Result
Tunisian-Algerian War (1735); Part of the Tunisian-Algerian Wars	Ottoman Tunisia	Regency of Algiers	Algerian victory: Capture of Tunis; Tunis becomes a part of Algiers; Tunis becomes a vassal of Algiers
Tabarka expedition (1742)	Ottoman Tunisia	Kingdom of France	Victory
Tunisian-Algerian War (1756)	Tunis (Sovereign Military Order of Malta) Malta	Algiers	Algerian victory: Capture of Tunis; Tunis becomes a tributary of Algiers; Tunis recognises the suzerainty of the Dey of Algiers; Tunis becomes a tributary of Algiers and recognises Algerian suzerainty for more than 50 years
Tunisian-Venetian War (1784–1792)	Beylik of Tunis	Republic of Venice	Victory: Tunisia victory. Republic of Venice pays huge compensation to Tunisia.
1793–95 Tripolitanian Civil War (1793–1795)	Karamanli dynasty supporters Beylik of Tunis	Tripolitania Eyalet	Victory: Karamanli dynasty restored to the throne of Tripolitania; Weakening of Ottoman rule over Tripolitania
Tunisian-Algerian War (1807)	Beylik of Tunis	Deylik of Algiers: Beylik of Constantine	Victory: Tunisian victory.; Complete liberation from the guardianship of The Dey of Algeria; Stabilization of the border
Greek War of Independence (1821–1829); Part of the revolutions during the 1820s	Ottoman Empire Supported by: Egypt; Regency of Algiers; Tripolitania; Tunis; Danubian Sich	Greek Revolutionaries In detail: Klephts; Armatoloi; Filiki Eteria (Note: Only in 1821); Sacred Band; Messenian Senate; Peloponnesian Senate (Note: From 1821–1823.); Senate of Western Continental Greece; Areopagus of Eastern Continental Greece; Temporary regime of Crete; Military-Political System of Samos; After 1822: First Hellenic Republic; Military support: (First Hellenic Republic) Philhellenes; Carbonari revolutionaries; Serbian revolutionaries; Romanian revolutionaries (Note: From 1821.); Russian Empire (Note: From 1826.); Kingdom of France; United Kingdom; Diplomatic support: Haiti (Note: Haiti was the first nation to recognize the independence of Greece.); United States	Greek victory (Note: London Protocol (1830), London Conference of 1832, Treaty of Constantinople (1832)): Independence of Greece; The Peloponnese, Saronic Islands, Cyclades, Sporades and Continental Greece ceded to the independent Greek state; Crete ceded to Egypt
Crimean War (1853–1856); Part of the Scramble for Africa	Ottoman Empire; France (Note: From 1854); United Kingdom (Kingdom of Sardinia) Sardinia (Note: From 1855)	Russia Greece (Note: Until 1854)	Allied victory: Russia loses the Danube Delta and Southern Bessarabia
Mejba Revolt (1864-1865)	Tunisia; Support: France; Britain; Ottoman Empire	Tunisian rebels: Rahmaniyya	Victory of Tunisia
Conquest of Tunisia (1881); Part of the Scramble for Africa	Tunisia	France	French victory: Tunisia becomes a French protectorate

== French Tunisia (1881-1956) ==
Conflict	Allie(s)	Enemie(s)	Result
Tunisian campaign (1942–1943); Part of the North African campaign of the Second World War	United Kingdom: India; Newfoundland; United States; Free France; Australia; New Zealand; South Africa; (Kingdom of Greece) Greece	Italy; Germany	Allied victory: Tunisia returns to French administration
Tunisian Fellaghas (1952–1956)	Liberation Army (1952-1956): Multiple bands; Tunisian Liberation Army (1956)	France: La Main Rouge; Kingdom of Tunisia (1956)	Inconclusive: Establishment of the Kingdom of Tunisia in 1956; Fellaghas are disbanded by police and military operations

== Republic of Tunisia (1957-present) ==
Conflict	Allie(s)	Enemie(s)	Result
Bizerte Crisis (1961); Part of the decolonisation of Africa and the spillover of the Algerian War	Tunisia	France	French victory: Evacuation of the Bizerte base on 15 October 1963
October War (1973); Part of the Arab–Israeli conflict and the Cold War	Egypt; Syria; Expeditionary forces Saudi Arabia Algeria Jordan Libya Iraq Kuwait Tunisia Morocco Cuba North Korea	Israel	Defeat: At the final ceasefire: Egyptian forces held 1,200 km^{2} (460 sq mi) on the eastern bank of the canal.; Israeli forces held 1,600 km^{2} (620 sq mi) on the western bank of the canal.; Israeli forces held 500 km^{2} (193 sq mi) of the Syrian Bashan region of the Golan Heights.
1980 Gafsa Uprising (1980); Part of the Cold War and the Arab Cold War	Tunisia; Supported by: United States; Sixth Fleet; France; Morocco	Arab Nationalist Rebels; Supported by: Libya; Algeria	Tunisian governmental victory
Battle of Wazzin (2011); Part of the 2011 Nafusa Mountains Campaign	(Libya) Anti-Gaddafi forces: National Liberation Army; Tunisia: Tunisian Army; Tunisian Police	Libyan Arab Jamahiriya	Anti-Gaddafi victory: Loyalist forces occasionally shelled the crossing for months afterward.; Fighting ongoing after the Libyan Army clashes with the Tunisian Army; Rebel forces capture Wazzin on 21 April.; Loyalist forces retake the border crossing on 28 April.; Rebels retake Wazzin on 4 May
Chaambi Operations (2012–2019); Part of the insurgency in the Maghreb	Tunisia	Ansar al-Sharia; AQIM; Uqba ibn Nafi Brigade	Tunisian victory: Tunisian National Guard eliminates Okba Ibn Nafaa commanders on 28 March 2015 and continues to eliminate many more afterwards.; Declaration of certain mountain areas as military locked zones that require prior authorization to enter for non-military entities.
Raoued Operation (2014); Part of the Insurgency in the Maghreb (2002–present)	Tunisia	Ansar al-Sharia	Tunisian victory
ISIL insurgency in Tunisia (2015–2022); Part of the spillover of the Second Libyan Civil War, the Arab Winter, war on terror and War against the Islamic State	Tunisia: Tunisian National Guard; Tunisian Army; Tunisian Police	Islamic State: Islamic State – Libya Province; Islamic State – Algeria Province; Islamic State – Tunisia Province; Uqba ibn Nafi Brigade; Ansar al-Sharia (only in March 2016)	Tunisian victory

== See also ==
- Hilalian invasion of Ifriqiya
- Battle of Balaclava
- Battle of Monte Cassino
- Operation Wooden Leg

== Notes and references ==
=== Cited sources ===
- Morris, Benny (2011). Righteous Victims: A History of the Zionist-Arab Conflict, 1881-2001. New York: Vintage Books. ISBN 978-0-679-42120-7.
- O'Ballance, Edgar (1979). No Victor, No Vanquished: The Yom Kippur War. Presidio Press. ISBN 978-0-89141-017-1.
- Rabinovich, Abraham (2004). The Yom Kippur War: The Epic Encounter That Transformed the Middle East. New York: Schocken Books. ISBN 978-0-8052-4176-1.
- Shazly, Lieutenant General Saad el (2003). The Crossing of the Suez (Revised ed.). American Mideast Research. ISBN 978-0-9604562-2-2.
