= Battle of Ben Guerdane =

2016 Battle in Tunisia

- Part of the Islamic State insurgency in Tunisia and the spillover of the Libyan Civil War (2014–2020)
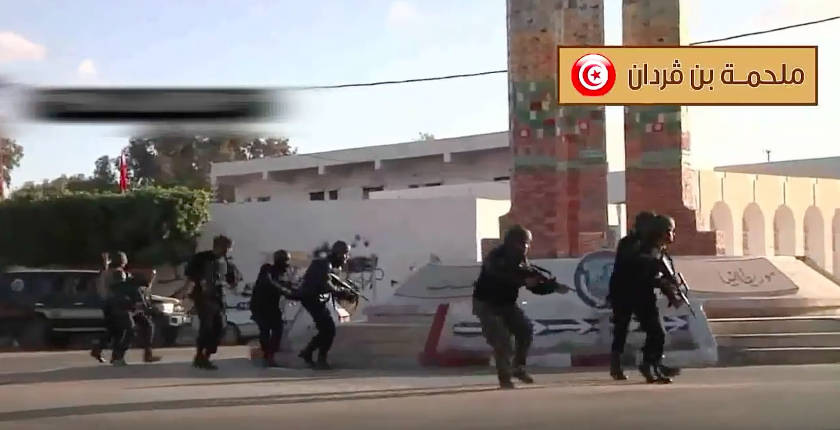
- Security forces during the attack
| Date | 7–9 March 2016 (2 days) |
| Location | Ben Gardane, Medenine Governorate, Tunisia |
| Result | Tunisian victory |

Belligerents
| Islamic State in Libya; Ansar al-Sharia (Tunisia) | Tunisia: Tunisian Army; Tunisian National Guard; (Tunisia) Police Force and Customs Officials |

Commanders and leaders
| Various | Habib Essid; Beji Caid Essebsi; Farhat Horchani (Minister of National Defense); General Ismaïl Fathali (Army Chief of Staff); Samir Naqi (Senior police official); Mohamed Maali (Head of counter-terrorism department); Colonel Abdel Atti Abdelkabir (executed) (Local anti-terror security chief) |

Strength
| ~100 fighters | Unknown |

Casualties and losses
| 35–55 killed 52 captured | 13 killed 14 wounded |
- 7 civilians killed 3 civilians wounded
- † Head of counter-terrorism division assassinated in home by militants.

The Battle of Ben Guerdane occurred on March 7, 2016, in the city of Ben Gardane in Tunisia on the border with Libya. Islamic State forces attempted to seize the city, but were repulsed by the Tunisian military. The clashes continued also on 8 and 9 March in the area.

== The attack ==
Armed groups of militants from the Islamic State in Libya and Ansar al-Sharia began the attack on the town by grouping around and seizing the local mosque. The mosque loudspeakers were used to broadcast a message and a signal for the attack on government facilities. The Tunisian National Guard, military barracks, and police posts were simultaneously ambushed, in an attempt to take over Ben Guerdane and establish an "emirate" within Tunisia. The fighting continued between the attackers and Tunisian military and police reinforcements, until clashes ended in mid-morning, and continued pursuit operations in the vicinity lasted the rest of the day.

== Casualties ==
The Ministry of Interior and the Ministry of National Defense put the death toll at 55 armed militants, 13 security forces members and seven civilians.

== Reactions ==
- United Nations: United Nations Security Council condemned “in the strongest terms” the terrorist attack. In a statement, the council considered that “any acts of terrorism are criminal and unjustifiable, regardless of their motivation, wherever, whenever and by whomsoever committed.” It also “underlined the need to bring perpetrators... of these reprehensible acts of terrorism to justice,” reaffirming “the need for all States to combat” this scourge by all means.

== See also ==
- 2014 Chaambi Mountains attack
- 2015 Bardo National Museum attack
- 2015 Sousse attacks
- 2015 Tunis bombing

== Bibliography ==
- Epopee of Ben Guerdane: Secrets and Mysteries of the Battle of March 2016, Editions Sotumedias, Tunis, 2020 ISBN 9789938918762.
