= Tunisian military special forces =

The Special Forces Group, (فوج القوات الخاصة Ar), (Groupe des Forces Spéciales Fr), or simply the G.F.S. is the Special force troops of The Tunisian Land Army.

The GFS can easily be recognized from the rest of the army due to their camouflage and green beret.
