= 2015 Tunis bombing =

Islamic State terror attack in Tunisia

Coordinates: 36.8110°N 10.1846°E

- Part of Islamic State insurgency in Tunisia
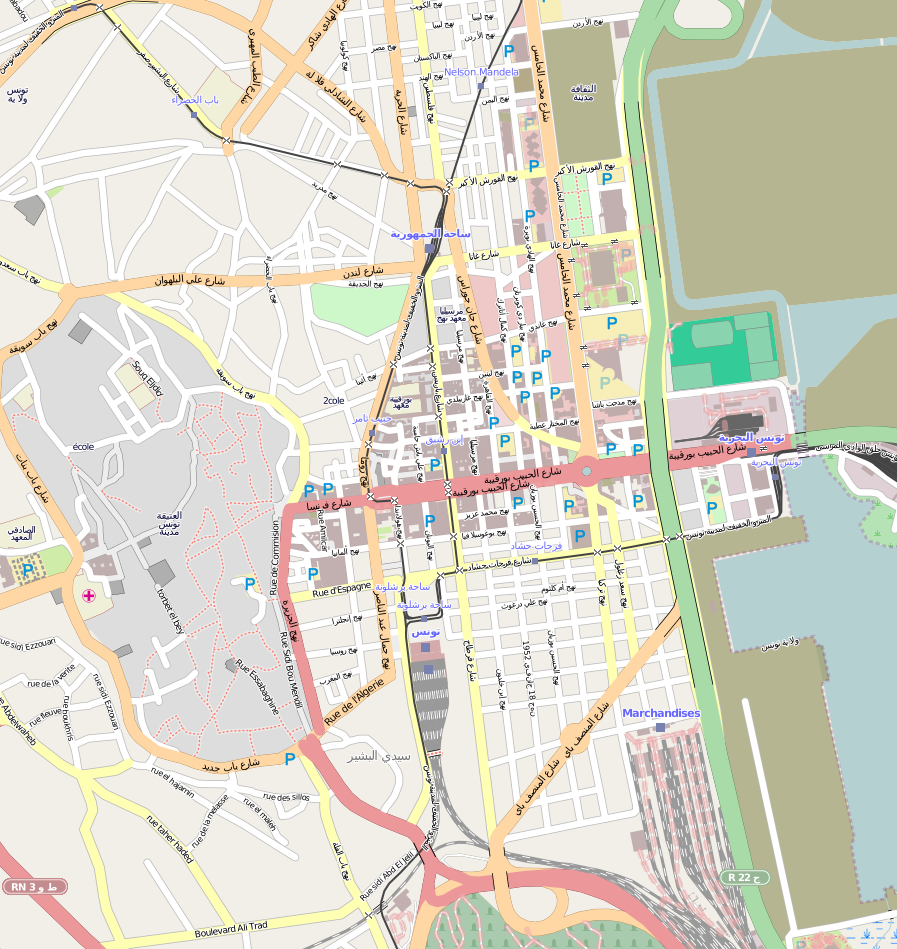
- 2015 Tunis bombing (Tunis) 2015 Tunis bombing (Tunisia)
- Location: Tunis, Tunisia
- Date: 24 November 2015
- Target: Presidential escorts
- Attack type: Suicide bombing
- Weapon: Semtex explosive belt
- Deaths: 14 (including the perpetrator)
- Injuries: 16
- Perpetrator: Houssem Abdelli

On 24 November 2015, a bus carrying Tunisian presidential guards exploded, killing 12, on a principal road in Tunis, Tunisia. IS claimed responsibility for the attack. The bomber, who also died in the attack, was identified as Houssem Abdelli.

== Bombing ==
On 24 November 2015, at least 12 people were killed in a bus bombing in Tunis, the capital of Tunisia. The bus was carrying members of the Tunisian Presidential Security guard. The blast happened when the vehicle was parked near a main artery in the Tunisian capital where guard members are typically picked up and dropped off, according to an official in the Tunisian Prime Minister's office.

The explosion, described as an "attack" by presidential spokesman Moez Sinaoui, struck on the capital's Mohamed V Avenue, a ministry official told AFP. An AFP journalist reported seeing the partly burnt out shell of the bus, with police, ambulances, and fire trucks at the scene.

The bomber was identified as Houssem Abdelli, a 28-year-old resident of Tunis. The man's mother identified him from a photograph.

== Response ==
The Tunisian Interior Ministry announced that this was an act of terrorism, using a Semtex explosive traced to Libya. The Islamic State militant group claimed responsibility for the attack in an online statement, though authorities did not discuss any ties between the bomber and extremist groups.

The group has also claimed responsibility for two attacks in Tunisia earlier in the year, targeting the tourism industry: the Bardo museum attack in March and an attack on a beach resort in Sousse in June.

After the attack, President Beji Caid Essebsi placed Tunis under curfew and resumed a month-long state of emergency. The Tunisian Interior Ministry reported that national security raids had led to the arrest of 40 people with suspected ties to terrorist groups. Among the people arrested were the suspected bomber's sister and mother. The Tunisian government's Security Council shut down Facebook accounts and websites linked to terrorist groups.

== See also ==
- 2014 Chaambi Mountains attack
- 2015 Sousse attacks
- Bardo National Museum attack
- Ghriba synagogue bombing
