= Islamic State – Tunisia Province =

Islamic militant organization, 2014–2024

Jund al-Khilafah in Tunisia
- جند الخلافة في تونس
- Leader: Ashraf al-Qizani
- Dates active: September 2014 – present
- Allegiance: Islamic State
- Ideology: Islamic Statism
- Size: 100 (2018)
- Wars: Islamic State insurgency in Tunisia

Jund al-Khilafah in Tunisia (Arabic: جند الخلافة في تونس, romanized: Jund al-khilāfah fī Tūnis, lit. 'Soldiers of the Caliphate in Tunisia', JAK-T) also known as Islamic State – Tunisia Province (Arabic: الدولة الإسلامية – ولاية تونس, romanized: al-Dawlah al-Islāmīyah – Wilāyat Tūnis, IS–TP) is a militant organization affiliated with the Islamic State based in Tunisia.

== History ==
Jund al-Khilafah in Tunisia was established in September 2014 after another militant organization in Tunisia, Uqba ibn Nafi Brigade, defected from their original leaders of al-Qaeda in the Islamic Maghreb and gave bay'ah to then-"caliph" of the Islamic State, Abu Bakr al-Baghdadi, Jund al-Khilafah in Tunisia did the same. Jund al-Khilafah and Uqba ibn Nafi Brigade heavily competed for land and power, especially with the pro-Al-Qaeda branch of Uqba ibn Nafi Brigade but both organizations only achieved little success against Tunisia. The conflict between Jund al-Khilafah and Uqba ibn Nafi Brigade resulted in the deaths of many civilians and Tunisian security forces with both groups seeing more members in 2015, but Tunisian forces still had relative control over the situation and the insurgency wasn't as widespread. As of 2018, Jund al-Khilafah only has around 100 members. During its early years active, Jund al-Khilafah made large and sporadic attacks in order to get the attention of the higher leadership of the Islamic State to become known as an official wilayat (province). Throughout 2015, the group established itself in lower-income areas of Tunisia like the town of Kasserine and through the areas of the Chambi mountains. Jund al-Khilafah has attempted to recruit Tunisian youth through social media using tactics that the Islamic State uses through their social media use. Working alongside the Islamic State – Algeria Province, Jund al-Khilafah expanded operation outside of Tunisia and into Algeria which caused joint operations with Tunisia and Algeria to eliminate factions of Jund al-Khilafah inside Algeria since they based themselves on the border region of Kasserine Governorate.

In 2015, under the name Islamic State – Tunisia Province, released a video entitled "Soon, Soon" showed their strongholds in Tunisia. With this, there were plans on establishing Jund al-Khilafah as an official wilayah (province) of the Islamic State.

On March 31, 2015, Jund al-Khilafah would claim responsibility for an attack against a museum in Bardo on March 18, 2015 via a YouTube video where an anonymous Arab speaker would state "We give you the glad tidings that we are soldiers of the Islamic State in your land — Jund al-Khilafah, soldiers of the Caliph Abu Bakr, may Allah preserve him". The attack killed 22 people, mainly foreign tourists.

In January 2019, the Tunisian government would freeze assets belonging to Jund al-Khilafah and charge 40 members of Jund al-Khilafah with terrorism-related charges.

In July 2019, the Islamic State official media office released multiple videos entitled "The Best Outcome is for the Pious" which showed many provinces and new provinces pledging allegiance, or renewing their pledges, to then-leader of the Islamic State, Abu Bakr al-Baghdadi, which included the newly established Tunisia Province.

In September 2020, Jund al-Khilafah would attack Tunisian national guards, killing one and wounding one.

On December 12, 2020, the United States designated the emir of Jund al-Khilafah, Ashraf al-Qizani also known as Abu 'Ubaydah al-Kafi, a specially designated global terrorist who, before becoming the leader, served as a member of the group's Majlis al-Shura.

In January 2020, it was revealed that the leader of Jund al-Khilafah, Ashraf al-Qizani (full name being Ashraf bin Fathi Al-Qizani), was in hiding in western Libya.

On December 7, 2022, a photo set was released by Tunisia Wilayah (Tunisia Province) of the Islamic State where members pledged allegiance to the new leader of the Islamic State Abu al-Hussein al-Husseini al-Qurashi.

In April 2024, multiple members of Jund al-Khilafah were arrested by specialized units of the General Administration of the National Army and National Guard of Tunisia.

In December 2024, two members of Jund al-Khilafah, Raed Al-Tawati and Yassin Al-Qanouni, would be sentenced to death after a verdict was reached for participating in the ambush of Tunisian soldiers in Jabal Al-Shaanbi in the Qasrin Governorate on July 29, 2013 which killed 12 Tunisian soldiers. As a result of this, Tunisia tightened their laws and made them stricter on terrorist activities.
