= Ismaïl Fathali =

- Born: 3 November 1958 (age 67); Béja, Tunisia
- Allegiance: Tunisia
- Branch: Tunisian Army
- Service years: 1983–present
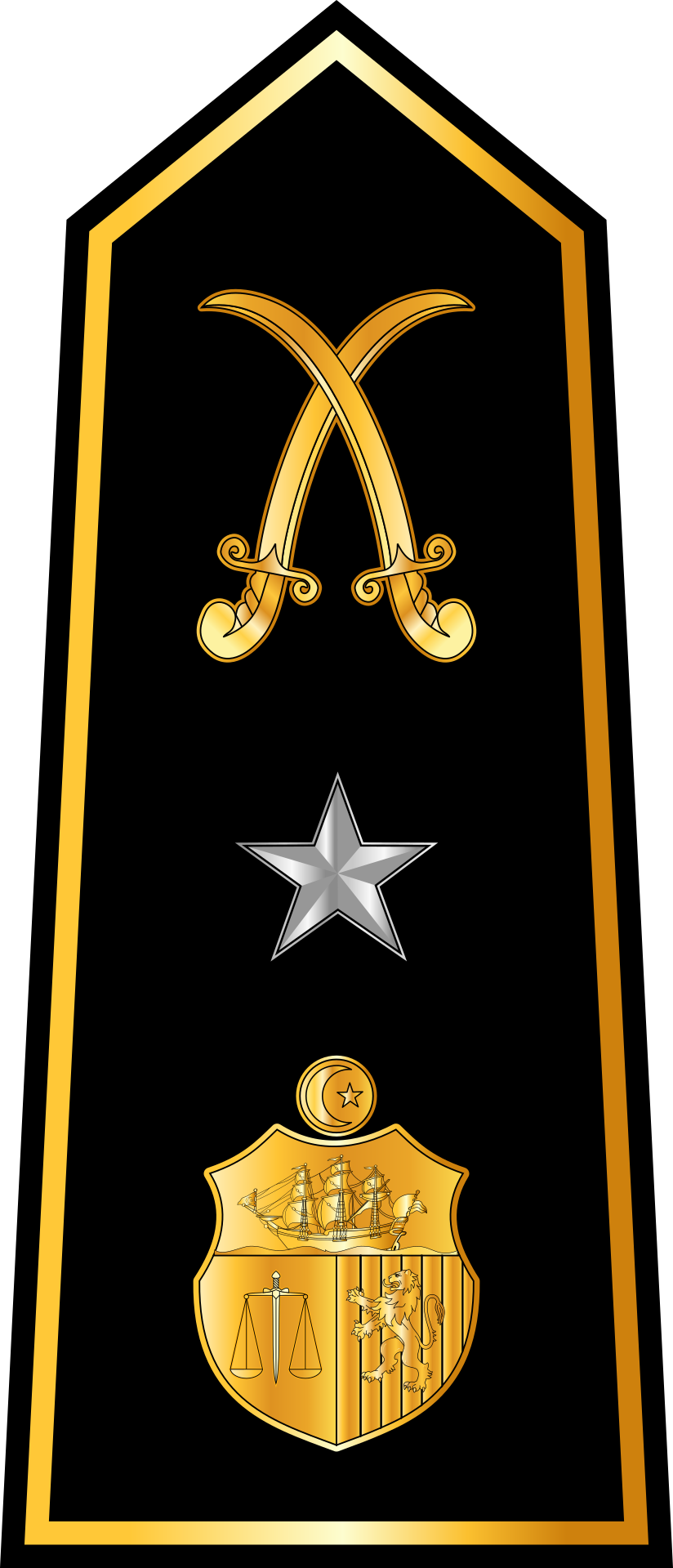
- Rank: Brigadier General
- Commands: Tunisian Army Chief of Staff; Director General of weapons and ammunition 1st Armoured Infantry Brigade; 31st armored regiment 32sd armored regiment
- Conflicts: Chaambi Operations
- Awards: United Nations Medal; Military Medal; Badge of Honor 1st Class

Ismaïl Fathali (born November 3, 1958, in Béja), is a Tunisian general appointed on August 12, 2014, by then-president Moncef Marzouki as Tunisian Army Chief of Staff.
