= Arab Winter =

Violence and instability after the 2010–12 Arab Spring

- Part of the aftermath of the Arab Spring and the war on terror
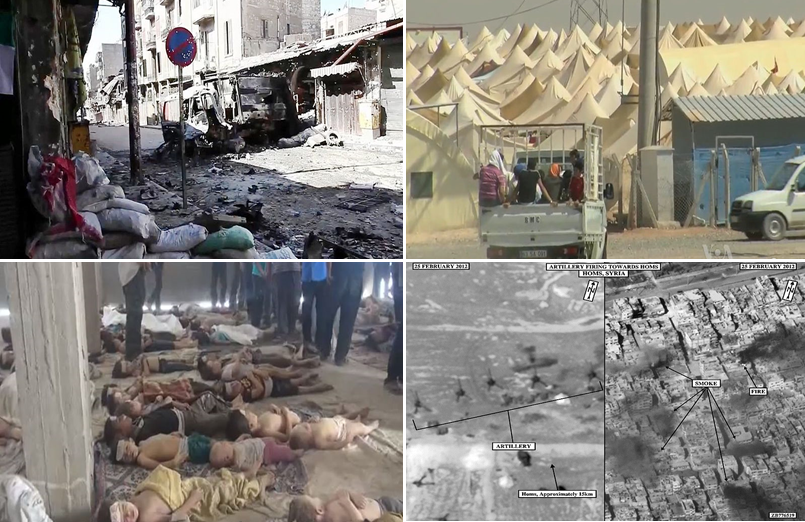
- Montage of the Syrian Civil War, one of the principal conflicts of the Arab Winter
- Date: 2014–2024 (10 years) (ongoing in some countries)
- Location: Middle East and North Africa, especially Syria, Iraq, Tunisia, Egypt, Yemen and Libya
- Caused by: Arab Spring; War on terror
- Result: European migrant crisis; Authoritarian crackdown against political Islam and democratic reforms in Egypt, Syria and other Arab countries including the election in 2014 of the Sisi government in Egypt; Rise of ISIS, resurgence of Al-Qaeda in Yemen and Syria, an influx of foreign fighters fighting for these groups, including insurgencies in Tunisia and Egypt, and multiple terrorist attacks; First Libyan Civil War; Second Libyan Civil War; Syrian Civil War; Yemeni Civil War; War in Iraq (2013–2017); Egyptian Crisis

The Arab Winter (Arabic: الشتاء العربي, romanized: ash-shitāʼ al-ʻarabī) is the resurgence of authoritarianism and Islamic extremism in some Arab countries in the 2010s in the aftermath of the Arab Spring. The term "Arab Winter" refers to the events across Arab League countries in the Middle East and North Africa, including the Syrian civil war, the Iraqi insurgency and subsequent war in Iraq, the Egyptian Crisis, the Libyan crisis including the first and second civil wars, and the Yemeni crisis including the Yemeni civil war.

The term was coined by Chinese political scientist Zhang Weiwei during a debate with American political scientist Francis Fukuyama on 27 June 2011. Fukuyama believed the Arab Spring movement would spread to China, while Zhang predicted the Arab Spring would soon turn into an Arab Winter.

According to scholars of the University of Warsaw, the Arab Spring fully devolved into the Arab Winter in 2014, four years after its onset. The Arab Winter is characterized by the emergence of multiple regional wars, mounting regional instability, economic and demographic decline of Arab countries, and ethno-religious sectarian strife. According to a study by the American University of Beirut, by the summer of 2014, the Arab Winter had resulted in nearly a quarter of a million deaths and millions of refugees. Perhaps the most significant event of the Arab Winter was the rise of the Islamic State, which controlled swathes of land in the region from 2014 to 2019.

In 2020, several armed conflicts that could be seen as results of the Arab Spring were ongoing. The Syrian civil war, as of mid-2020, had caused massive political instability and economic hardship in Syria, with the Syrian currency plunging to new lows. Further, as of mid-2020, a civil war and subsequent intervention by Saudi Arabia continued in Yemen.

== Definition ==
The term Arab Winter typically includes the following events:

Country	Event	Start year
Syria	Syrian civil war	2011
Iraq	Iraqi insurgency (2011–2013)	2011
Iraq	War in Iraq (2013–2017)	2013
Egypt	Egyptian Crisis (2011–2014)	2011
Egypt	Sinai Insurgency	2011
Egypt	2013 Egyptian coup d'état	2013
Libya	Libyan crisis	2011
Libya	First Libyan civil war	2011
Libya	Second Libyan civil war	2014
Yemen	Yemeni civil war (2014–present)	2014
Lebanon	Syrian civil war spillover in Lebanon	2011
Bahrain	2011 Bahraini uprising	2011
Tunisia	Islamic State insurgency in Tunisia	2015
Tunisia	2021 Tunisian self-coup	2021

=== Geography ===
Government overthrown more than once Government overthrown Civil war Protests and governmental changes Major protests Minor protests Other protests and militant action outside the Arab world

The term "Arab Winter" refers to the events across Arab League countries in the Middle East and North Africa, including the Syrian civil war, the Iraqi insurgency and the subsequent War in Iraq, the Egyptian Crisis, the First Libyan Civil War and the subsequent Second Libyan Civil War, and the Yemeni civil war. Events referred to as the Arab Winter include those in Egypt that led to the removal from office in 2013 of Mohamed Morsi and the subsequent election in 2014 of Abdel Fattah el-Sisi, as well as the Sinai insurgency.

Political developments, particularly the restoration of authoritarianism and suppression of civil liberties in Egypt since 3 July 2013, have been described as constituting a "military winter" that functioned in opposition to the goals of the Arab Spring. Various militias and tribes have started fighting in Libya after a breakdown in negotiations. The arenas of Lebanon and Bahrain were also identified as areas of the Arab Winter.

Libya was named as a scene of the Arab Winter, together with Syria, by Professor Sean Yom. The Northern Mali conflict was often described as part of the "Islamist Winter". Political changes which occurred in Tunisia, involving a change in government, as well as an ISIL insurgency, were also indicated by some as a possible "heading towards Arab Winter".

=== Beginning date ===
The first cases of usage of the term “Arab Winter” can be found since 1 February 2011.

Then, the Arab Winter term began circulating in the media in late 2012 and getting popular since then, referring to the deterioration of many Arab Spring conflicts into prolonged and escalating events of sectarian strife and armed violence. In its December 2012 publication, The Daily Telegraph referred to the year 2012 as the year of the Arab Winter.

According to scholars of the University of Warsaw, the Arab Spring fully devolved into the Arab Winter four years after its onset. This view was also supported by Prof. James Y. Simms Jr. in his 2015 opinion article for the Richmond Times-Dispatch. In early 2016, The Economist marked the situation across Arab world countries as "worse than ever", marking it as the ongoing Arab Winter.

== Impact ==
=== Economic impact ===
According to the Moshe Dayan Center for Middle Eastern and African Studies, as of January 2014, the cost of Arab Winter upheaval across the Arab World was some $800 billion USD. Some 16 million people in Syria, Egypt, Iraq, Jordan and Lebanon were expected to require humanitarian assistance in 2014.

According to The Economist, Malta has "benefitted" from the Arab Winter, as tourists who might otherwise be in Egypt or Tunisia opt for a safer alternative.

=== Casualties ===
According to a study by the American University of Beirut, as of the summer of 2014, the Arab Winter had resulted in nearly a quarter of a million deaths and millions of refugees.

Political columnist and commentator George Will reported that as of early 2017, over 30,000 lives had been lost in Libya, 220,000–320,000 had been killed in Syria and 4 million refugees had been produced by the Syrian Civil War alone.

The Arab Winter is still ongoing as of 2025. Casualties per crisis include:

- Syrian civil war – casualty figure at 570,000 killed and counting – Conflict ongoing
- 2011 Iraqi insurgency, 2013 civil war, and subsequent Islamic State insurgency – casualty figure at 220,000+ killed and counting – Civil war declared over in 2017, insurgency ongoing
- Yemeni civil war – casualty figure at 350,000+ killed and counting – Conflict ongoing
- Libyan Crisis – casualty figure 40,000+ killed and counting – Conflict ongoing
- Egyptian Crisis and Sinai insurgency – marked the start of the Arab winter, casualty figure 5,000+ killed and counting – Conflict declared over in 2023, sporadic attacks continue

=== Migrant crisis ===
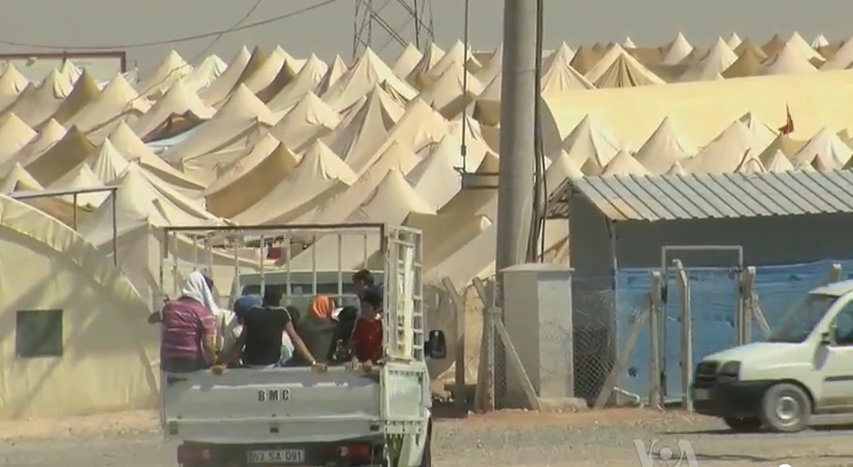
A Syrian refugee camp on the Turkish border for displaced people of the Syrian Civil War (2012)

The political turmoil and violence in the Middle East and North Africa resulted in massive population displacement in the region. As a result, "boat people", which was once commonly referred to Vietnamese boat people, became frequently used, including internally displaced persons and asylum-seekers and refugees who had previously been residing in Libya, Syria, and Iraq have headed towards the European Union.

The attempts by some Libyans, Syrians and Tunisians to seek safety from the violence by crossing the Mediterranean sea have triggered fears among European politicians and populations of arrivals that might "flood" their shores. This has spurred a flurry of legislative activity and patrolling of the waters to manage arrivals. Despite recent efforts at a common approach to migration by the European Union Hungary and Poland have not been convinced yet. Monetary support authorised by the German legislature for private rescue operations at sea have triggered Italian government animosity.

== See also ==
- List of modern conflicts in North Africa
- Spillover of the Syrian Civil War
- Iran–Saudi Arabia proxy conflict
- Second Arab Spring
- Lampedusa
- Gaza War
- Middle Eastern crisis (since 2023)
