= Tunisian Presidential Security =

Security force for the President of Tunisia

Tunisian Presidential Security is the apparatus responsible of the security of the President of Tunisia. It is an elite internal security unit under the Ministry of the Interior and also referred to as the PGF (Presidential Guard Forces).

== Structure ==
In 2011, there were said to be some 6,000 security personnel in the organisation.

Director Generals:

- Abderrahmen Haj Ali (?-1990)
- Ali Seriati (1990-January 16, 2011)
- Taoufik Dabbabi (January 16, 2011 – ?)
- Raouf Mrad (? - October 30, 2019)
- Khaled Yahyaoui (October 30, 2019 – Present)

== History ==
Presidential security began following the need for protection of the head of State after Tunisian independence in 1956 and this led to the founding of the Presidential Security Force on 18 April 1956. In 1975, the Ministry of the Interior became responsible for the Presidential Security Force and security also applied to other official figures in Tunisia.

The Security forces were involved in protecting the President during the Tunisian revolution but following removal of President Zine El Abidine Ben Ali in 2011, the paramilitary elements of the forces loyal to the former president were disbanded and the organisation reformatted. Former members of the Presidential Guard were investigated and charged at tribunal on human rights violations but were later acquitted including Ali Seriati, the former Director General of Presidential Security.

In the 2015 Tunis bombing 12 presidential guard members were killed.
