= 1980 Gafsa Uprising =

Attack led by rebels against the Tunisian authorities

Gafsa events
- Part of the Cold War and the Arab Cold War
Date	26 – 27 January 1980
Location	Gafsa, Tunisia
Result	Tunisian governmental victory

Belligerents
Tunisia; Supported by: United States; Sixth Fleet; France; Algeria; Morocco (Political support)	Rebels; Supported by: Libya

Commanders and leaders
	Ezzedine Chérif; Ahmed al-Marghani; Muammar Gaddafi

Strength
~300	60 militants

Casualties and losses
59 killed; 90+ wounded	3 killed; 42 detained; 11 executed

The Gafsa events refer to an armed operation conducted by Libyan-backed Tunisian nationalists in January 1980, during which they infiltrated and attacked the Tunisian city of Gafsa. The attackers gained control of most city centers, but their attempts to incite a revolt among the residents failed. Tunisian security and military forces eventually recaptured the city and apprehended the attackers, including their leader Ezzedine Chérif. The operation significantly strained relations between Tunisia and Libya which had been tense since the failure of the Union between the two countries in 1974.
