= Tunisian Army =

Branch of Tunisia's military

- جيش البر التونسي
- Seal of the Tunisian Land Army
- Founded: 1831
- Country: Tunisia
- Size: 90,000 active personnel and 60,000 reserves (estimation)
- Part of: Tunisian Armed Forces
- HQ: Tunis
- Nickname: TAF
- Engagements: French conquest of Tunisia; Bizerte Crisis; Yom Kippur War; 1980 Gafsa Uprising; Libyan civil war (2011); Battle of Wazzin; Chaambi Operations; Battle of Ben Guerdane

Commanders
- Commander: General Mohamed El Ghoul

The Tunisian Land Army (Arabic: جيش البر التونسي, romanized: Jaîsh el-Barr et'Tunsi, French: Armée de terre tunisienne) is the ground component of the Tunisian Armed Forces . The Land Forces Command is located in Bizerte. The TAF itself was created on June 30, 1956.

The Land Army is the largest service branch within the Tunisian Armed Forces and has a dominant presence in the current General Staff. It is estimated to number around 90,000, in addition to 60,000 reservists for a total of 150,000 strong.

The modern army was created in the 1830s. It has seen substantive combat on one occasion: against France during the 1961 Bizerte crisis. The mission of the Tunisian army is to defend the country against any foreign attack, to allow the development of a diplomatic counterattack and encourage the involvement of the United Nations, protect Tunisian nationals around the world and participate in peacekeeping missions.

== History ==
=== During the Beylical period ===
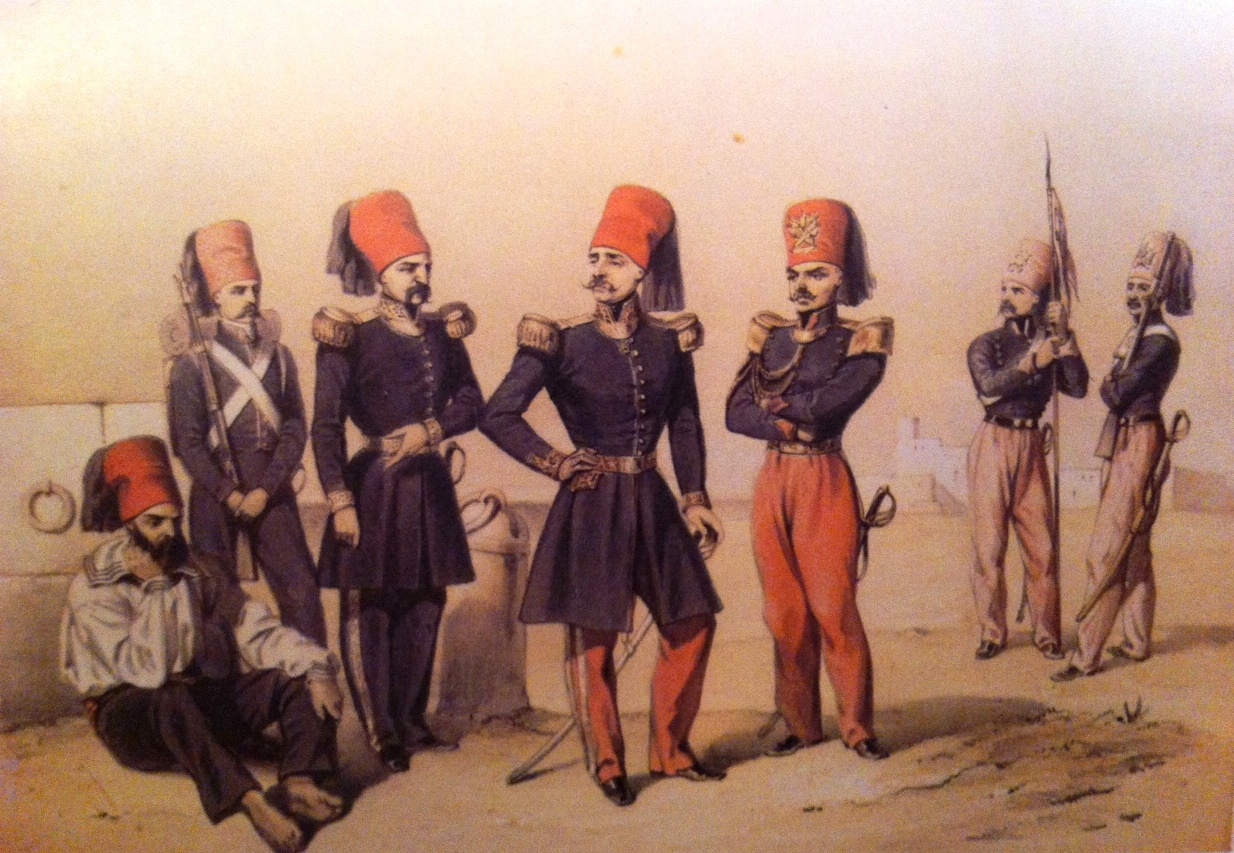
Tunisian infantry officers and soldiers in 1840

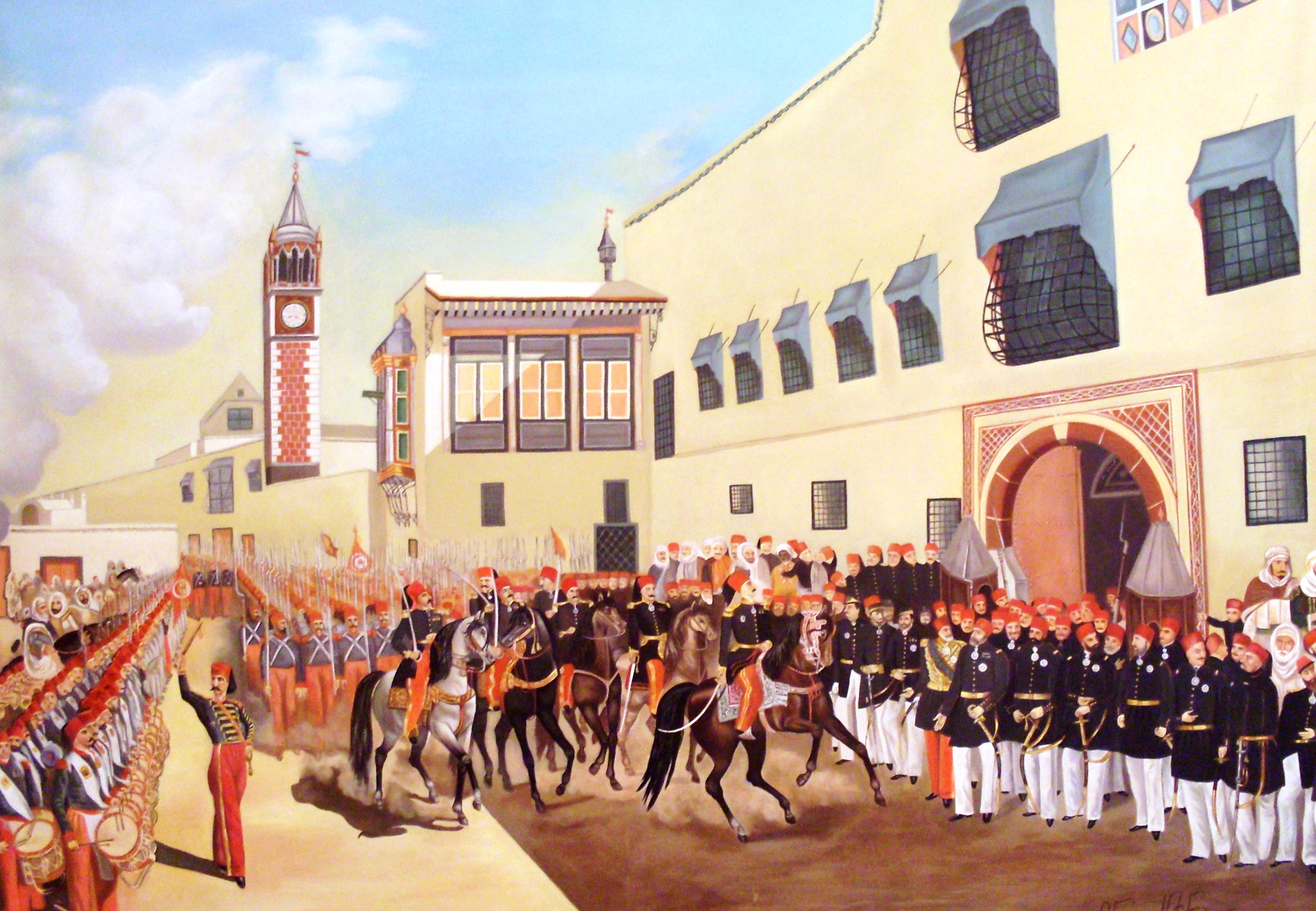
Military parade of the Tunisian Crimean War contingent (1855), under the command of generals Rechid, Mohamed Chaouch and Osman

The modern Tunisian army was formed in 1831 by Al-Husayn II ibn Mahmud.

The first battalions of the regular modern Tunisian army were created at the same time as the reform of the Ottoman army and after the French conquest of Algeria in 1830.

At the initiative of Minister of Hussein Bey II, Mamluk Shakir Saheb Ettabaâ, a battalion of Tunisian infantry was established in Tunis in January 1831. The next year, another battalion was raised, composed mainly of Sahelians and based in Sousse. Soldiers and officers were trained, equipped and dressed in European fashion, like the first regiments of the Ottoman army after the reforms of Sultan Mahmud II which followed the removal of the Janissary Corps.

Ahmed Bey I built on the initial reforms of the reign of his uncle, Hussein Bey II and initiated more extensive changes in both the Tunisian army and state. The former changes included the raising of Tunisia's first regular cavalry regiment in 1838, the opening of a military academy in 1840 and the creation of four conscript based regiments of infantry by 1842. Four artillery units were organised between 1838 and 1847, to be brigaded with the conscripted infantry.

==== Early structure ====
By 1855 the Tunisian army was divided into 7 infantry brigades spread throughout the country as listed below. Each was under the command of an Amir Liwa (Brigadier-General). From 1864 an Amir Oumar (General of Division was appointed). The numbers of each brigade varies from 1 000 to 2 000 men at different times.

- 1st brigade permanently stationed in Tunis since 1831;
- 2nd Brigade based in Sousse since 1832;
- 3rd Brigade based in Monastir;
- 4th Brigade based in Kairouan;
- 5th Brigade: formed part of the mhalla (a bi-annual mobile military column that was deployed through the back country of Tunisia);
- 6th Brigade : formed part of the mhalla;
- 7th Brigade based in El Ghar Melh (Porto Farina).

Also available from 1835 to 1860 were 4 artillery brigades (topjiya) of 1000 men each, distributed as follows:

- 1st Brigade in Tunis and Bardo since 1831;
- 2nd Brigade at La Goulette;
- 3rd Brigade distributed in the forts of the country (mainly Bizerte, Monastir, Sfax, Sousse Tabarka);
- 4th Brigade distributed in the high country.

The Army also had several Tunisian irregular regiments made up of Berber tribal levies (or Zouaoua mkhaznia) spread across the country. The full strength of these irregular units reached up to 40,000 infantry and cavalry. They were based mainly in barracks at Kef, Nefza and Tunis, and were commanded by Turkish Mamluks. When the need for a regular cavalry regiment (spahis) arose, Ahmed Bey I created one regiment in 1850, based in Manouba.

==== Fortifications ====
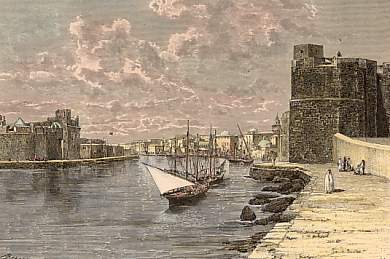
Fort of Bizerte

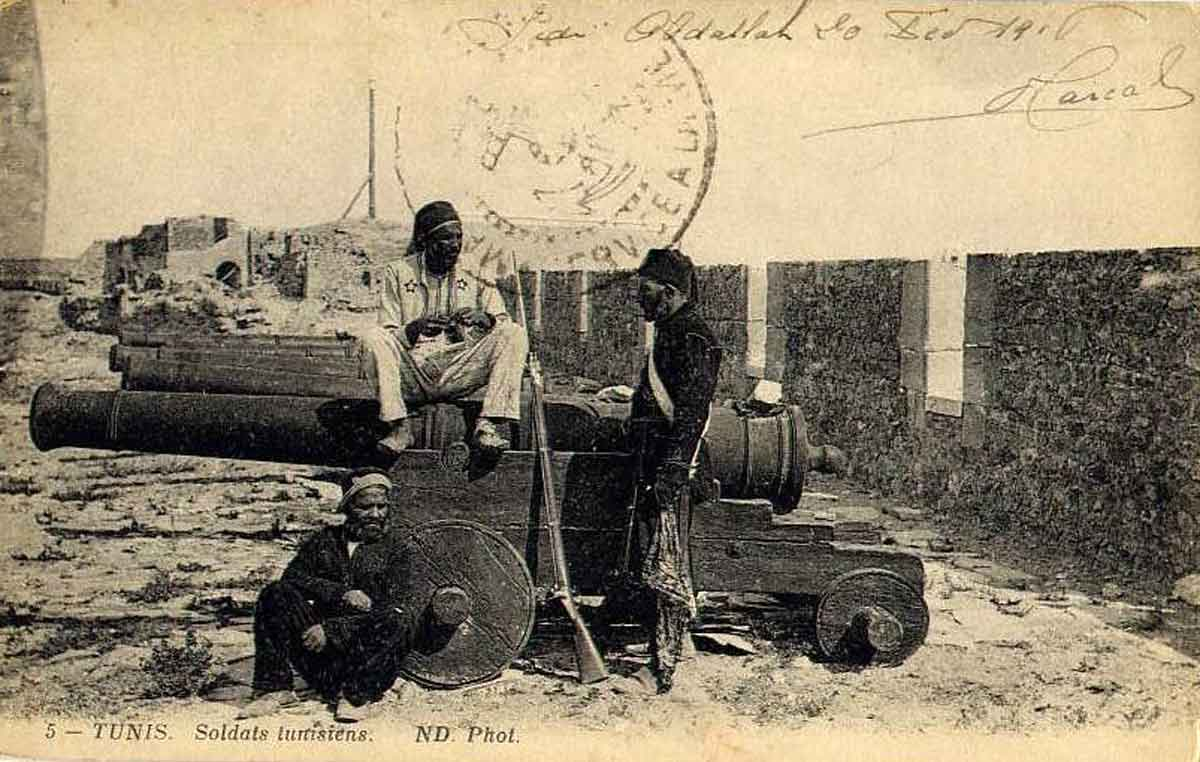
Beylical artillery in 1900

The country was surrounded by 110 fortresses garrisoned by detachments ranging in strength from 50 to 200 men. These comprised infantry and some artillery. They were responsible for ensuring the safety of cities, borders and coasts, the latter under the authority of the Ministry of the Navy. These forts were also used as residences by senior officials and governors, as well as serving as prisons or granaries and depots for military supplies such as gunpowder and ammunition. Every city and large village had one of these forts.

- Tunis (14 from the largest in the country) Borj Flifel, El Rabta, Gorjani, Bab Saadoun and Sidi Abdesselam
- Bardo (8) Borj El Kebir and Manouba
- La Goulette Borj Chikly, Sidi Bou Saïd and Halk El Oued
- Ghar El Melh (3)
- Bizerte (4) The Kasbah
- Le Kef (16) Borj El Jdid et Asker El Nidhami
- Sousse (13) Borj Sidi Mahjoub
- Mahdia (2)
- Monastir (10) Borj Sidi Amar
- Kairouan (7) Borj Dahmani
- Sfax (12) Borj El Tabenna et El Rassas
- Djerba (6) Borj El Kebir
- Tabarka (2) Borj El Jazira
- El Hamma
- Gabès
- Zarzis
- Béja
- Kélibia
- Hammamet
- Gafsa
- Sidi Daoud
- El Haouaria

The Kasbah of Tunis, fortress and former residence of the Bey of Tunis, had a special status. Inherited from the Hafsid period, it was refurbished and enlarged by the Ottomans becoming their center of power. It could accommodate up to 4,000 Ottoman troops together with their weapons and equipment. It also housed the apartments of the Dey and senior officials of the Turkish troops from Tunis plus some departments of the Chancery. It was transformed into barracks by the French troops during the Protectorate and razed after Tunisian Independence.

==== Military Industries ====
Hammouda Pacha Bey was the first leader to give the country a military industry; with the creation of a modern cannon foundry in 1810; at Hafsia in the heart of the Medina of Tunis. The foundry was small but provided most of the guns required for Tunisia's small navy guns and proved quite effective according to the commentators of the time. However, to ensure the provision of equipment for the new Tunisian army, Ahmed Bey I provided the country with more modern factories on the European model from about 1840:

- a clothing factory in Tebourba which employed 400 workers. These included 48 skilled engineers of whom four were French. It used machines imported from England, under the authority of H.H. Prince (Amir) Mahmoud Ben Ayad of Djerba.
- two tanneries in Mohamedia within the walls of the Kasbah, employing which workers from the Tunisian handicraft industry;
- a second cannon foundry located on the Bardo road, in addition to that of the existing Hafsia plant with its European machinery. The two factories provided the guns required for a fully equipped artillery regiment, without the need to import any parts;
- a factory of small arms in the barracks of Sidi Ismail in Tunis, where craftsmen work Tunisian corporations even if the quantities produced and the quality of guns are weak;
- several saltpeter mines operating in Gafsa supplying Téboursouk and Béja;
- two gunpowder plants in the Kasbah of Tunis and El Jem;
- a large modern flour mill located in Djedeida to ensure the food needs of the military in Dabdaba, near the Kasbah of Tunis. This complex included a bakery and an oil mill with hydraulic presses.

Around 1865 many of these plants were dismantled or abandoned during a financial crisis.

==== Instruction ====
In 1840 a military school called the Ecole Polytechnique was established in the Bardo Palace . Several instructors were French and Italians teaching science and military technology. The school staff also included several professors from the Zitouna University. The reformer Mahmoud Kabadou taught Arabic. The school was closed in the aftermath of the Mejba revolt in 1864, for financial reasons.

=== During the French occupation ===
During the period of the French Protectorate (1881-1956), Tunisians were recruited in significant numbers into the French Army, serving as tirailleurs (infantry) and spahis (cavalry). These units saw active service in Europe during both World Wars, as well as in Indo-China prior to 1954. The only exclusively Tunisian military force in existence under the French administration was the Beylical Guard.

=== After Tunisian Independence ===
On 21 June 1956 the transfer of about 9,500 Tunisian soldiers who had served in the French army and the Beylical Guard, made possible the speedy establishment of a combined arms regiment. The necessary equipment was made available to the young state from French and other sources. Of this number 25 officers, 250 warrant officers and 1,250 soldiers were veterans of the French army. On 30 June 1956 the new national Tunisian army was officially established by decree. The integration of the Beylical Guard, the induction of conscripts performing their military service as mandated in January 1957, and the recall of reservists enabled the army to expand from three to twelve battalions numbering 20,000 men in 1960. Approximately 60% of forces were used for border patrol and surveillance duties. The Tunisian army experienced combat for the first time in 1958; against French units crossing the southern border in pursuit of Algerian FLN fighters. However, the main battle experience of the Tunisian army, since its creation, occurred during the Bizerte crisis, when over 600 Tunisian soldiers were killed in combat against French forces.

Tunisia has contributed military forces to United Nations peacekeeping missions, including an army company to UNAMIR during the Rwandan Genocide. In his book Shake Hands with the Devil, Canadian force commander Roméo Dallaire gave the Tunisian soldiers high credit for their work and effort in the conflict and referred to them as his "ace in the hole". From 1960 the Tunisian army has participated in the following missions:

- Congo (1960–1963): 2,261 troops (1,100 from 1962) involved the replacement of the Belgian colonial army;
- Ethiopia-Eritrea (1977–1978);
- Western Sahara (1991–1997): 9 officers go there as observers of the cease-fire between Morocco and the Polisario Front;
- Cambodia (1992–1993): a contingent of 850 men participating in the disarmament of armed groups, protect refugees and treats more than 10,000 Cambodians. Sixty more men involved in the UN mission in that country;
- Somalia (1993–1994): soldiers provide security for UN facilities while doctors provide care to the population;
- Rwanda (1993–1995): 60 men are part of the African observers at the beginning of the Civil War. In 1994, a contingent of 826 soldiers deployed to the northwest of the country; In his written account of the Rwandan Genocide; Shake hands with the devil, Canadian General Romeo Dallaire gave the Tunisian UNAMIR-contingent extensive credit for their skills and efforts in the conflict, referring to them as his "ace in the hole".
- Burundi (1994);
- Haiti (1994–1995);
- Namibia (1994–1997);
- Comoros (1997–1998);
- Kosovo (1999);
- Democratic Republic of Congo (2000 -): 27 officers working there as observers and more than 200 soldiers provide security of the headquarters of UN command and personalities on the ground.

1,545 Tunisian soldiers have received United Nations medals for serving a minimum of 90 days as members of one or another United Nations peacekeeping missions.

During the 2011 Libyan Civil War, Tunisian forces, mostly border guards, saw some limited action when fighting between Libyan rebels and loyalist soldiers spilled over the border and clashes ensued between the Libyan Army and the Tunisian Army, resulting in at least one Tunisian civilian being injured by a Libyan rocket.

In October 2016, a British Short Term Training Team of 40 troops provided operational planning, intelligence, surveillance, and patrolling training to about 200 Tunisian personnel of the Tunisian 1st Infantry Brigade, to help Tunisia to better guard their land borders. The training, provided under the auspices of the 4th Infantry Brigade (United Kingdom), involved theoretical and practical exercises.

== Army command and organisation ==
Following the Tunisian Revolution, the army strength increased up to 90,000 men in order to face the new security challenges. However the organisation remains mainly the same compared to the pre-revolution one. Most noticed change is the adding of an Intervention Battalion in each of the three mechanized infantry Brigade. These new battalions mostly focused on anti-terror fighting was seen during 61st army anniversary parade.

Main Tunisian Army formations are as follows :

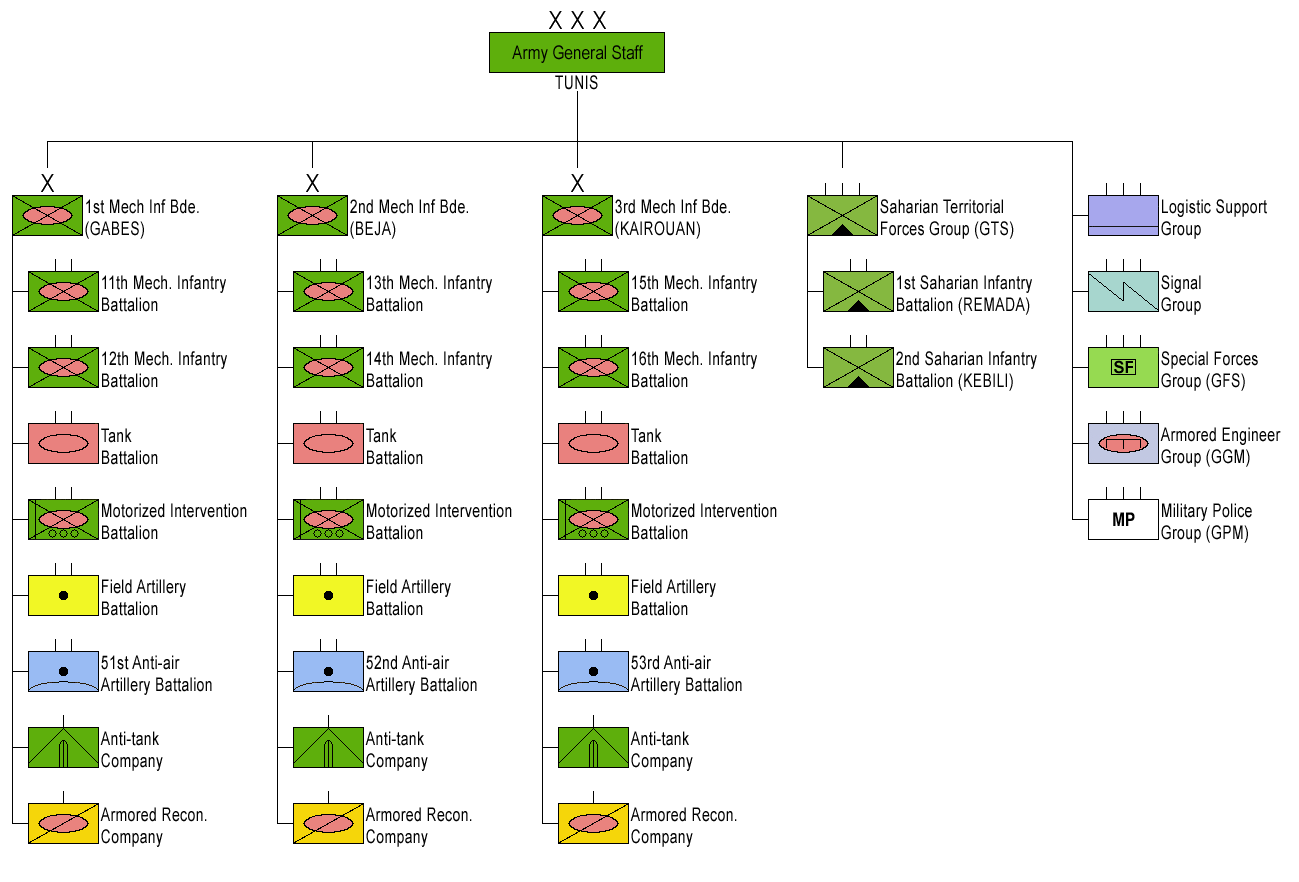
Structure of the Tunisian Army 2020

- 1st Mechanized Infantry Brigade (Gabès, South)
  - 11th Mechanized infantry battalion
  - 12th Mechanized infantry battalion
  - Tank battalion
  - Intervention battalion
  - Field artillery battalion
  - 51st Anti-air Artillery battalion
  - Reconnaissance company
  - Anti-tank company
- 2nd Mechanized Infantry Brigade (Béja, North)
  - 13th Mechanized infantry battalion
  - 14th Mechanized infantry battalion
  - Tank battalion
  - Intervention battalion
  - Field artillery battalion
  - 52nd Anti-air Artillery battalion
  - Reconnaissance company
  - Anti-tank company
- 3rd Mechanized Infantry Brigade (Kairouan, Center)
  - 15th Mechanized infantry battalion
  - 16th Mechanized infantry battalion
  - Tank battalion
  - Intervention battalion
  - Field artillery battalion
  - 53rd Anti-air Artillery battalion
  - Reconnaissance company
  - Anti-tank company
- Saharian Territory Forces Group
- Special Forces Group
- Police Military Group
- Engineer Group
- Signal Group
- Logistic Support Group

== Ranks ==
The Tunisian Army is composed of the corps of officers, NCOs and other ranks.

Officer ranks

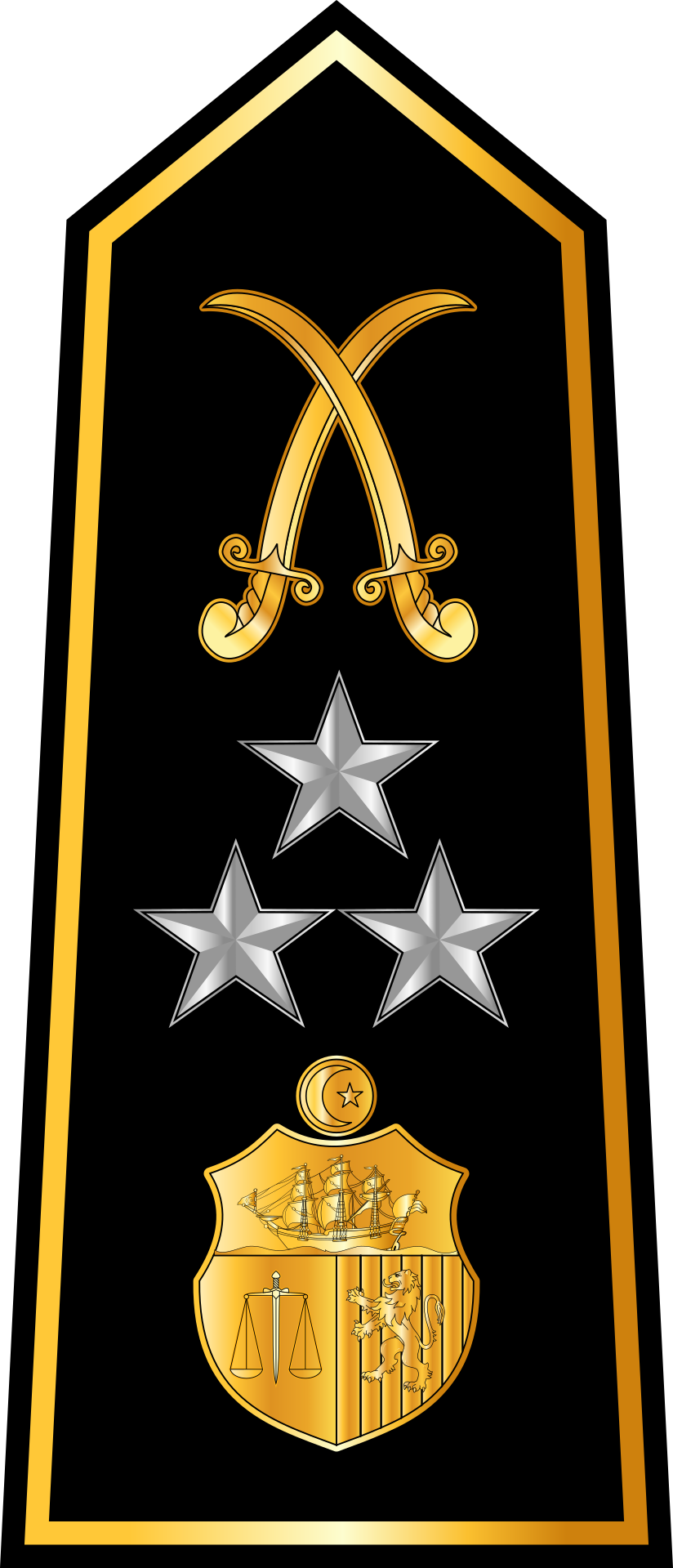
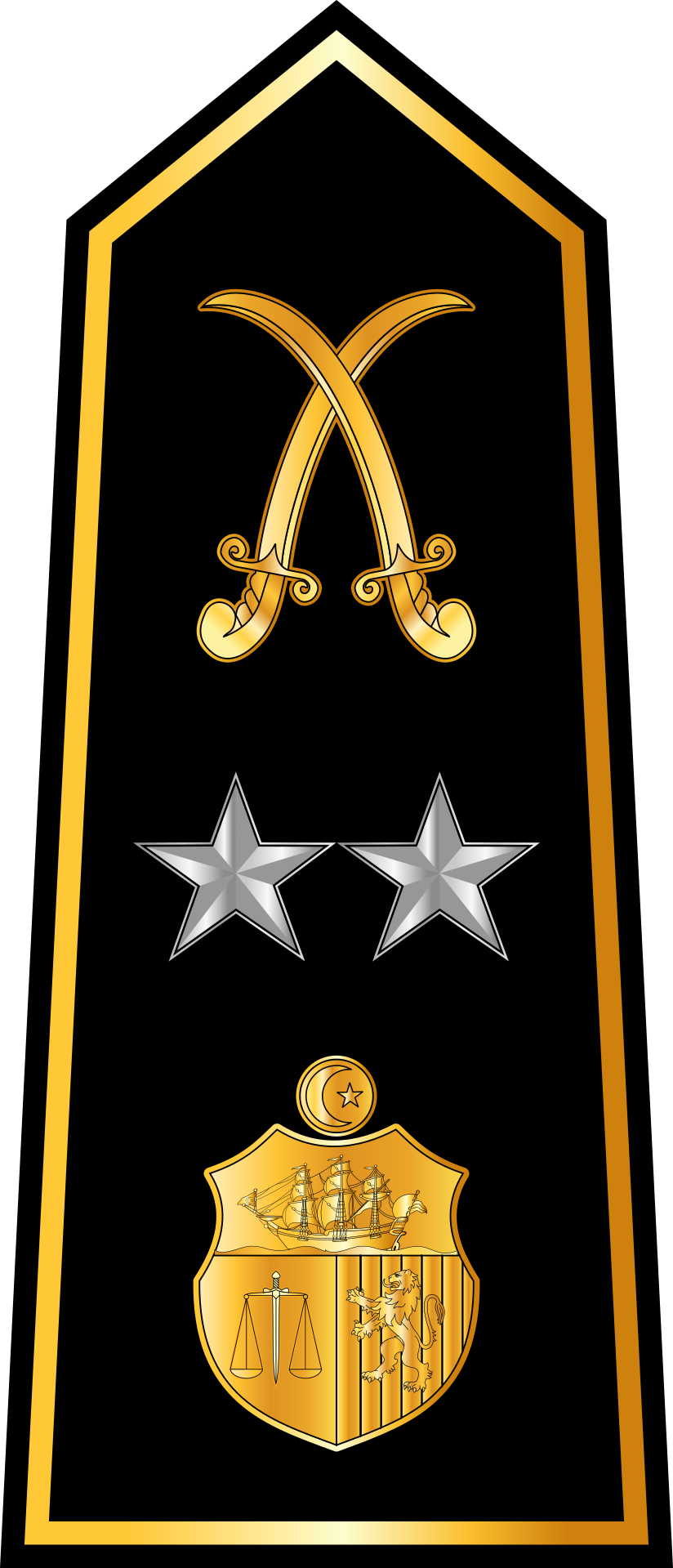
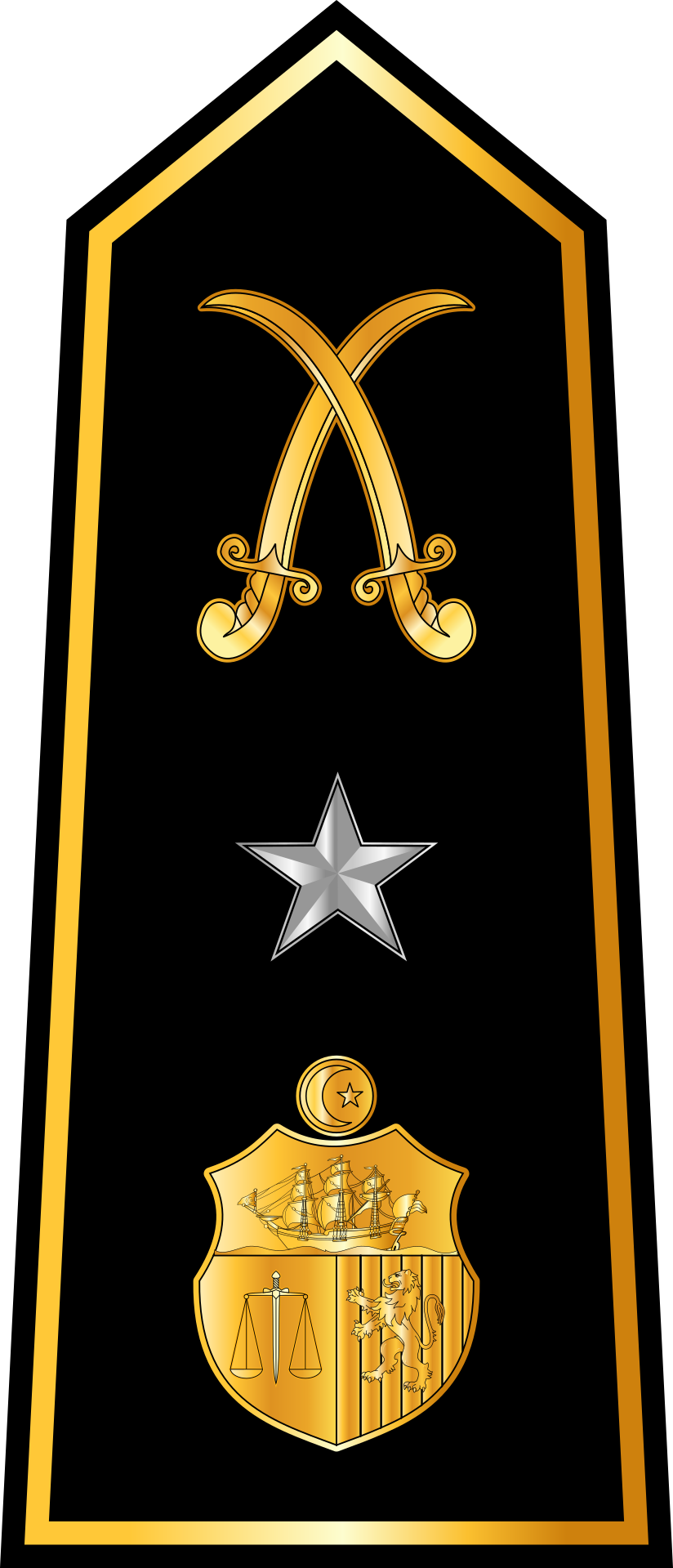
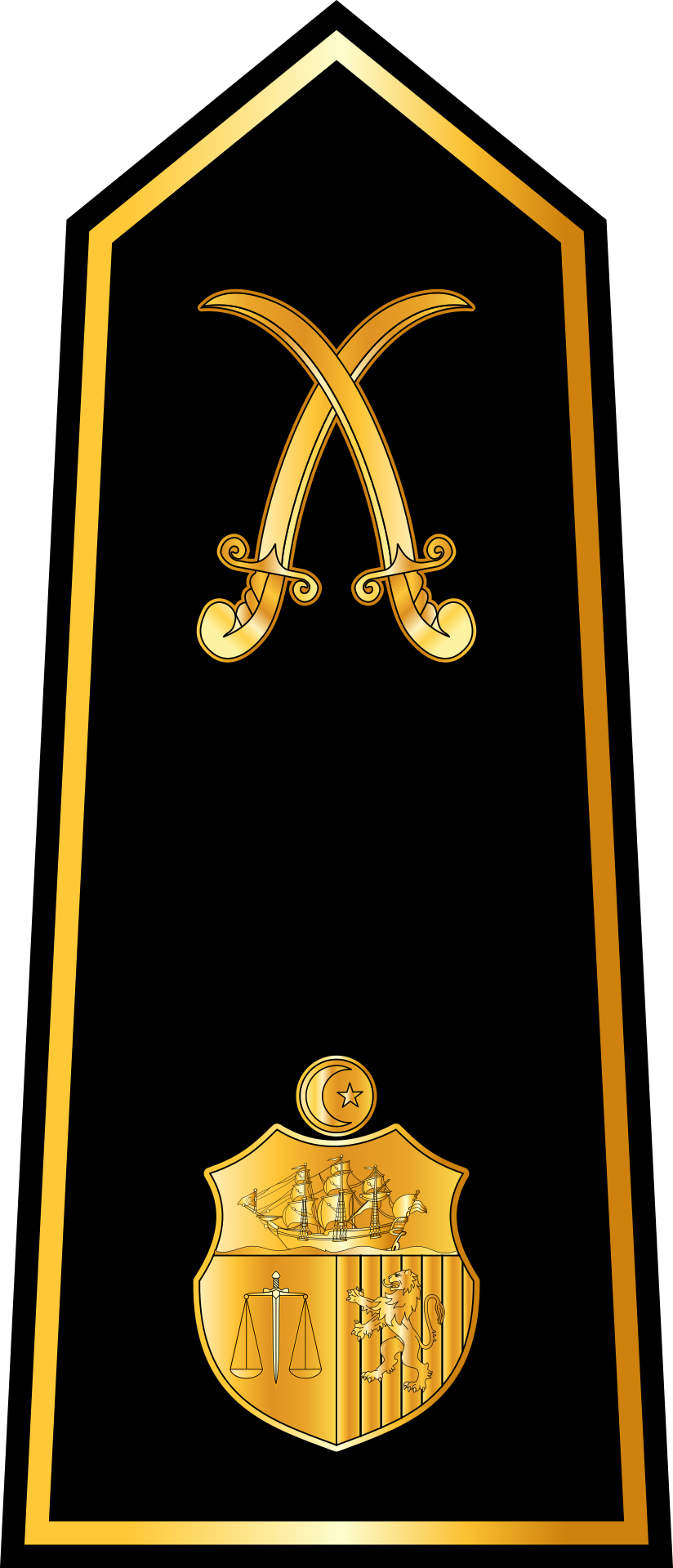
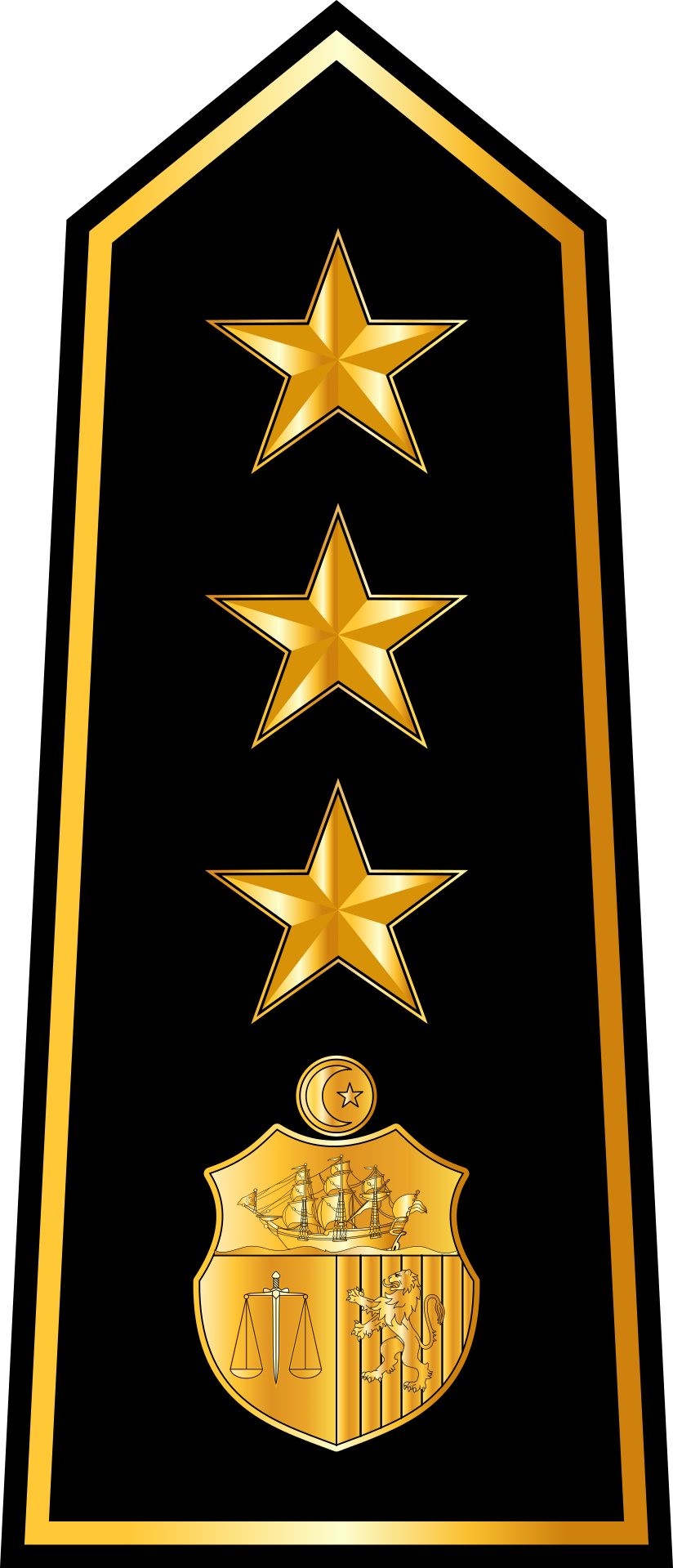
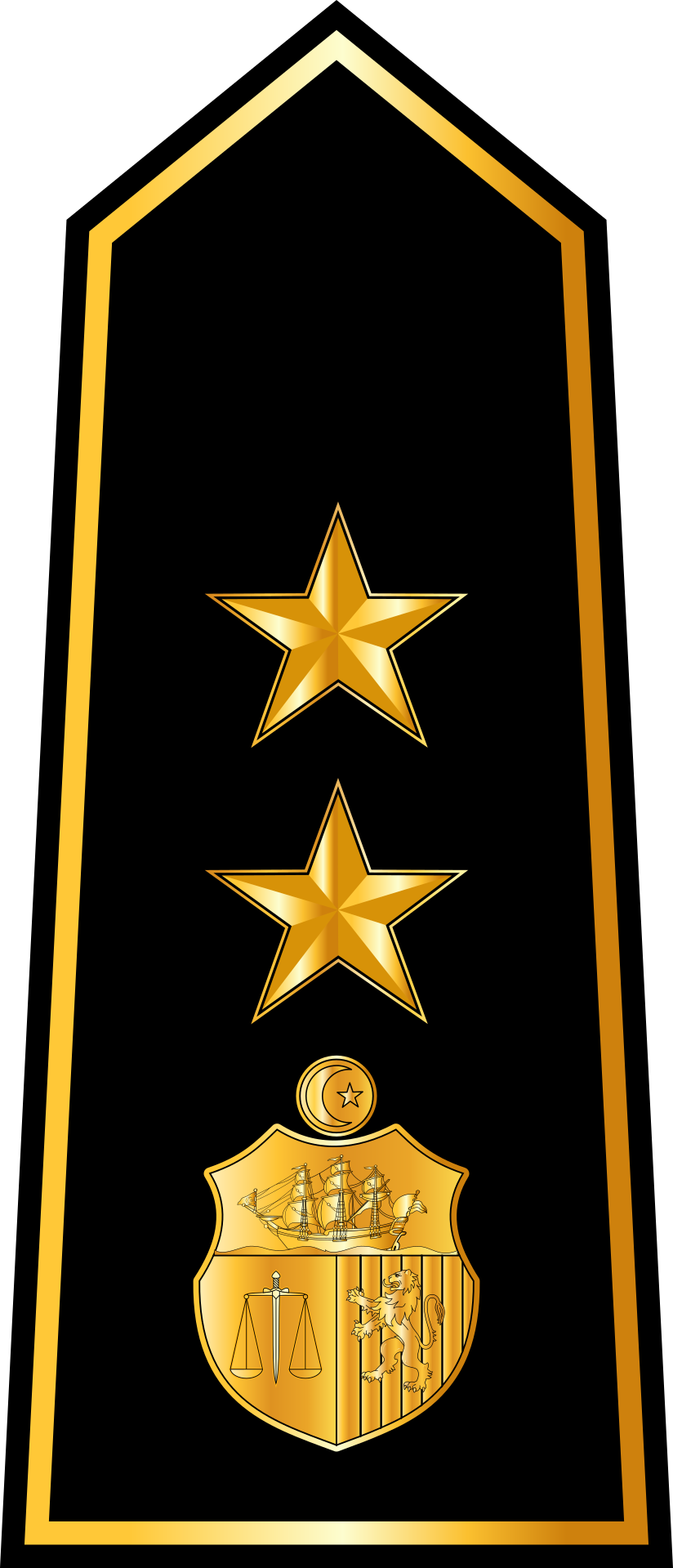
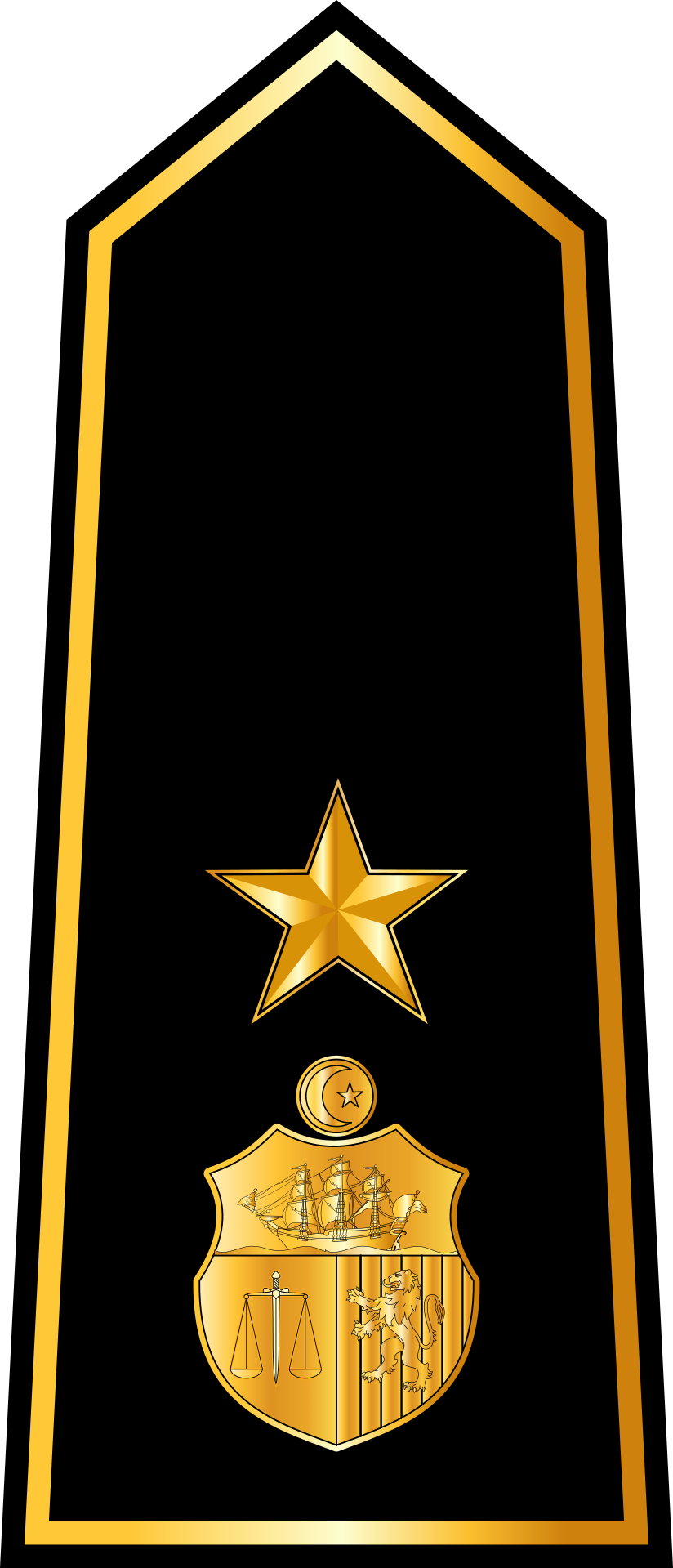
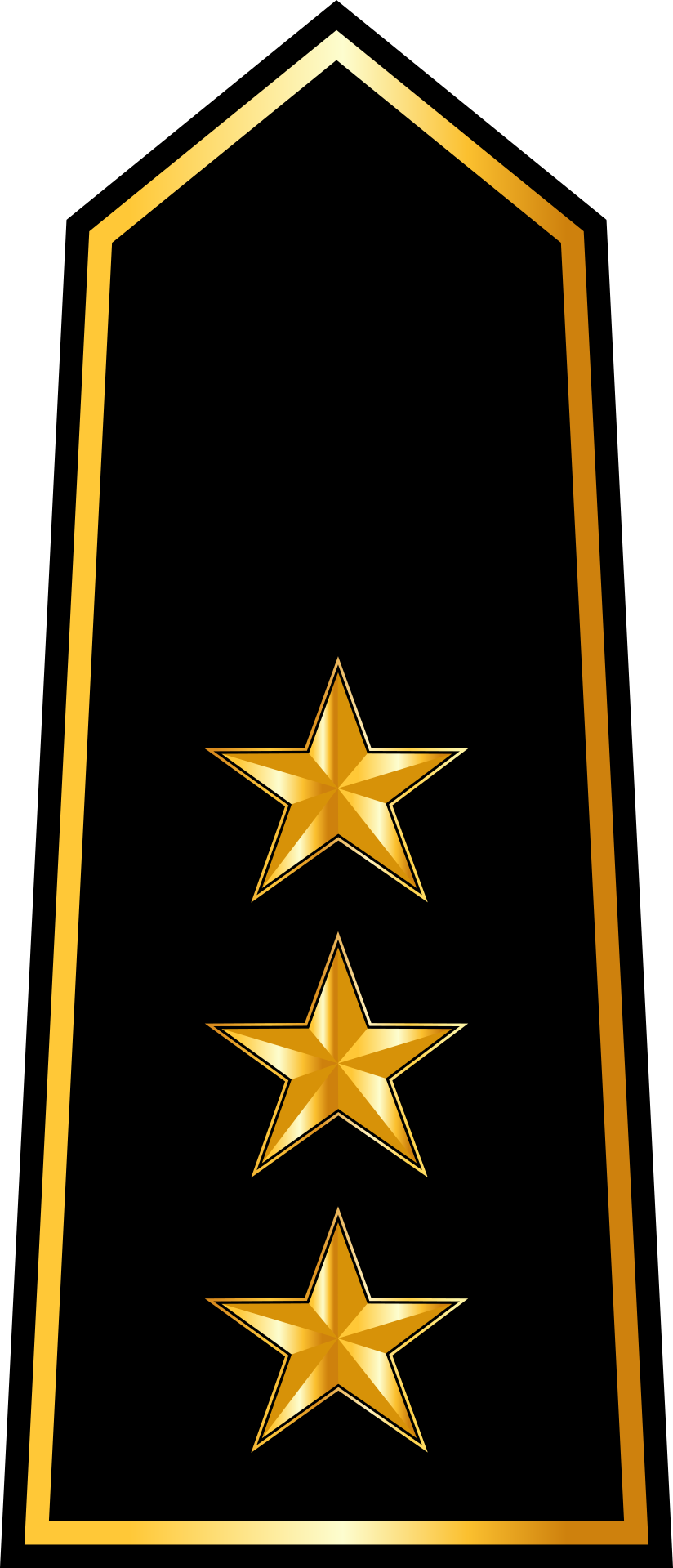
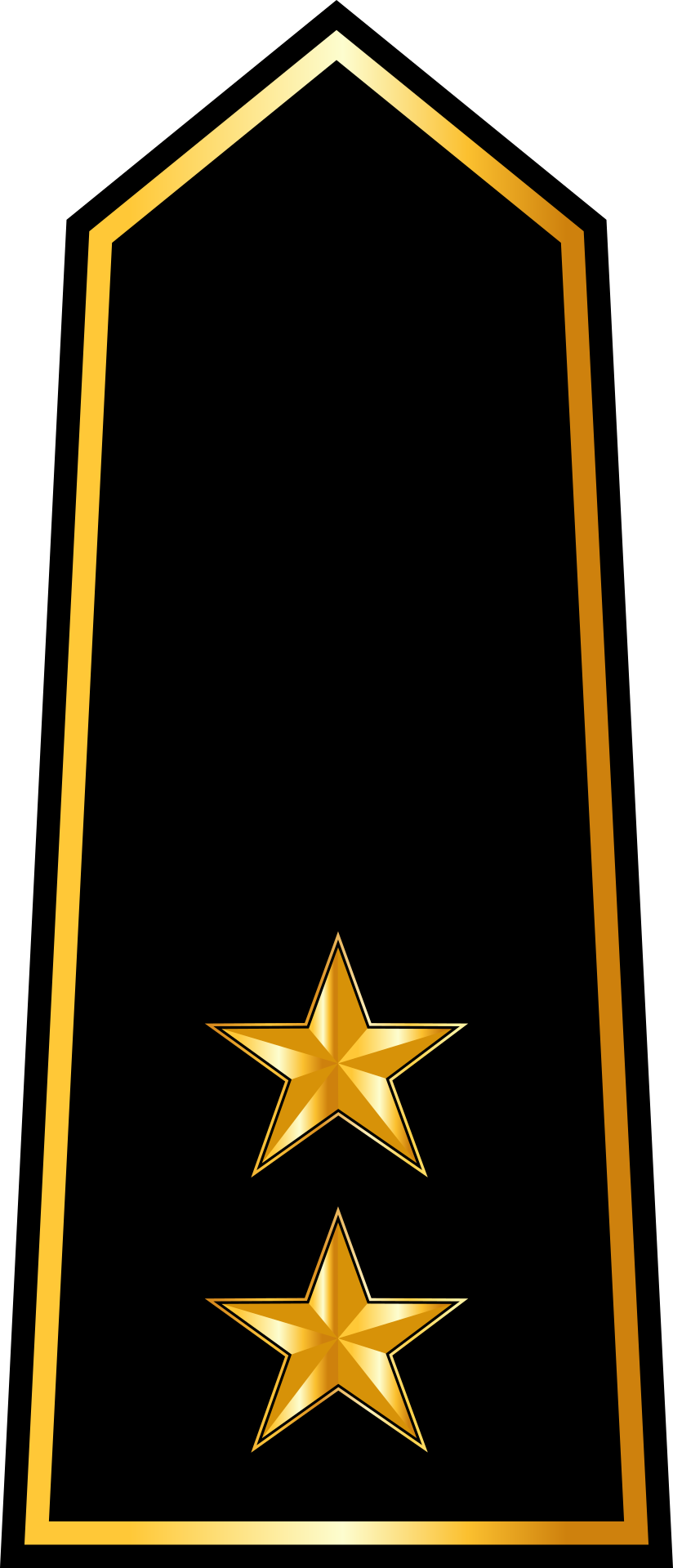
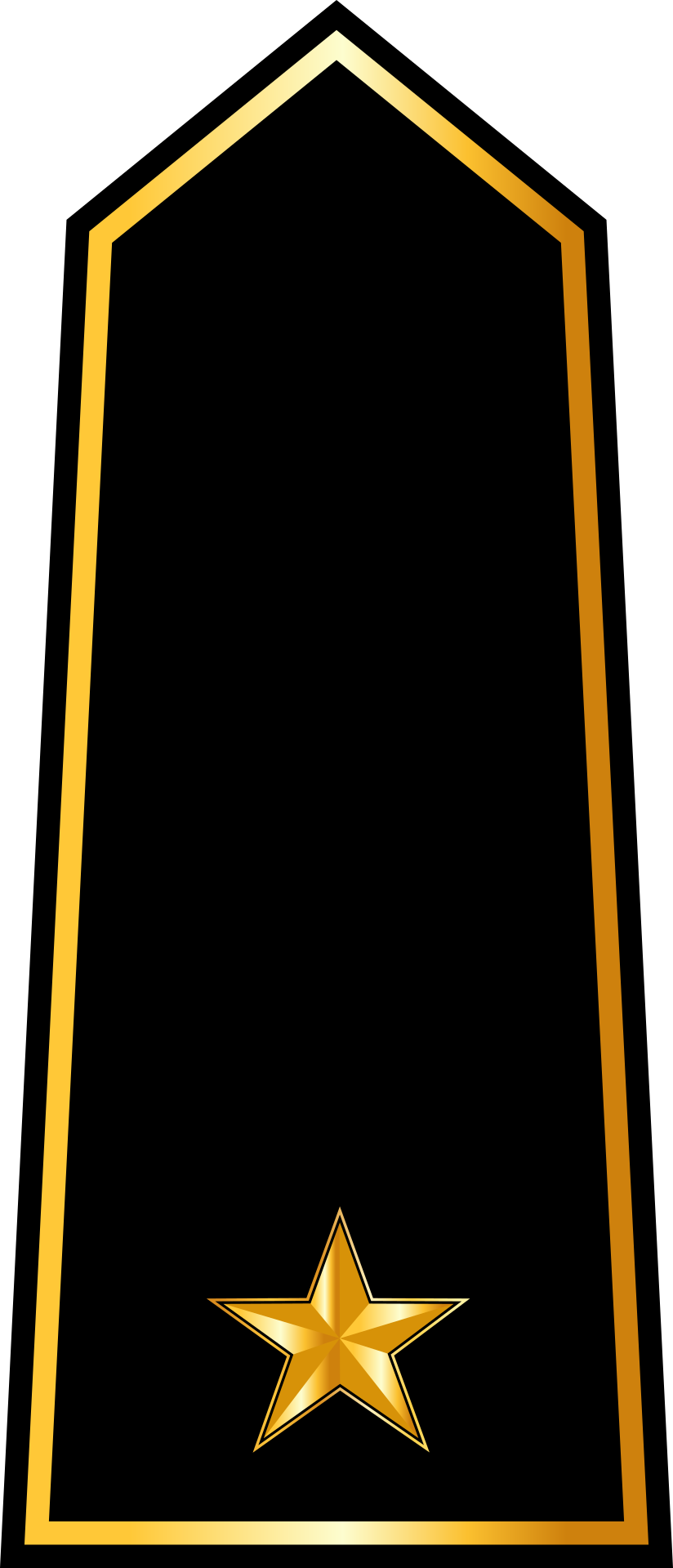
Rank group	General / flag officers			Senior officers				Junior officers
Tunisian Army
Tunisian Army	فريق أول; Fariq 'awal	فريق; Fariq	أمير لواء 'amir liwa'	عميد; Amid	عقيد; Aqid	مقدم; Muqaddam	رائد; Ra'id	نقيب; Naqib	ملازم أول; Mulazim awwal	ملازم; Mulazim
Tunisian Army	Général de corps d'armée	Général de division	Général de brigade	Colonel-major	Colonel	Lieutenant-colonel	Commandant	Capitaine	Lieutenant	Sous-lieutenant

Other ranks

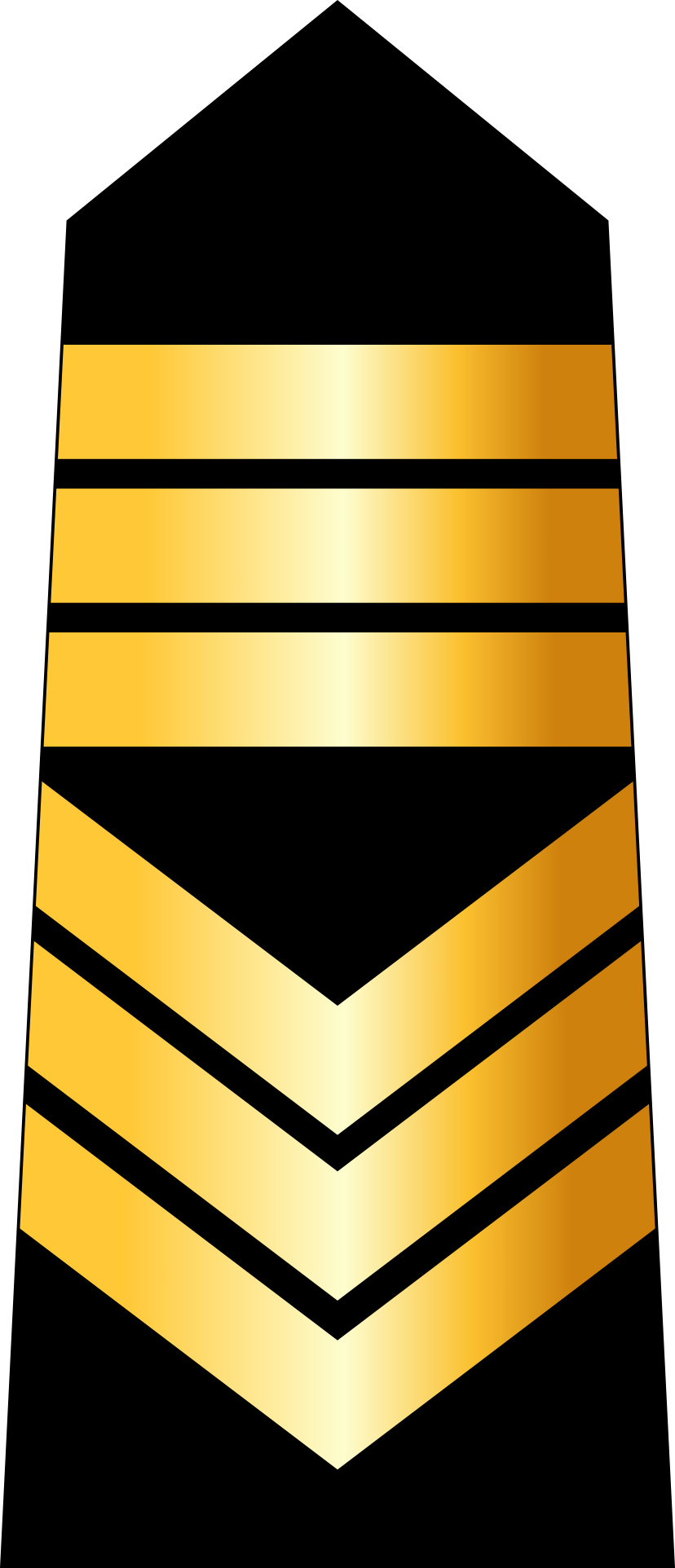
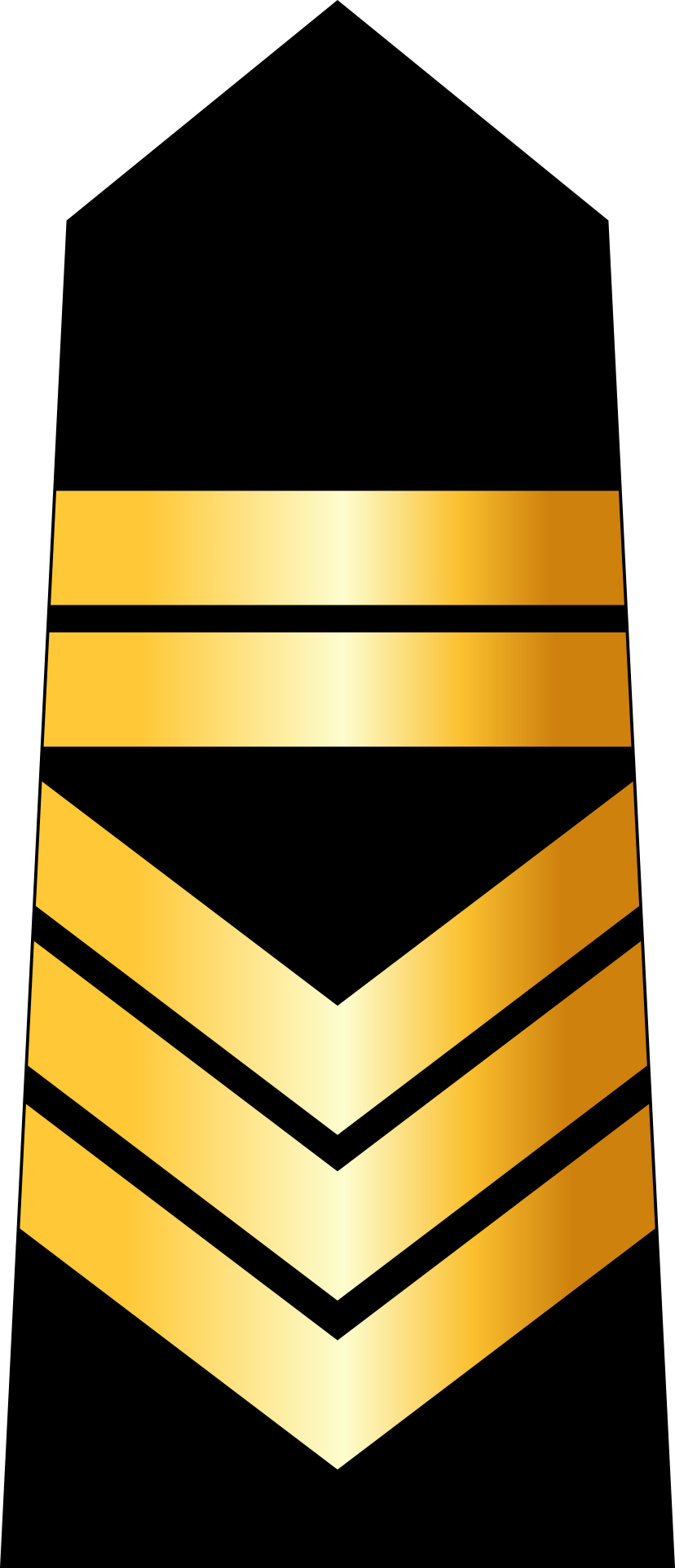
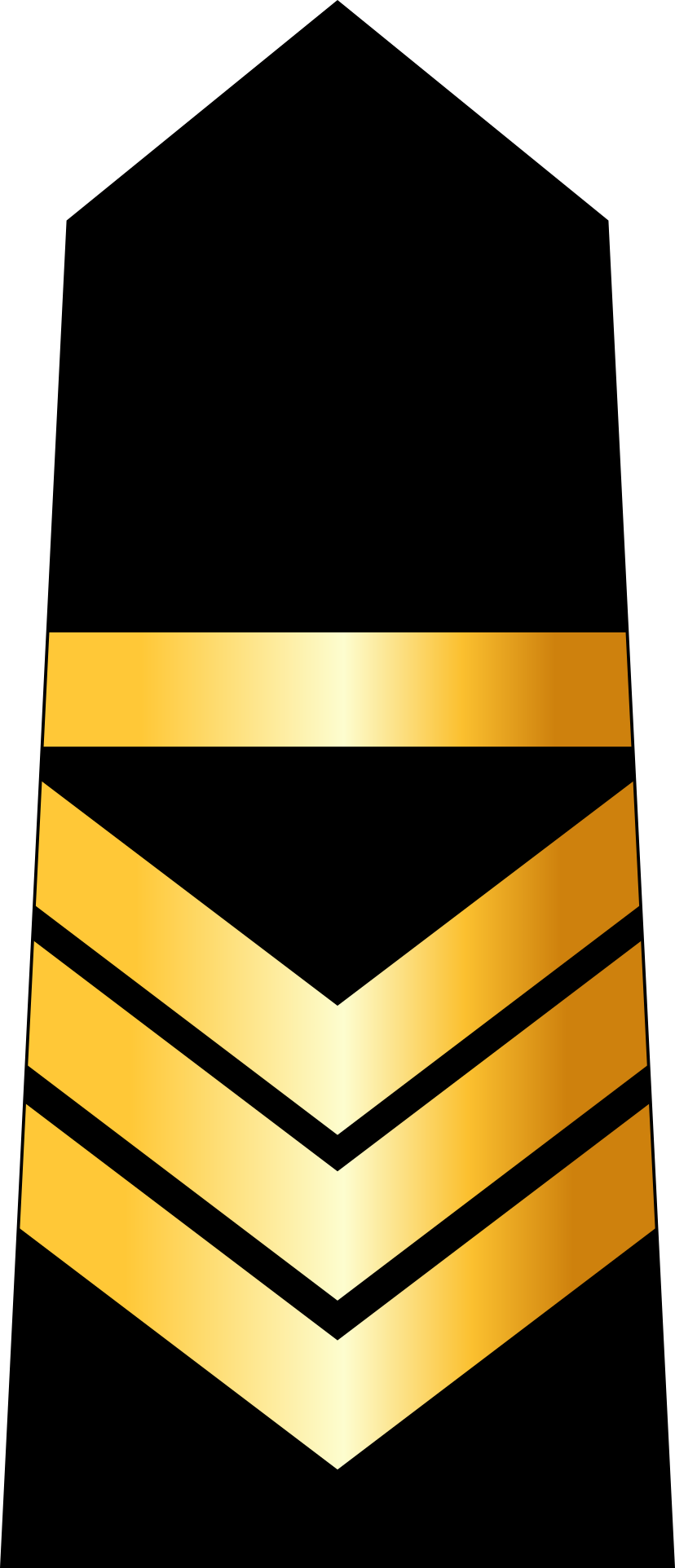
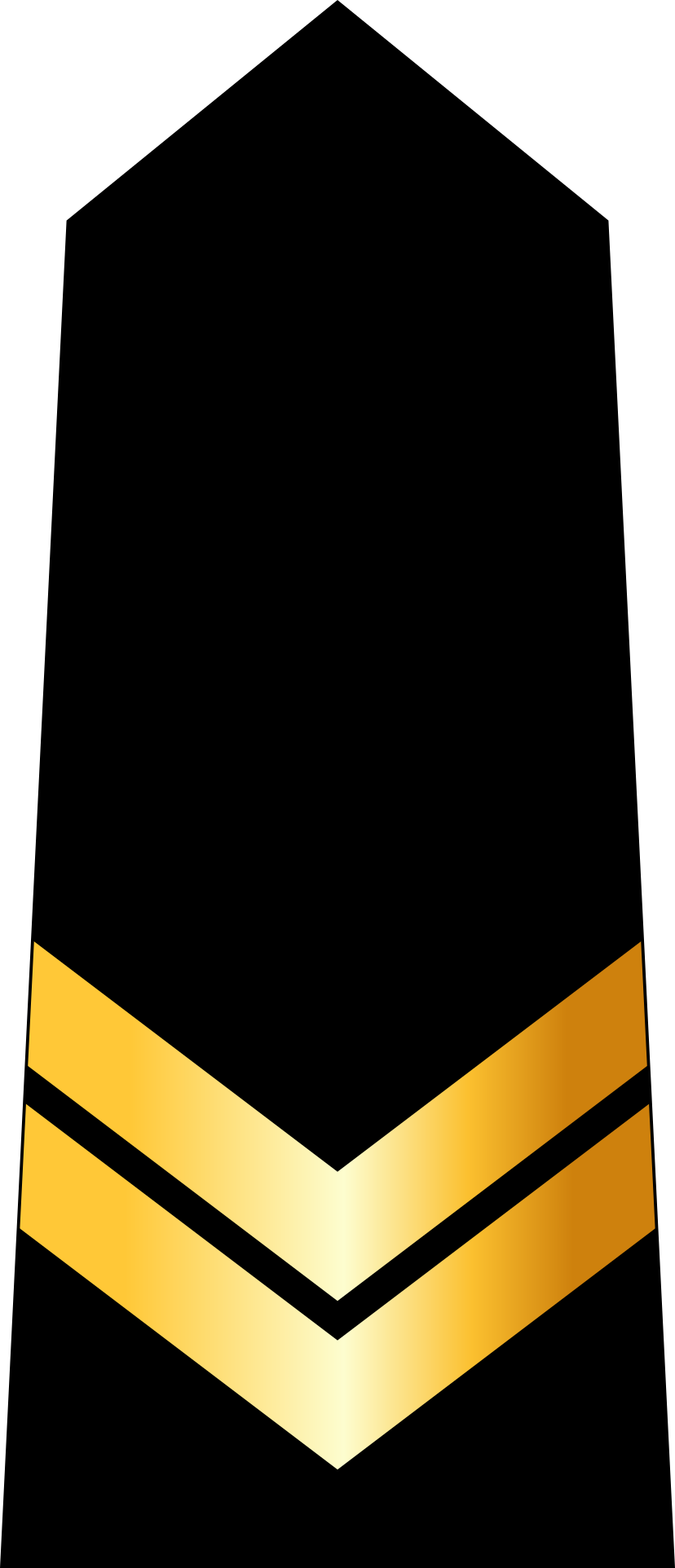
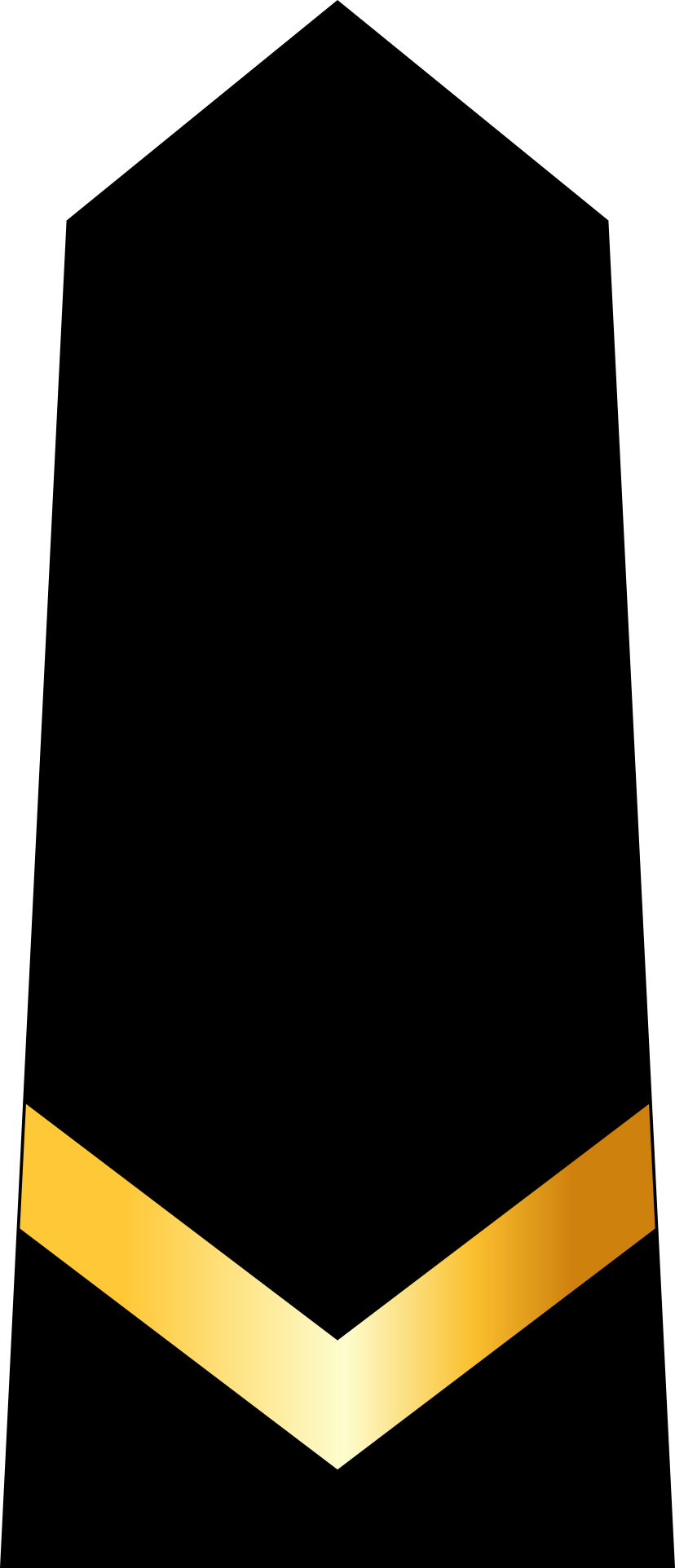
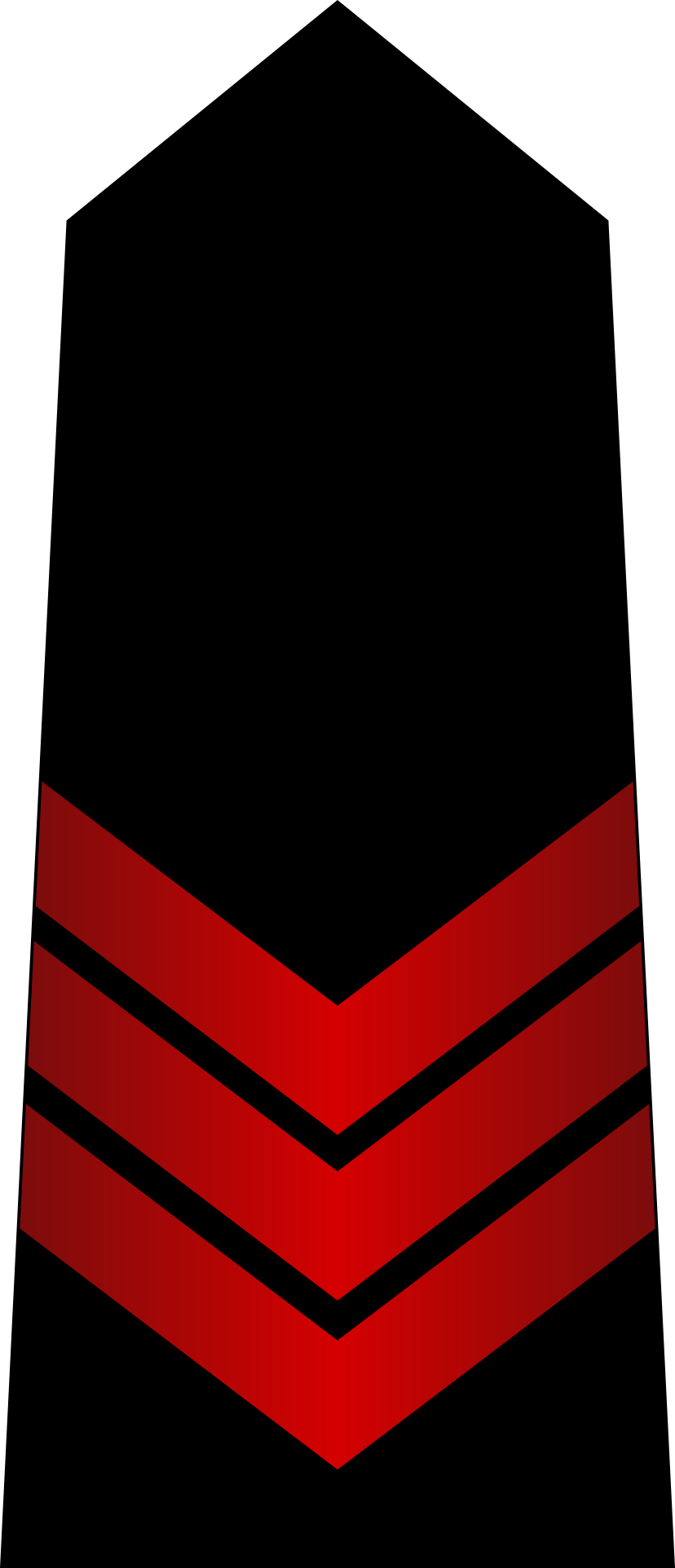
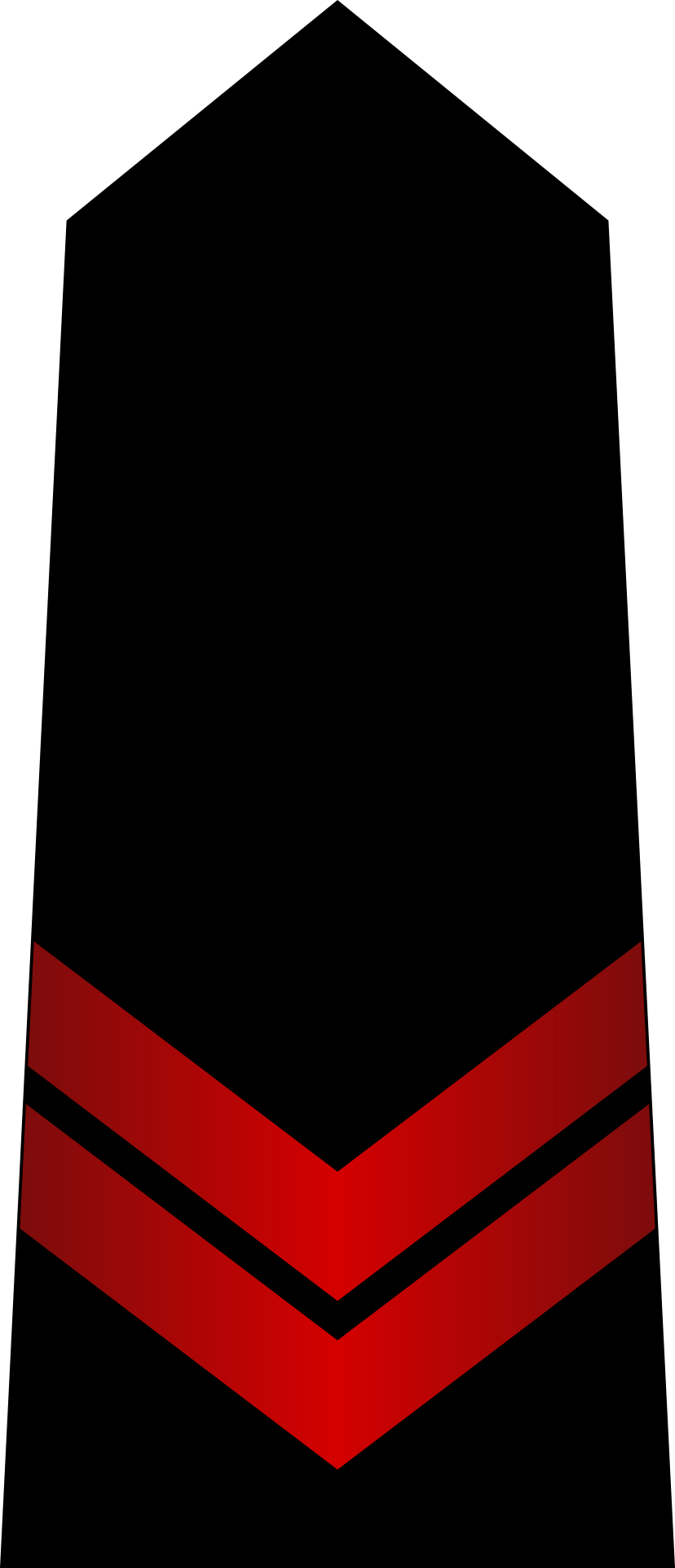
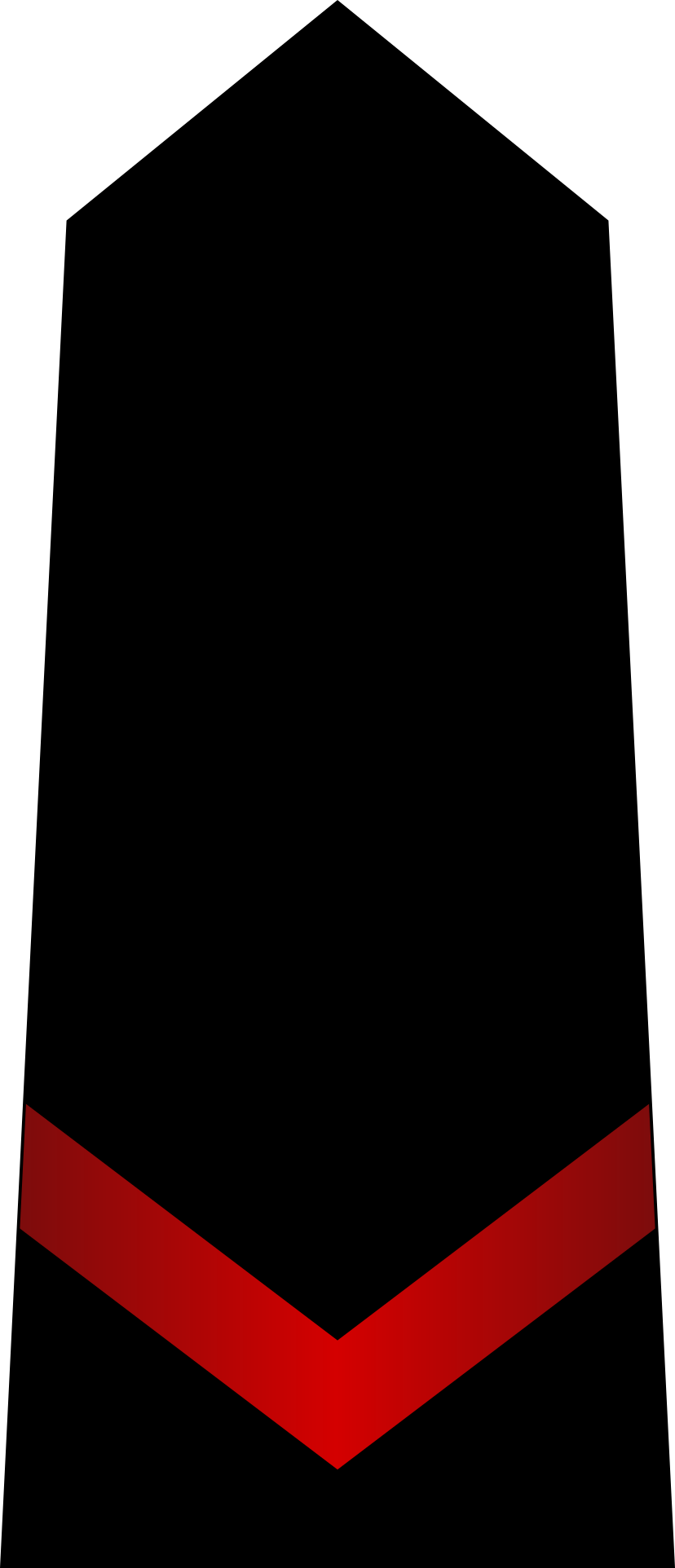
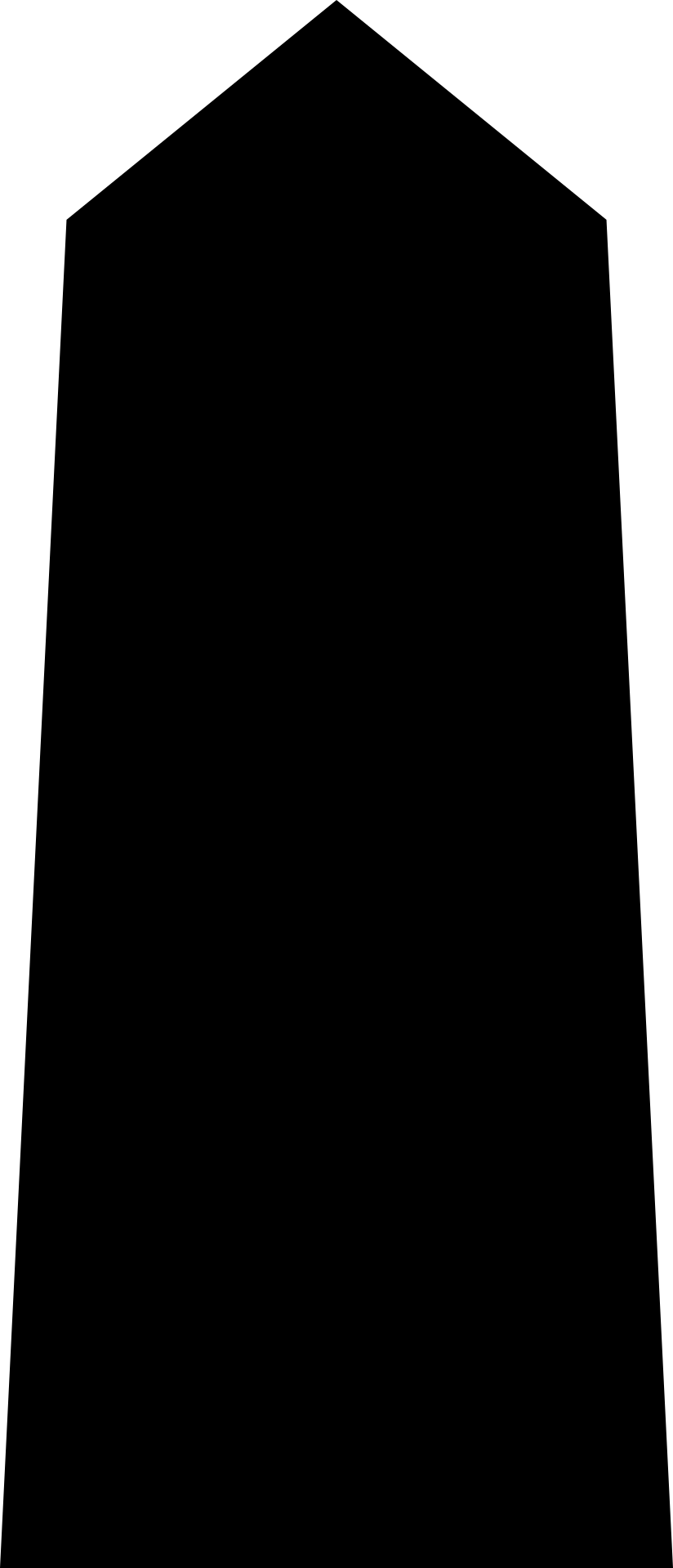
Rank group	Senior NCOs					Junior NCOs		Enlisted
Tunisian Army
Tunisian Army	وكيل أعلى; Wakil 'aelaa	وكيل أول; Wakil 'awal	وكيل; Wakil	عريف أول; Earif 'awal	عريف; Earif	رقيب أول; Raqib 'awal	رقيب; Raqib	جندي أول; Jundiun awwal	جندي متطوع; Jundiun
Tunisian Army	Major	Adjudant-chef	Adjudant	Sergent-chef	Sergent	Caporal-chef	Caporal	Soldat de 1^{re} classe	Soldat
