= Uqba ibn Nafi Brigade =

Tunisian Salafi jihadist organization

- لواء عقبة بن نافع
- Founded: June 2012
- Split from: Al-Qaeda in the Maghreb
- Allegiance: al-Qaeda in the Islamic Maghreb
- Ideology: Jihadism; Salafism

The Uqba ibn Nafi Brigade (Arabic: لواء عقبة بن نافع, romanized: Liwāʼ ʻUqbah ibn Nāfiʻ), also known as Katibat Uqba Bin Nafi, was a Tunisian Salafi jihadist organization named after Uqba ibn Nafi, established in 2012 in order to create a Tunisian jihadist group linked to Al-Qaeda In the Maghreb and later, the Islamic State.

== History ==
After its creation in 2012, the group mainly attacked areas of small Tunisian forces in mountainous regions along the Algerian-Tunisian border, particularly in the Kasserine Governorate, including Djebel Chaambi, Djebel Sammama, Djebel Selloum, and Djebel Mghilla. The group conducted numerous high-profile attacks against Tunisian security forces, resulting in approximately 60 deaths since late 2012. Key incidents include the 2015 Bardo National Museum attack, which led to the deaths of 21 foreign nationals and a single Tunisian. While Jund al-Khilafah claimed responsibility, Tunisian authorities later linked the brigade as being behind the attack. In retaliation, Tunisian security forces carried out an operation against the group, killing nine militants, including Lokmane Abou Sakhr - organizer of the museum attack.

The Tunisian National Guard dealt further blows to the group on April 30, 2017, with the killing of commander Abu Sufyan al-Soufi. Brigade attacks have still persisted however, evidenced by the landmine attacks in December of that year, which caused the death of a single soldier and the wounding of six more. This is due to the organization's robust organizational structure that allows members to replace fallen commanders and ensure continued operations.

The group faced a lot of in-fighting after the declaration of a caliphate by the Islamic State and the exaggerations said by the Islamic State about the Islamic States' military campaigns, so in 2014, a branch of the militant group, led by Abu Sahkr, split from Al-Qaeda and pledged allegiance to the Islamic State, and the branch loyal to the Islamic State joined the Islamic States' Greater Sahara Province.

=== Islamic State controlled Uqba ibn Nafi Brigade ===
After the branch led by Abu Sahkr joined, and pledged their allegiance to the Islamic State, the newly formed Ifriqiya Media released a statement on behalf of the organization, stating: "The mujahidin brothers in KUBN from the land of al-Qayrawan show support, help, and aid for the Islamic Caliphate State…give victory to the Islamic State, raise its banner and unite the ranks of the mujahideen in every place", which didn't fully represent the whole group, as the statement was in hopes that the rest of the organization would pledge allegiance to Abu Bakr al-Baghdadi and to agitate the organization.

After pledging allegiance to the Islamic State, a year later, 90% of the Uqba Ibn Nafi Brigade's soldiers were killed, according to the Tunisian Interior Minister at the time, Najem Gharselli.
