= The Sons of Rest =

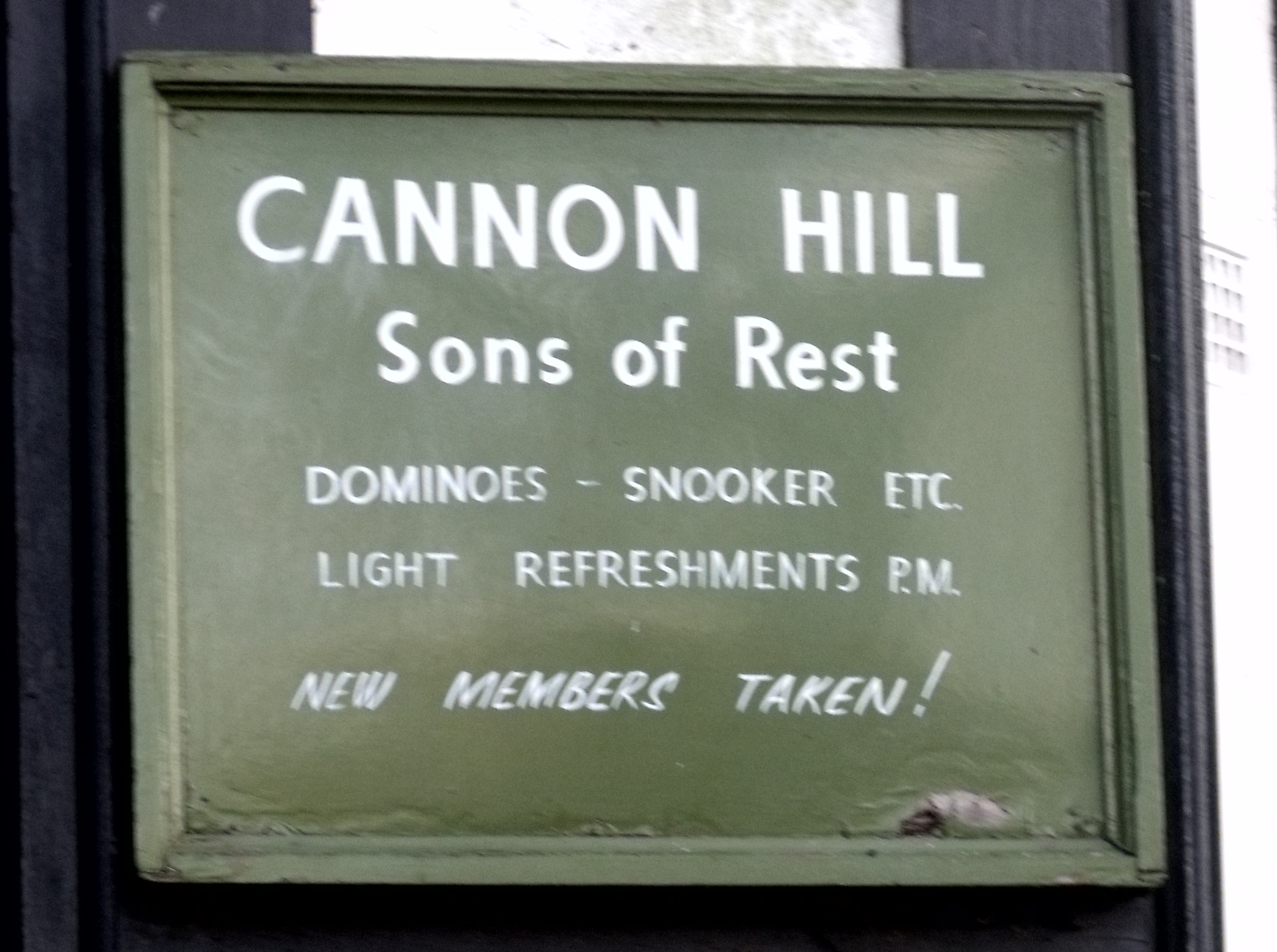
- Sign on The Sons of Rest building in Cannon Hill Park, Birmingham, seen in 2009
- Formation: 1927
- Founder: Lister Muff
- Founded at: Handsworth Park, Birmingham, England
- Type: Voluntary organisation
- Services: Leisure facilities for men (and more recently women) of retirement age

The Sons of Rest is a social organisation that has provided leisure facilities for men of retirement age in and around Birmingham and the Black Country in the English West Midlands since 1927, and more recently for women.

The movement was established when a group of retired working men, veterans of World War I, met in Handsworth Park, Birmingham, in 1927. One of them, Lister Muff (1852-1938) proposed that they form a club. The name was suggested by W. J Ostler recognising that they had been "sons of toil" during their working years.

They originally met in an old cab drivers' shelter in the park in summer and the park's bowling pavilion in winter, but appealed for funding for their own building, where they could meet and play games such as cards, draughts and dominoes. Their appeal succeeded, and the first building was opened in Handsworth Park in 1930.

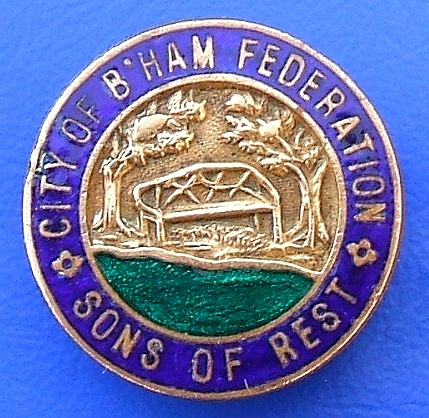
City of Birmingham Federation of The Sons of Rest membership badge

The appeal was supported by the chairman of Birmingham Corporation Parks Committee, Councillor George F. McDonald, who became the first president of "The City of Birmingham Federation of The Sons of Rest", on its inauguration in August 1932. The organisation's anthem, Sons of Rest, was written by one of the early members, Charles Smith, who was aged 81, and blind:

United in our Brotherhood,
Our aim is for the best
We've passed our many milestones long,
Still happy Sons of Rest.

We sit and talk of days gone by,
And how we stood the test,
Of hopes deferred and joys fulfilled,
The stalwart Sons of Rest.

Then let us all with one accord
Proclaim "how we are blessed,"
And let contentment fill our minds,
God bless the Sons of Rest.

At its peak, the organisation had 3,000 members and 29 buildings, located in parks. A number of the buildings survive and are still in use.

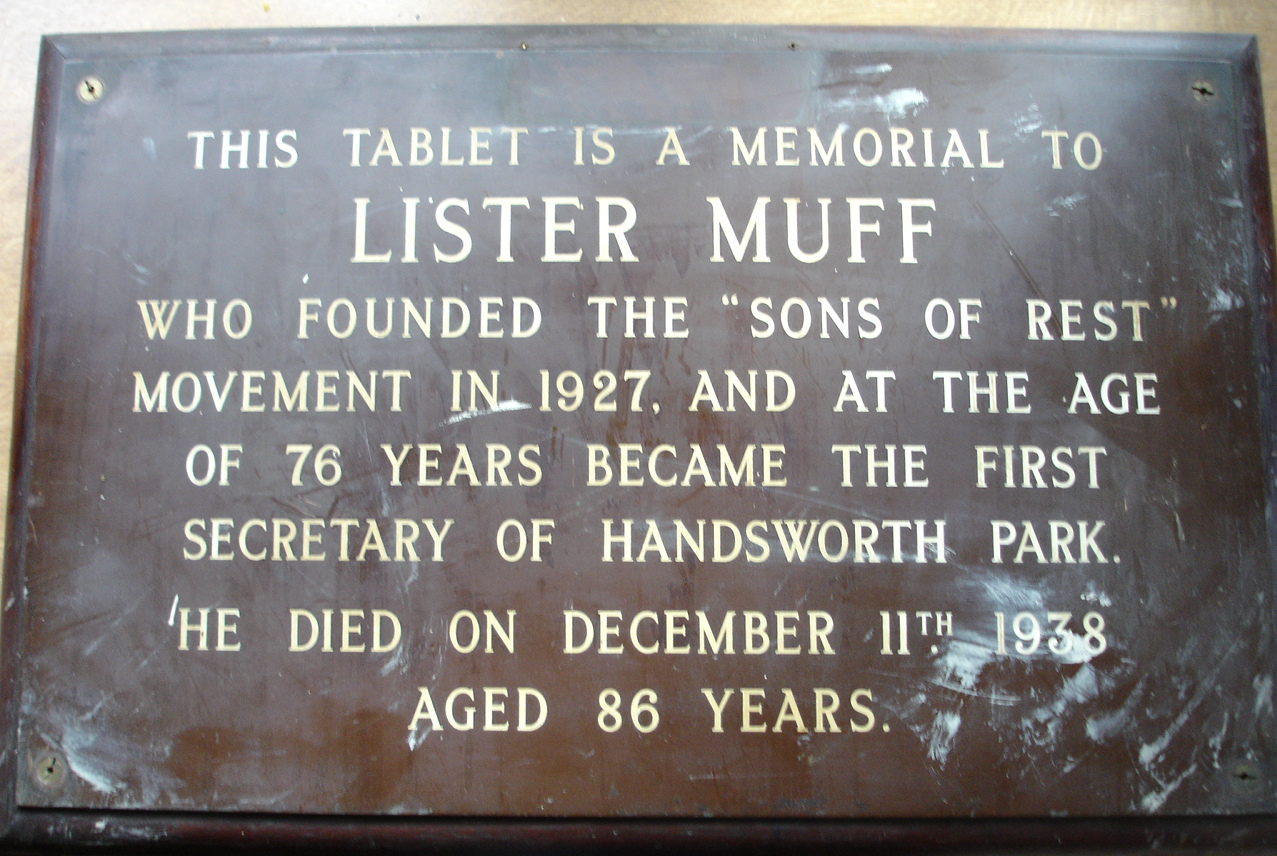
Plaque in the Handsworth Park building, commemorating Lister Muff

The Handsworth building was replaced in 1937. A public campaign prevented its demolition in the 1990s and it was subsequently refurbished. It is now managed by The Friends of Handsworth Park A 2018 mosaic mural by Claire Cotterill, on an external wall, commemorates the movement.

Some branches such as that at Darlaston, rebranded as Sons & Daughters of Rest, and admit women.

== Buildings ==
Name	Location	Completed	Date listed	Geo-coordinates	Notes	Designation	Image	Ref.
Handsworth Park	Handsworth Park, Birmingham	1927			The first site; rebuilt 1937; restored and enlarged 2006		Upload Photo	
Adderley Park	Adderley Park, Birmingham						Upload Photo	
Brookvale Park	Brookvale Park, Birmingham				Destroyed by fire, 2013		Upload Photo	
Cannon Hill Park	Cannon Hill Park, Birmingham						Cannon Hill Park	
Cotteridge Park	Cotteridge Park, Birmingham				Demolished in the late 1990s		Upload Photo	
Digby Park	Digby Park, Small Heath, Birmingham				Destroyed by arson		Upload Photo	
Kings Heath Park	Kings Heath Park, Birmingham						Upload Photo	
Selly Park	Selly Park, Birmingham						Upload Photo	
Small Heath Park	Small Heath Park, Birmingham						Upload Photo	
Ward End Park	Ward End Park, Birmingham						Upload Photo	
Britannia Park	Britannia Park, Blackheath						Upload Photo	
Darlaston Sons & Daughters of Rest	Darlaston						Darlaston Sons & Daughters of Rest	
Buffery Park	Buffery Park, Dudley	1950					Upload Photo	
Haden Hill Park	Old Hill, West Midlands				Destroyed by fire, 2000		Upload Photo	
Walsall Arboretum	Walsall Arboretum, Walsall						Walsall Arboretum	
Brunswick Park	Brunswick Park, Wednesbury						Upload Photo	
Bulwell Forest	Highbury Vale, Nottingham	1938					Upload Photo	
Cripplegate Park	Cripplegate Park, Worcester						Cripplegate Park	
Gheluvelt Park	Gheluvelt Park, Worcester				Replaced by a new building in 2018		Upload Photo	

and others at:

- Coleshill
- Willenhall
- Hill Top, West Bromwich.

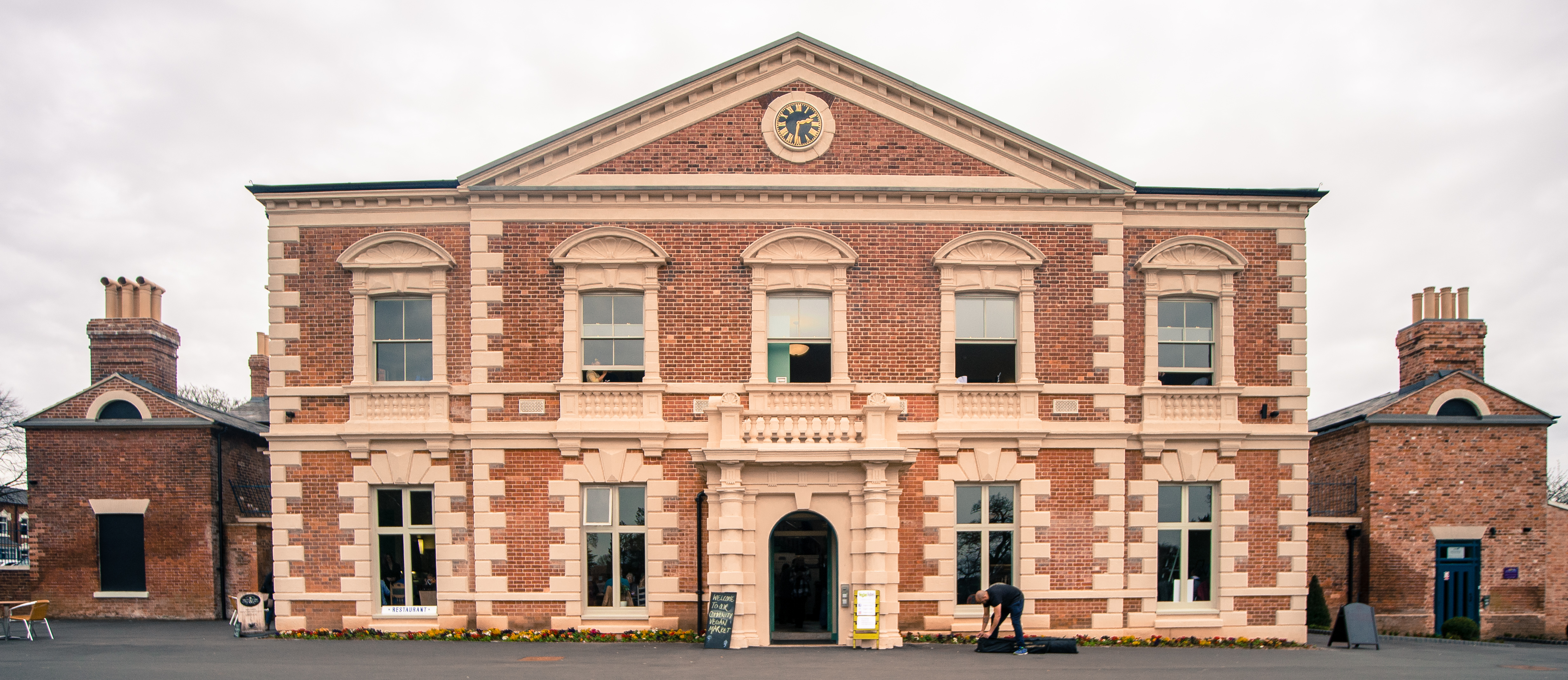
The organisation uses rooms in Lightwoods House (seen here in 2018)

In addition to the above, other branches meet (or met) in hired premises. These include:

- Hamstead, Great Barr
- Eli-Fletcher, Oak Road, West Bromwich
- Lightwoods House, Smethwick
