= Handsworth Park =

Park in Birmingham, England

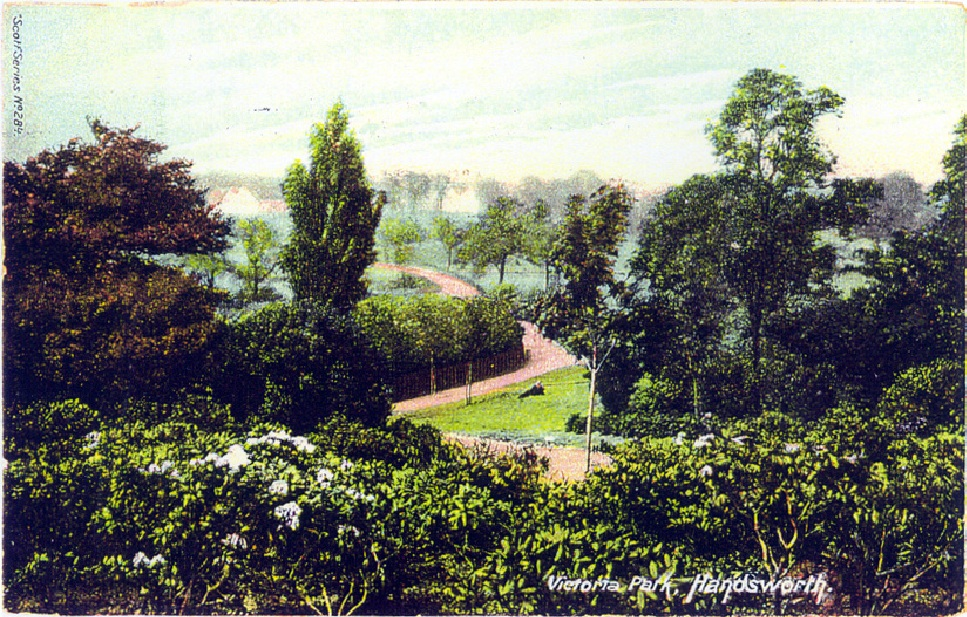
- Early postcard of the Park

- Location within West Midlands county
- Type: Park
- Location: Handsworth
- Nearest city: Birmingham
- Coordinates: 52.50977°N 1.92621°W
- Area: 63 acres (25 ha)
- Created: 25 December 1890

Handsworth Park (originally Victoria Park) is a park in the Handsworth area of Birmingham, England. It lies 15 minutes by bus from the centre of Birmingham and comprises 63 acres (25 hectares) of landscaped grass slopes, including a large boating lake and a smaller pond fed by the Farcroft and Grove Brooks, flower beds, mature trees and shrubs with a diversity of wildlife, adjoining St Mary's Church, Handsworth to the north, containing the graves of the fathers of the Industrial Revolution, James Watt, Matthew Boulton and William Murdoch, and the founders of Aston Villa Football Club and the Victoria Jubilee Allotments site to the south opened on 12 June 2010. The completion of a £9.5 million restoration and rejuvenation of Handsworth Park was celebrated with a Grand Re-Opening Celebration led by Councillor Mike Sharpe, the Lord Mayor of Birmingham, speaking from the restored bandstand at 2.00pm on Saturday 8 July 2006, followed by a count down by a large enthusiastic crowd and the release of clouds of confetti; in the words of one observer "Great wedding! Now we must make the marriage a success."

The park is listed Grade II in Historic England's Register of Parks and Gardens.

== Founding ==
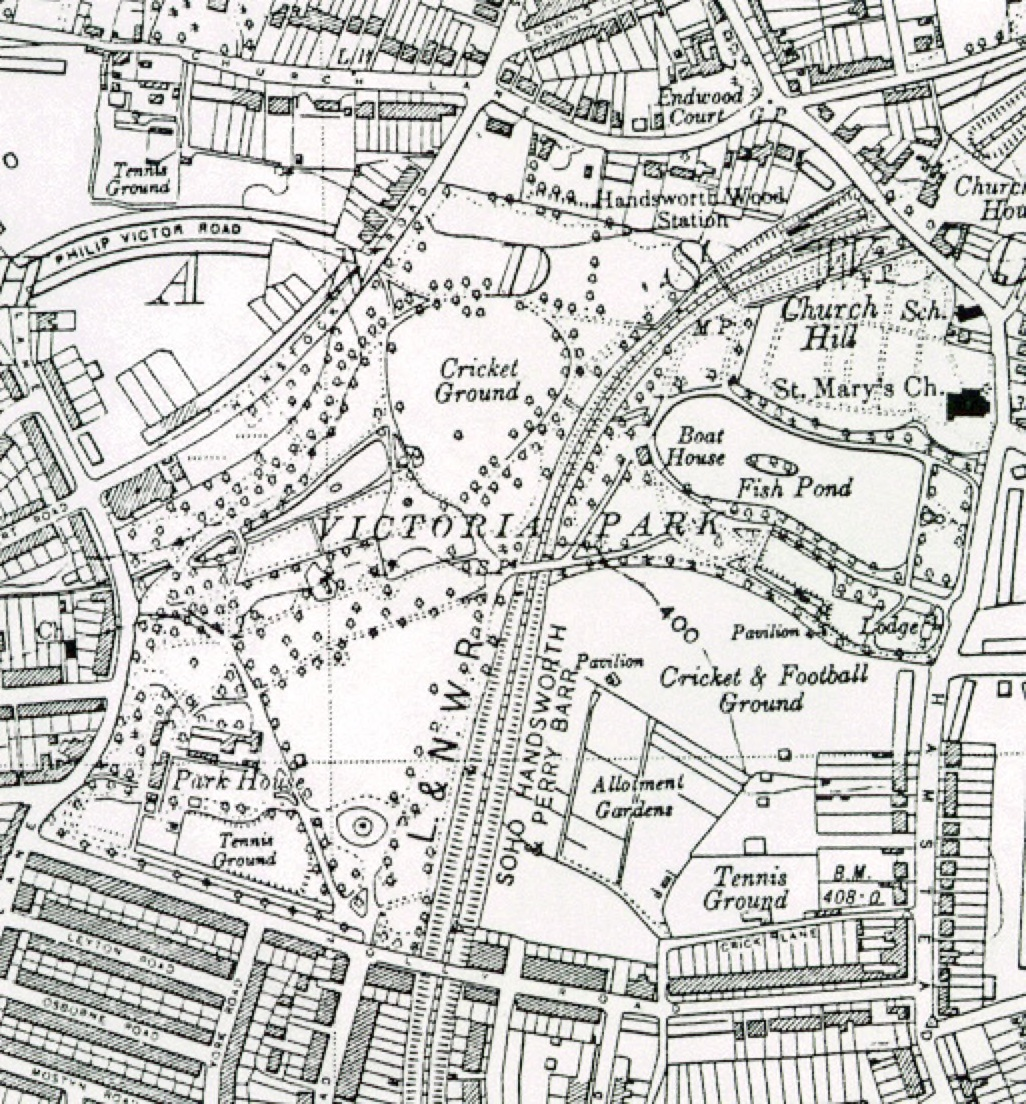
1904 OS map

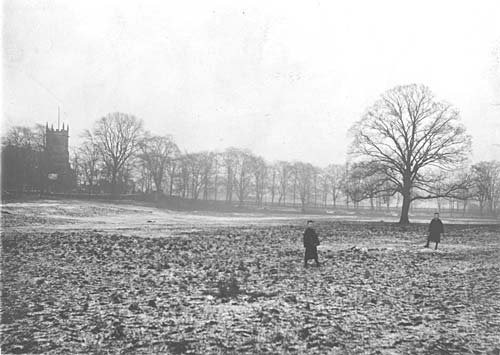
St Mary's glebe before the Park

Handsworth Victoria Park was founded in the 1880s by the Handsworth Local Sanitary Board – a body instituted by the government, and led by locally elected citizens, to oversee the supply of clean water and the laying down of sewers for the growing population of the area. As the Civic Gospel of municipal improvement spread from centre of Birmingham into the growing suburban estates of Handsworth, its local government leaders saw a public park as a benefit for the district. Following the setting up of an education board and a free library, the adoption and proper kerbing of roads, street lighting, tramways and the construction of sewers, influential voices in the district began to speak of the need for a 'lung' in the city. They did not pursue this idea simply out of expediency or to raise the value of their properties. Such self-interest was present – used unashamedly to strengthen their case among the practically minded citizens of Handsworth – but opposition to the Park from that quarter was at times so intense that calculative motives alone would not have carried the project through.

The first part of Handsworth Park was laid out to the west of the original London and North Western Railway and was opened on 25 December 1890 despite initial opposition. At a public meeting in the council offices off Soho Road on 11 January 1887, the Rector of St Mary's Church, Dr. Randall, who could be seen as the voice of receding rural Staffordshire against the spreading metropolis of Birmingham, rose amid the uproar to make what the Handsworth News reporter, with irony, called the speech of the evening: "Allow me to say that from my heart I am the last man in the parish to stand between any object which is for the welfare of the people of the parish. It is because I don't think it is for the well-being that we should have the park that I lift up my voice against it. We have an agricultural parish, and we have some of the finest air in the kingdom, and I believe that the park will be more for the benefit of the roughs of Birmingham." This view was described by the reporter as being received with "a perfect howl of dissent, uproar for at least a minute and cries of 'shame' followed by alternations of groaning and cheering". (Baddeley 1997)

The park is divided into two parts by a working railway line and was the site of Handsworth Wood railway station until 1942. Its western half was landscaped by the award-winning landscape architect Richard Hartland Vertegans who had a liking for broad tree-lined boulevards leading visitors to unexpected prospects. Far from being a disadvantage, the railway running through the completed park would prove consistent with Vertegan's intention, since, to this day, there are people who speak of "never having been to the other side of the park". The eastern side of Handsworth Park – Victoria Park Extension – was laid out 10 years later under the supervision of the local surveyor, Edwin Kenworthy, by the new Handsworth Urban District Council on St. Mary's glebe-land, with the support of a new vicar, the Rev. Prebendary Hodgson, and amid a steady downpour of rain declared "open to the people for ever" by the 6th Earl of Dartmouth on 30 March 1898.

The completed park contains a cricket ground, pavilion, leisure centre – built on the remains of Grove House whose estate was bought to create the original park – a children's play-area, a small distinctive building previously used by the 'Sons of Rest' movement founded by Lister Muff in 1927, small monuments and a bandstand built at the Lion Foundry of Kirkintilloch, near Glasgow. Over the railway bridge you will find a large peaceful looking lake surrounded by plenty of wildlife and flowerbeds filled with colour. Just by the lake there is a new Boathouse. The boats were reintroduced to the lake in June 2009. Thanks to The Handsworth Park Association and a local resident (Mark Bent), The Boathouse has a cafe and is open to the public 7 days a week. The Park has a zero tolerance policy and its well patrolled by the park rangers and local police.

The park was incorporated, with the old Handsworth Urban District – successor to the Handsworth Sanitary Board – into Birmingham City Council in 1911 and was the venue, for many years, of the Birmingham Flower Show and other citywide and national events including dog shows, Girl Guides' and Boy Scout Jamboree.

The Civic Society Garden

In 1922 The Birmingham Civic Society designed and paid for the creation of a new formal garden which they called a "Sunk Garden" near the Grove Lane entrance. The site of the garden was previously an irregular hollow, but the executed design carries on the axial line of the park entrance and featured as its centrepiece a bronze sculpture of a child holding a lamb atop a Portland stone plinth. This was meant to symbolise the historic use of the land as glebe land. The statue was unveiled on 15 January 1937 and was designed by John P. Walker. Unfortunately it was stolen in 1988 and has not been recovered. For more information on the sculpture, follow the Public Monuments & Sculpture Association link below on External Links

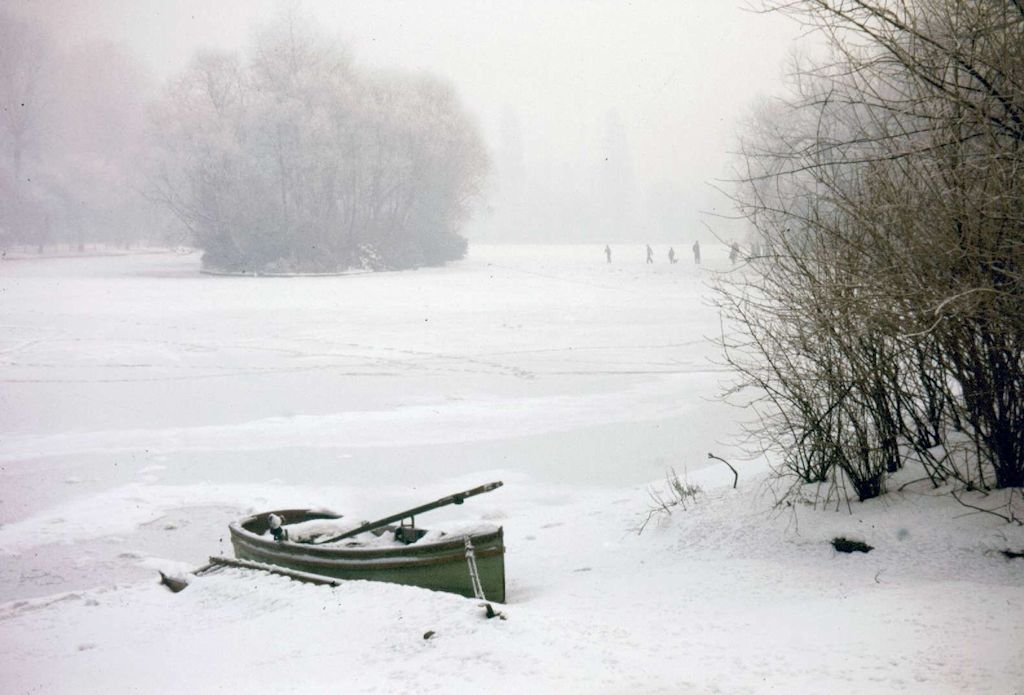
On occasions - such as in this January 1962 scene - the boating pool froze over, allowing people to walk to the central island

From the 1970s the Handsworth Carnival (now removed to Perry Park, Perry Barr, as Birmingham International Carnival, having been said by the acting Head of Parks to have "outgrown Handsworth Park") and later the festival of Vaisakhi.

== Neglect, rediscovery and restoration ==
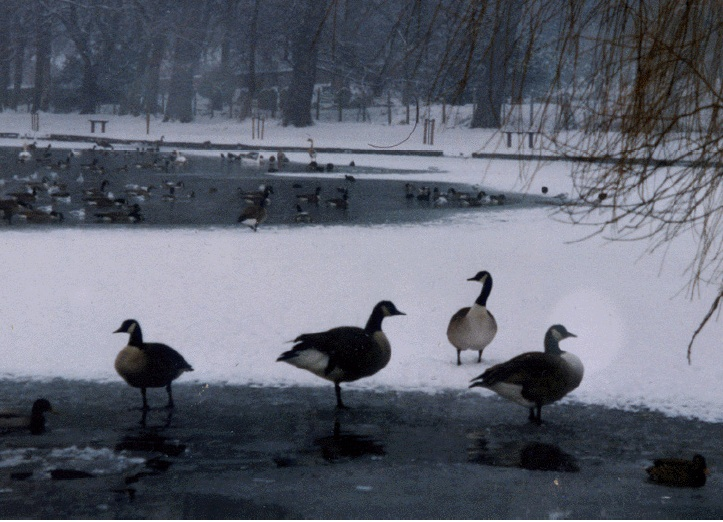
Winter in Handsworth Park

From the 1970s Handsworth Park, like many across the UK, was increasingly neglected, though needed by, happily remembered, respected and enjoyed by citizens from the diverse communities of Sandwell, Handsworth, Soho and Perry Barr, as well as visitors from further afield.

In 1994 a group of local people began to campaign against a plan to build on the site of the old swimming pool, demolition of one of the last 'Sons of Rest' buildings in the city – most others being already demolished with the exception of the one in Cannon Hill Park – and the sale and development of the Victoria Jubilee Allotments site next to the park. Originally called 'Save Handsworth Park', the group renamed itself the 'Handsworth Park Association', when it became clear that the park was to be improved and cared for. From then on members of this group worked in consultation with the City Council's Landscape Practice Group on plans for the restoration of Handsworth Park. The objectives of the Association are: [a) to preserve Handsworth Park for the benefit of the community locally and in the surrounding area. (b) to promote the educational use of the park. [c) to encourage a general appreciation of the history, flora and wildlife of the Park.

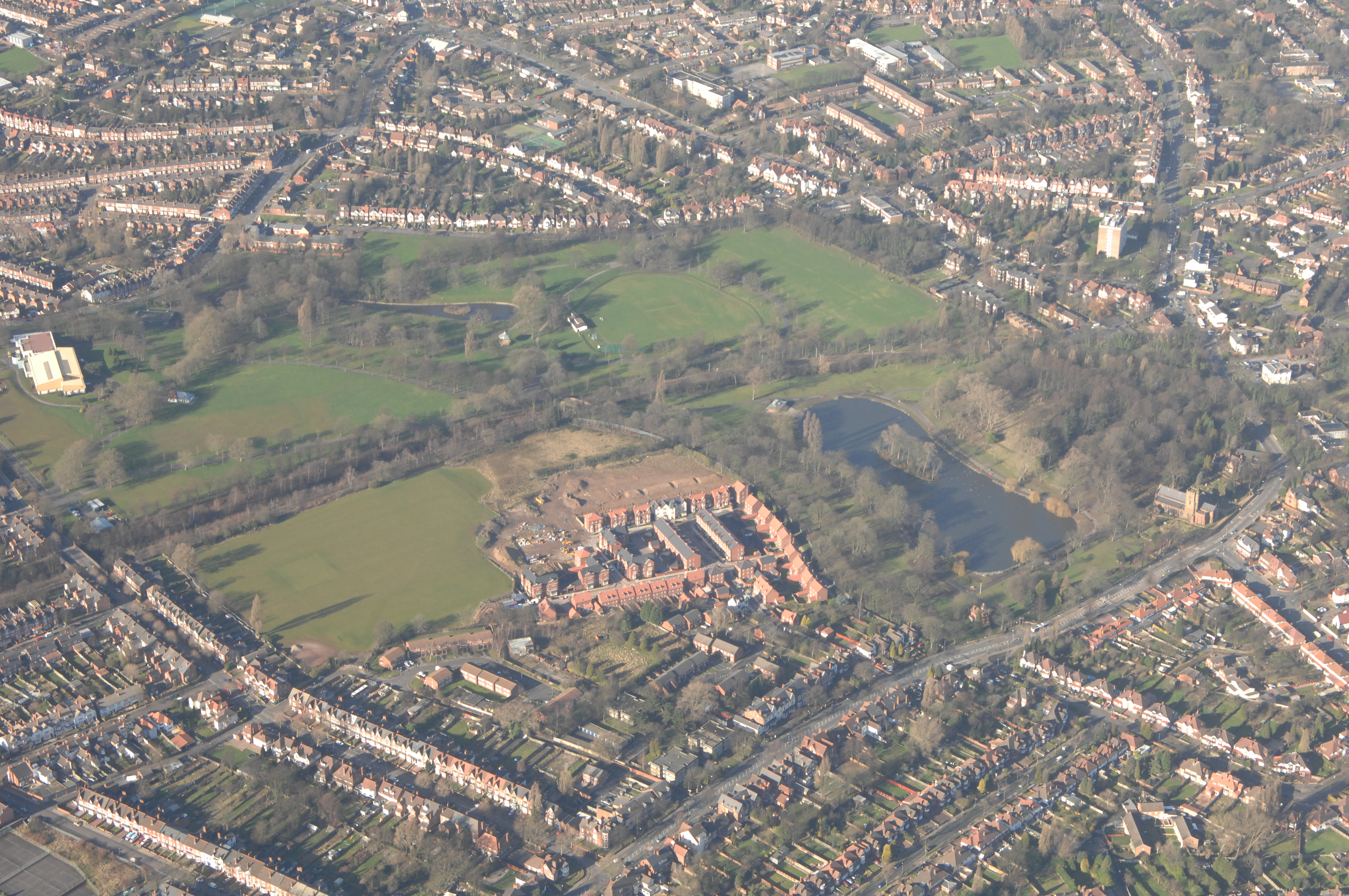
The park from the air, in 2008. St Mary's Church is bottom-right

Consultant for Birmingham City Council, Dr Hilary Taylor, observed:

There is no doubt that Handsworth Park is a successful design, one where everything from the basic landform to the elements of planting and ornament were the outcome of careful consideration, both of the site and the requirements of the local community. There are theatrical contrasts of panoramic space and enclosure, apparently wild nature and intricate artistic detail. All this is linked by an elegant circulation system which afforded opportunities for healthy exercise and ensured that every landscape incident was visited and enjoyed. Today, of course, it takes some time to perceive all this. There is a melancholy quality, conveyed particularly by the dark tree cover, the poor maintenance and lack of care, and—less easy to resolve—the modern intrusions of leisure centre and car parks. The latter have completely altered the character of this park and ensured that attention and resources have been removed from any of those facilities or features which once appealed to the whole community and not just the young and fit.

Though Handsworth Park had never been forgotten by locals despairing at its state, such statements signalled a much wider awareness of Handsworth Park amid a national revival of sensibilities about the importance of green space in cities that would end decades of neglect, whose consequences in dereliction, vandalism and crime was lazily and habitually attributed to the fecklessness of the neglected. The value of parks in cities was once again acknowledged by politicians. Amid the slow burning social fragmentation of Britain's post-industrial Midlands, Handsworth Park, with other parks across the city, was being placed on a par with local housing, education, health and policing as part of what made the area a place where people might actually desire to live and work.
