= Cotteridge Park =

Public park in Birmingham, England

- Interactive map of Cotteridge Park
- Location: Birmingham, England
- Nearest city: Birmingham
- Coordinates: 52°25′18″N 1°55′42″W
- Area: Cotteridge
- Operator: Birmingham City Council
- Open: Always
- Status: Open all year
- Awards: Green Flag Award
- Website: https://cotteridgepark.org.uk

Cotteridge Park is a public park in Cotteridge, Birmingham, England. Cotteridge Park is one of the Victorian parks in the city, set in 22 acres (89,000 m^{2}), and located in the Bournville ward with an active community support group. It contains basketball and tennis courts, an orchard, an amphitheatre, playgrounds, a skateboard park, events space and copses. It had an on-site parkkeeper prior to funding for the role being withdrawn in October 2017 due to a drop of funding from the UK central government as a result of austerity policies.

The Sons of Rest had a building in the park; it was demolished in the late 1990s.

The Friends of Cotteridge Park was established in 1997.

== Community Building ==
The Friends of Cotteridge Park group secured permission and funding for a small community building in the park. Construction began on 25 November 2019 and it was opened to the public during the August 2020. Delays to the construction were caused by the COVID-19 pandemic.
