= Bardo National Museum attack =

2015 mass killing of hostages in Tunis

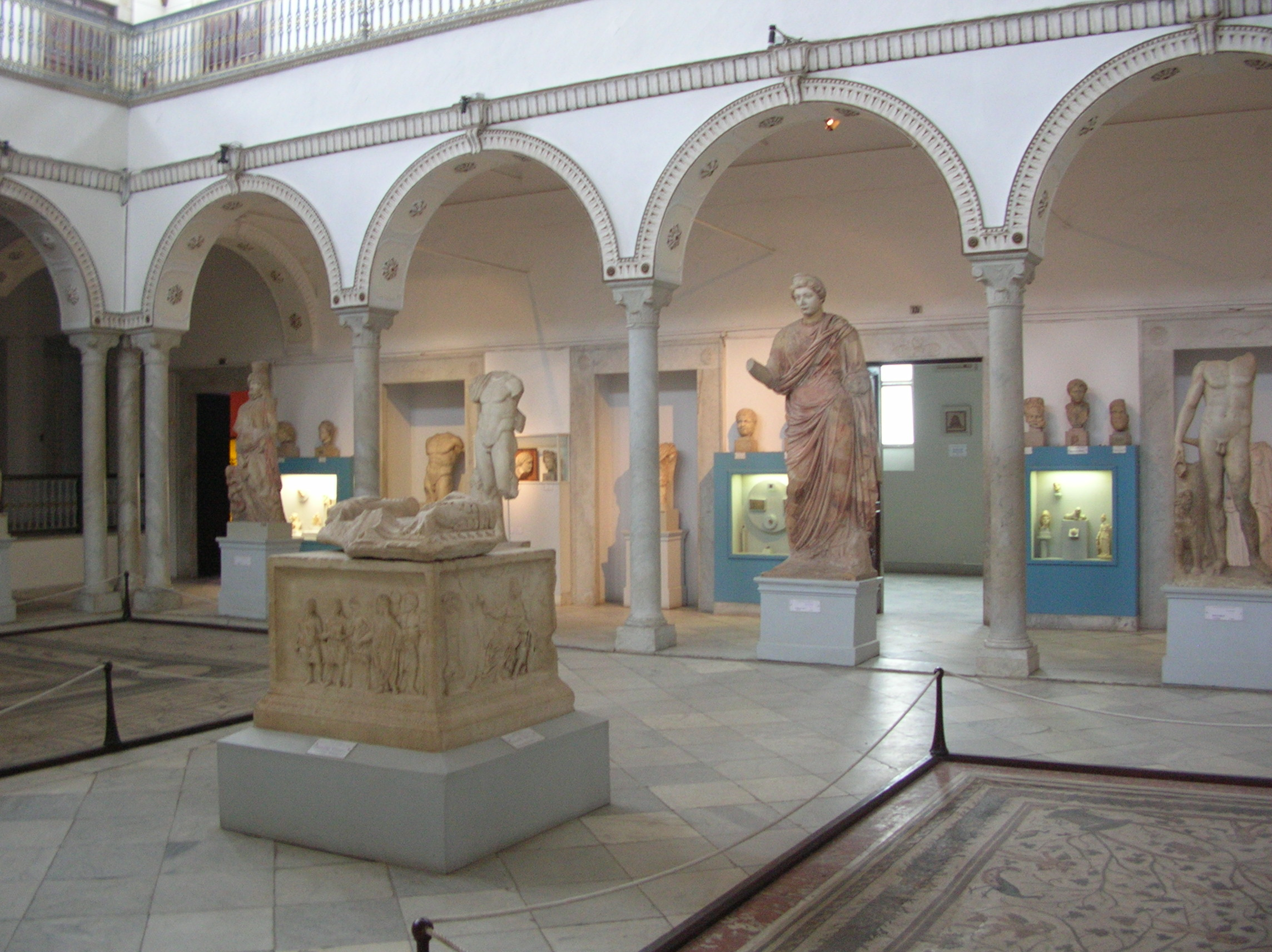
- Tourists, a museum employee, and a member of the Tunisian security forces were killed at the Bardo National Museum in Tunis

- Tunis (Tunisia)
- Location: 36°48′35″N 10°08′02″E; Tunis, Tunisia
- Date: 18 March 2015; 12:30 CET
- Target: Parliament of Tunisia; Bardo National Museum
- Attack type: Mass shooting, hostage taking
- Weapons: Kalashnikov rifles; Hand grenades
- Deaths: 24 (including 2 perpetrators)
- Injuries: 42
- Perpetrators: Islamic State; Uqba ibn Nafi Brigade (suspected)
- Assailants: Yassine Labidi and Saber Khachnaoui (both killed), a third assailant still at large (possibly Maher Ben Moudli Kaidi)

On 18 March 2015, two terrorists attacked the Bardo National Museum in the Tunisian capital city of Tunis, and took hostages. Twenty-one people, mostly European tourists, were killed at the scene, and an additional victim died ten days later. Around fifty others were injured. The two gunmen, Tunisian citizens Yassine Labidi and Saber Khachnaoui, were killed by police. Police treated the event as a terrorist attack.

The Islamic State (IS) claimed responsibility for the attack, and threatened to commit further attacks. However, the Tunisian government blamed a local splinter group of al-Qaeda in the Islamic Maghreb, called the Uqba Ibn Nafi Brigade, for the attack. A police raid killed nine members ten days later.

== Background ==
Since the removal from power of longtime President Zine El Abidine Ben Ali in the 2011 Tunisian Revolution, the country has faced occasional attacks from Islamist militants, mainly in remote areas. Tourism has been important to the nation's economy since its transition to democracy.

== Attack ==
The morning of the attack, the cruise ships MSC Splendida and Costa Fascinosa docked at the Port of La Goulette. Some of the passengers on board the ships had decided to go to the Bardo Museum. At the time of the attack, more than 200 tourists were present in the vicinity.

The attack began at around 12:30 p.m. At that time, security guards protecting the museum and the nearby Parliament building were absent on a coffee break. The tourists were attacked as they were getting off a bus to enter the Bardo Museum compound. As scores of visitors ran toward the museum to avoid the shooting, the attackers pursued them and took them hostage inside. The siege lasted three hours, ending when security forces breached the building and killed two of the attackers. One policeman was fatally shot during the rescue operation.

Tunisian security forces escorted dozens of tourists up nearby steps and away from the danger, as armed agents pointed guns toward an adjacent building. Many tourists ran in panic to safety, including at least one couple carrying two children.

During the attack, members of Parliament were discussing counter-terrorist legislation when they were ordered to evacuate the building due to the sound of gunfire. They were later forced to lie down on the ground as security forces commenced the rescue operation of hostages.

== Aftermath ==
According to analyst Rita Katz of the SITE Intelligence Group, holders of Twitter accounts associated with IS were overjoyed at the attack, urging Tunisians to "follow their brothers". The day following the attack, the Islamic State group issued a statement claiming responsibility for the incident and promising further attacks. Meanwhile, a Twitter account linked to the Islamic State published a photograph of one of the Italian victims; the image, showing Francesco Caldara, has a red cross drawn on it and the words: "Crusader Crushed."

Anti-terrorism protests began in central Tunis after the attack, with crowds reportedly chanting, "Tunisia is free, terrorism out." On 24 March, nearly a week after the attack, the museum held a ceremonial reopening. Simultaneously, thousands of Tunisians and tourists staged a march in Tunis to show their solidarity with the slain victims.

On 29 March, tens of thousands of demonstrators, along with French President François Hollande, Italian Prime Minister Matteo Renzi, and several other world leaders, marched in Tunis under the slogan The World Is Bardo (Le Monde est Bardo) to protest terrorism.

=== Victims ===
Deaths by nationality
Country	Number
France	4
Italy	4
Japan	3
Poland	3
Colombia	2
Spain	2
Tunisia	1
Belgium	1
Russia	1
United Kingdom	1
Total	22

When the attack ended, nineteen foreign tourists, including four Italians, three French nationals, three Japanese, three Polish nationals, two Spaniards, two Colombians (including one with dual Australian citizenship), one Russian, and one British national were found to have been killed. A Tunisian police officer and two perpetrators were also reported dead. On 28 March, an injured French woman, Huguette Dupeu, died of her wounds at a hospital.

Over 50 other people were injured, many of them foreign tourists. MSC Crociere S.A. reported that nine of its passengers had been killed, and twelve were injured; the dead included two Spaniards, one Belgian, one British national, one French national and one Japanese. The cruise company said that it would not schedule any further visits to the Port of La Goulette in 2015, choosing Malta as a replacement.

== Perpetrators ==
Yassine Labidi and Saber Khachnaoui, both Tunisian citizens, were identified by Tunisian Prime Minister Habib Essid as the two slain gunmen a day after the attack. Prior to the attack, Labidi lived in the Tunis neighborhood of Ibn Khaldoun, while Khachnaoui was from Kasserine. According to Labidi's relatives, he disappeared for a month after the Jasmine Revolution saying that he went to Sfax for work. He worked as a deliveryman for a local business prior to the attack. While Labidi was known to intelligence services, neither of the two men had previously been positively linked to known Tunisian terrorist organisations.

An operation looking for up to three suspected accomplices was launched immediately following the attack. On the following day, nine people were arrested, four for direct links to the cell which carried out the shooting and five for having indirect links to it. Their roles in the attack have not yet been clarified. On 21 March, the number of people arrested reached over twenty, with ten accused of having direct links to the museum attack. On 26 March, authorities arrested twenty-three members of a terror cell linked to the attack.

According to BBC security correspondent Frank Gardner, an al-Qaeda operative claimed the men had spent two months training with militants in Derna, Libya. On 20 March, Tunisian Security Minister Rafik Chelly announced that Labidi and Khachnaoui had received weapons training in Libya from an unspecified group prior to carrying out the attack. According to authorities, they managed to slip past the border to Libya undetected in December.

On 28 March, Tunisian police killed Lokman Abu Sakhra, an Algerian suspected of planning the attack, along with eight other armed men during a raid in the southern Gafsa region. They were allegedly major members of the Okba Ibn Nafaa Brigade, a splinter group of al-Qaeda in the Islamic Maghreb. Interior Ministry spokesman Mohamed Ali Aroui said, "[T]he nine were among the most dangerous terrorists in Tunisia." Sakhra was said to be the leader of the group. The Tunisian government said the Okba Ibn Nafaa Brigade was responsible for the attack, despite claims of responsibility made by the Islamic State.

On 20 May 22-year-old Moroccan illegal immigrant Abdelmajid Touil was arrested in Italy on allegations that he aided the attackers.

In December 2017 US Secretary of State Rex W. Tillerson named Wanas al-Faqih and two other men as terrorists. On 4 January 2018, when the State Department listed al-Faqih on its list of globally designated terrorists they described him as having planned the Bardo Museum attack.

== Reactions ==
=== Domestic ===
Tunisian President Beji Caid Essebsi announced via Facebook that he would address the nation later that day. In his address, he called the attack a "huge disaster" and called for Tunisia to prevent such an attack in the future, further saying that the country was in a "war against terrorism". He also pledged for the quick passage of an anti-terrorism law. Prime Minister Habib Essid issued a statement on the "cowardly" attack and called for unity, later chairing an emergency cabinet meeting. On the day following the attack, Essebsi ordered the deployment of Tunisian troops to the country's major cities as a security precaution.

=== International ===
Australian Foreign Affairs Minister Julie Bishop called the incident a "terrorist attack on a fledgling democracy", and Prime Minister Tony Abbott sent his condolences to the family of an Australian killed in the attack. British Foreign Secretary Philip Hammond described the killings as a "cowardly terrorist attack", whilst Prime Minister David Cameron described the incident as "appalling and brutal". Colombian President Juan Manuel Santos lamented the death of the two Colombians killed in the attack and expressed his solidarity with their families; the foreign ministry added a statement. French Prime Minister Manuel Valls condemned the attack. Italian Prime Minister Matteo Renzi condemned the attack and emphasized that Italy is close to the Tunisian government. President Sergio Mattarella condemned the attack as "a fact of unprecedented violence". The Japanese government condemned the attack as "despicable", while Prime Minister Shinzō Abe, in addition to his own condemnation, stated that Tokyo was working to collect further information. The Ministry of Foreign Affairs and Cooperation of Spain condemned the attack in a press release.

Condolences and outrage were expressed by other states, including the Holy See, Mexico, the Sahrawi Arab Democratic Republic, Singapore, Syria, Turkey, and the United States.

== Memorials ==
On 4 March 2019, a memorial to the British victim and those of the 2015 Sousse attacks, called Infinite Wave, was unveiled in Cannon Hill Park, Birmingham, England, by Prince Harry, Duke of Sussex.

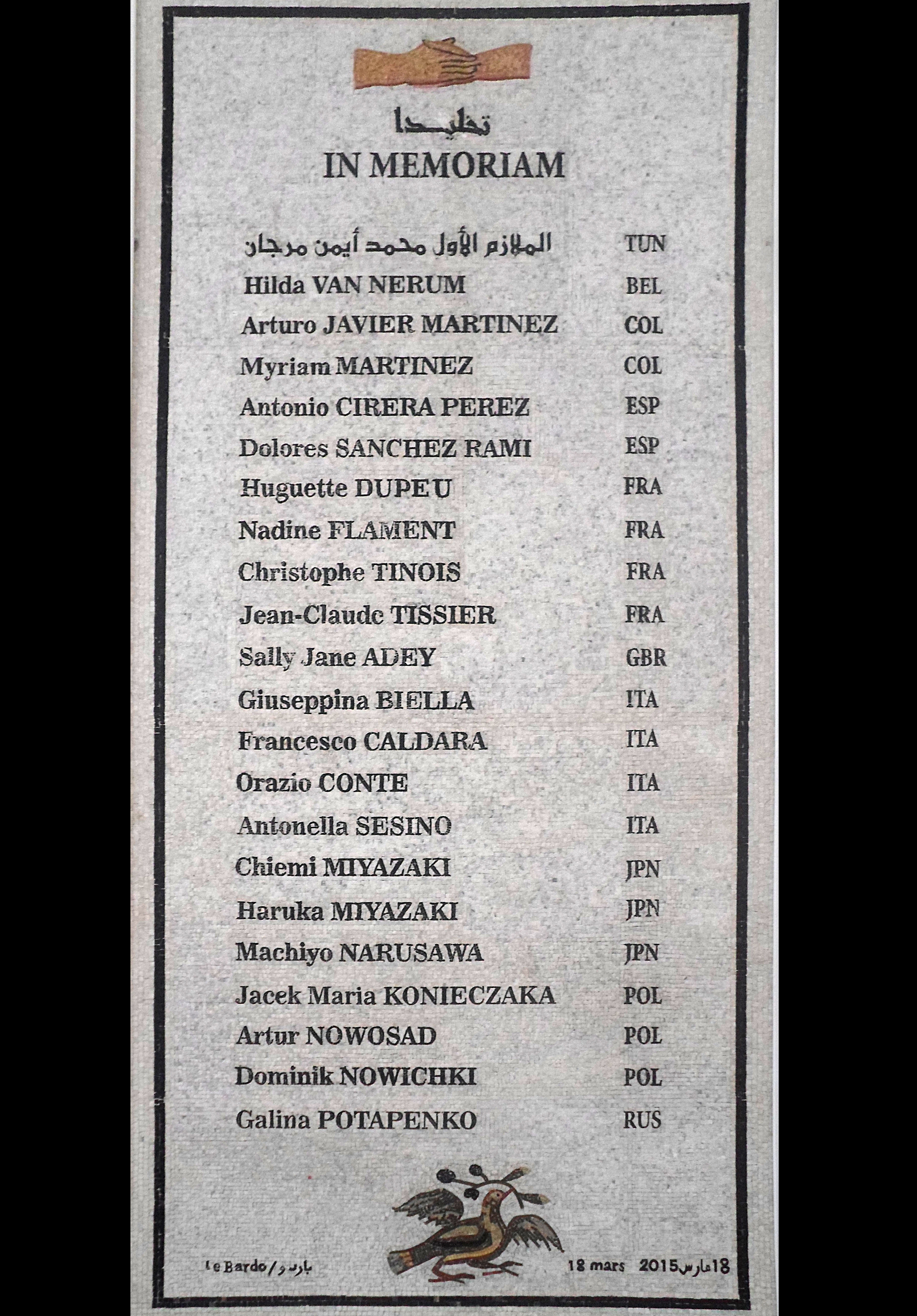
Memorial with the names of victims at the entrance.

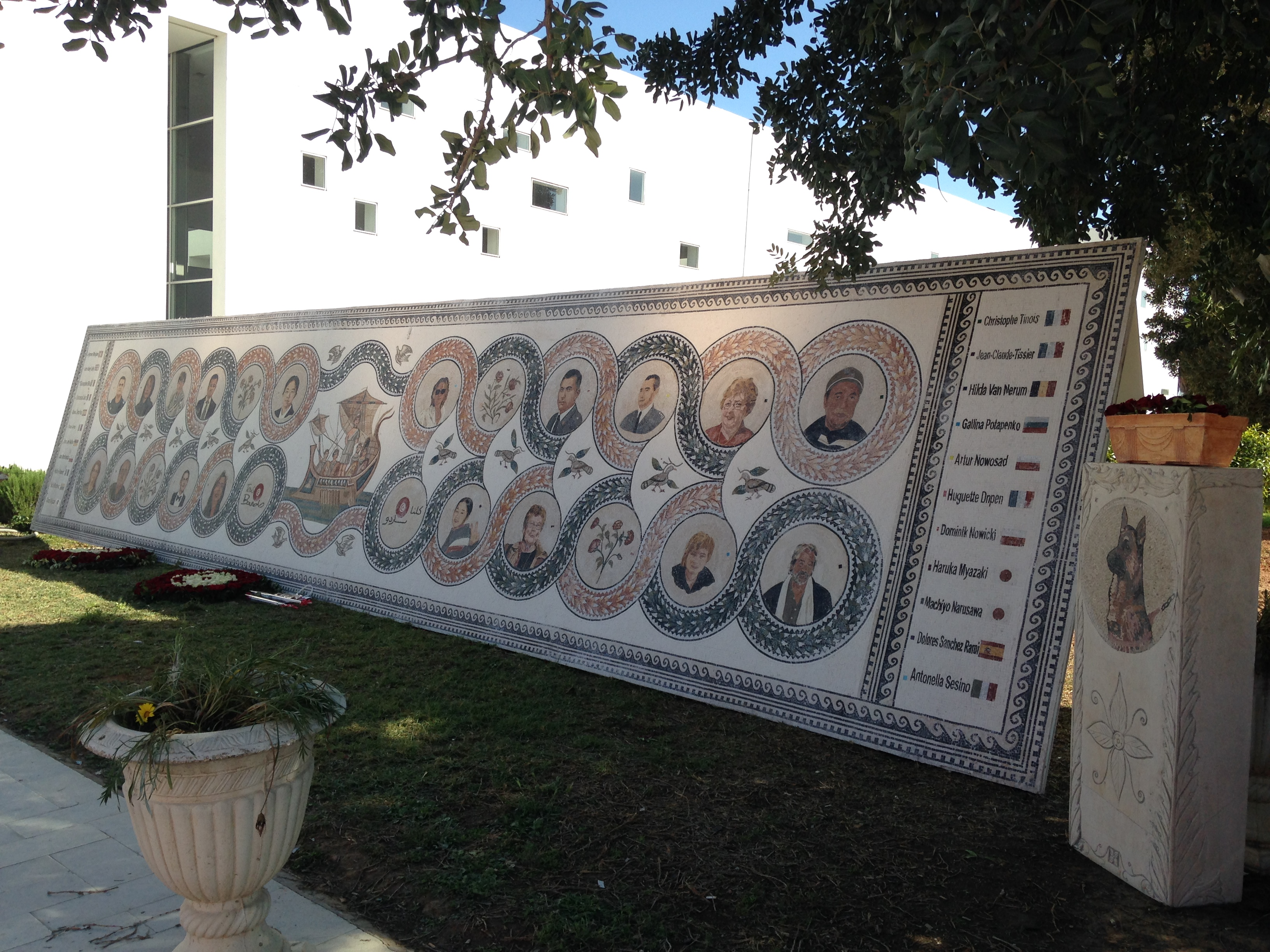
Mosaic memorial at the Bardo Museum to the victims of the attack

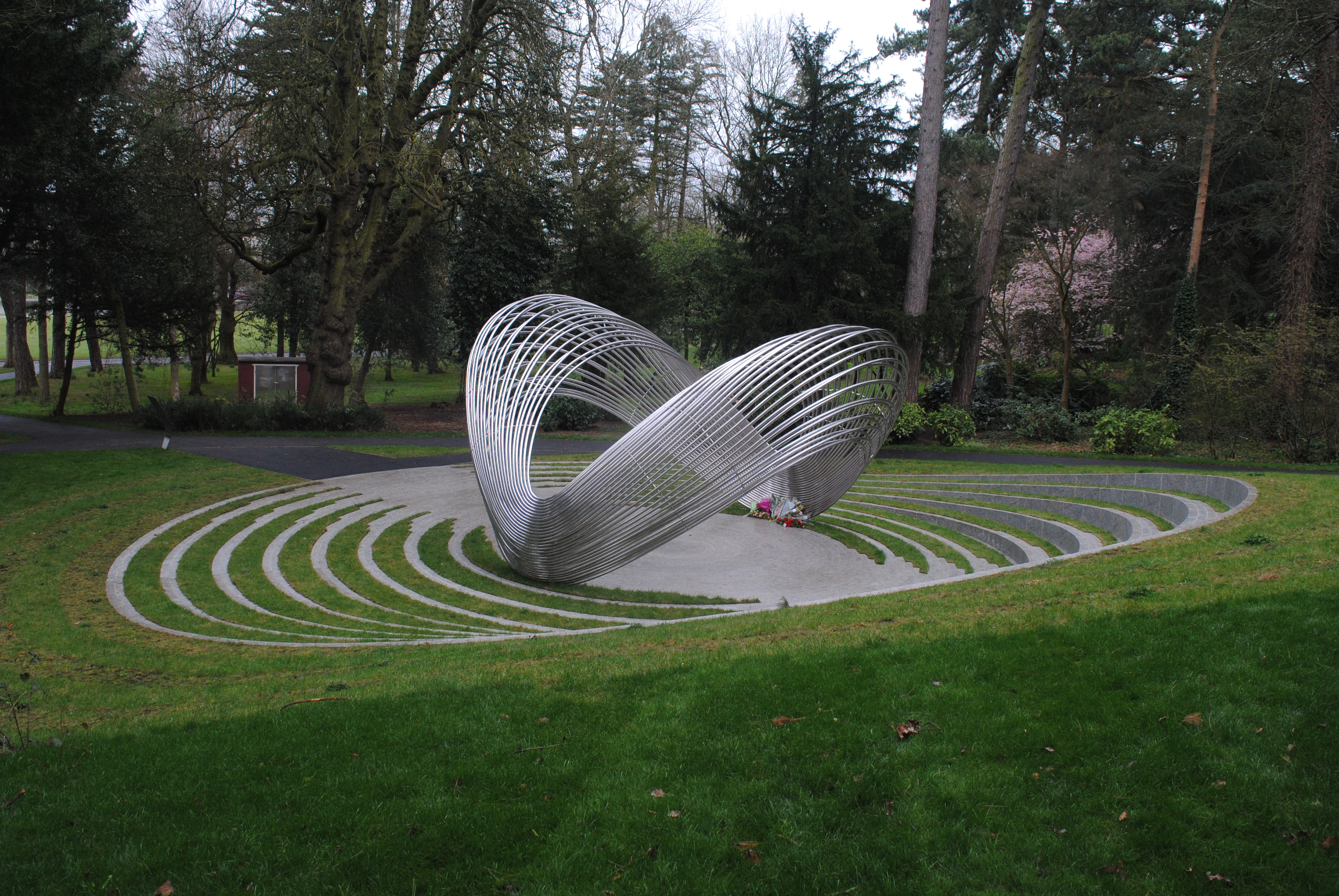
Infinite Wave, Birmingham, England.

== See also ==
- List of terrorist incidents, 2015
- List of terrorist incidents in Tunisia
