= The World Is Bardo =

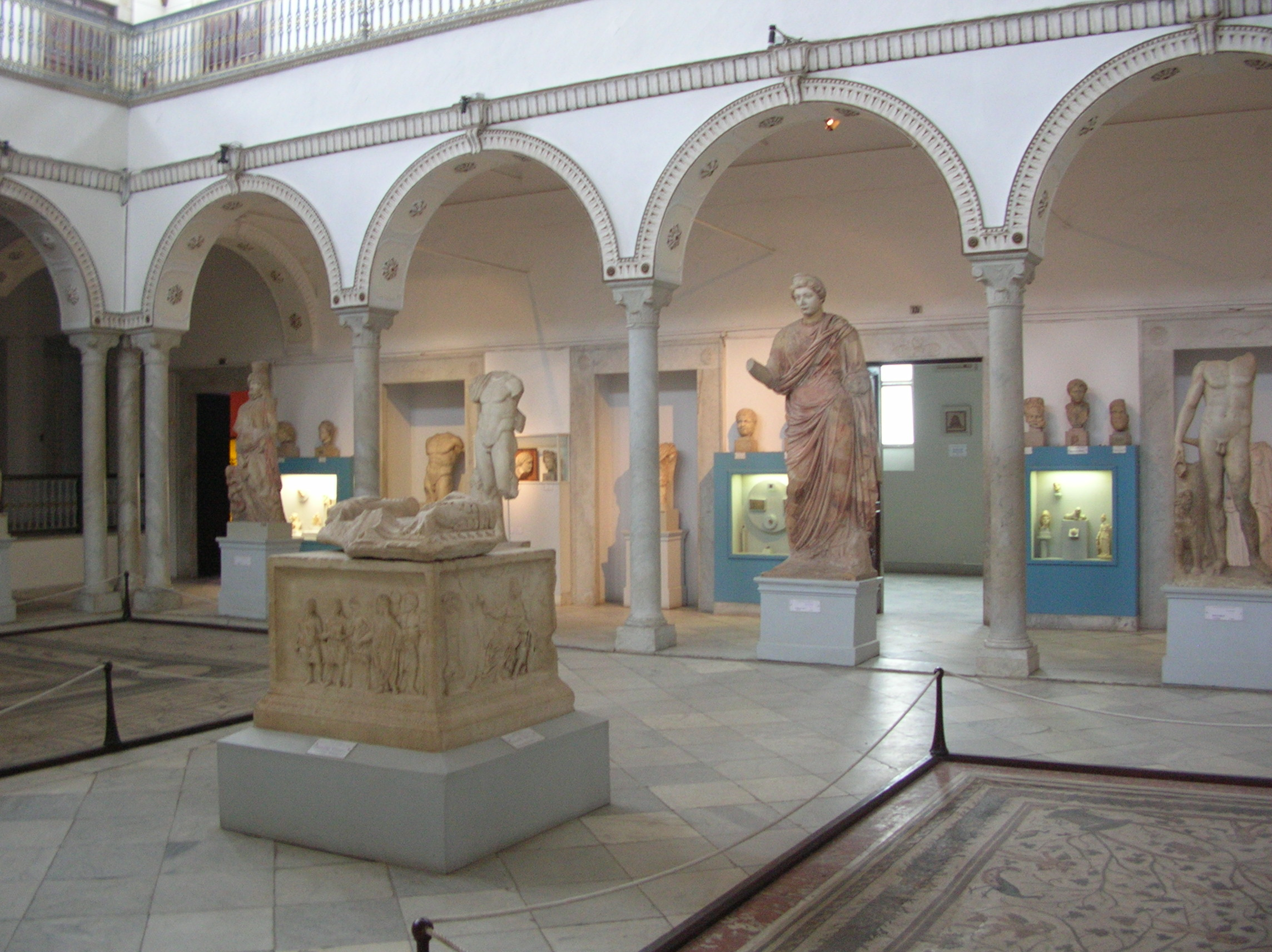
- Bardo National Museum, Tunisia
- Date: 29 March 2015
- Location: Tunis, Tunisia
- Also known as: Je suis Bardo; Je suis Tunisie
- Participants: Tunisian and foreign citizens National and international political leaders
- Outcome: War on terror Fight against ISIL; Opposition to Bardo National Museum attack

The World Is Bardo (Le Monde est Bardo) was the slogan and theme of a peaceful, anti-terrorist rally and march that took place on 29 March 2015 in Tunis, Tunisia. Thousands of Tunisians came out to protest the 18 March Bardo National Museum terrorist attacks by the Islamic State of Iraq and the Levant (ISIL) and to express support for the victims. Many world leaders participated to the event including François Hollande, Matteo Renzi, Bronisław Komorowski, Mahmoud Abbas, Ali Bongo Ondimba, Abdelmalek Sellal, Charles Michel, Abdullah al-Theni, Federica Mogherini and Beji Caid Essebsi.

== Organization ==
After the terrorist attack on the Bardo National Museum, the Government of Tunisia decided to organize a protest in reaction against the attack and terrorism. The event was composed of two marches: A march for civil and an official march involving dignitaries and world leaders. The popular march passed through the important roads of Tunis before arriving at the Bardo National Museum. The official march ended inside the museum.

Speaking before the beginning of the march, Habib Essid, the Prime Minister of Tunisia, announced the death of nine terrorists from ISIL who were behind the attack.

== Circumstances ==
The popular march had many thousands of moderate Tunisian citizens protesting ISIL terrorism; they adopted the chant, "Tunisia is free! Terrorism out!" In the official march, a memorial listing the names of victims was unveiled next to the main doors of the museum. Beji Caid Essebsi, the President of Tunisia, delivered a speech in which he thanked all of the participating leaders and said that the Tunisian people had proved that they were not afraid of terrorism and that they would stand as one to face it. In the same speech, he accidentally called François Hollande, the President of France, by the name of François Mitterrand, the former President of France. Hollande laughed and the two leaders kissed each other. After the speech, participating world leaders visited the Bardo National Museum.
