= Buffery Park =

Park in Dudley, West Midlands, England

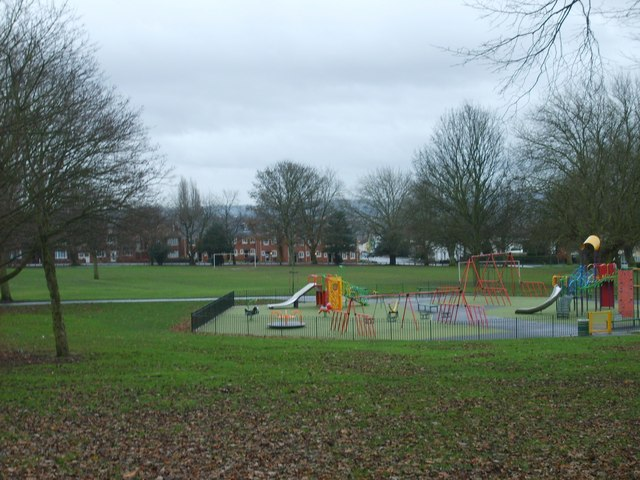
- The park from Prospect Row in 2007

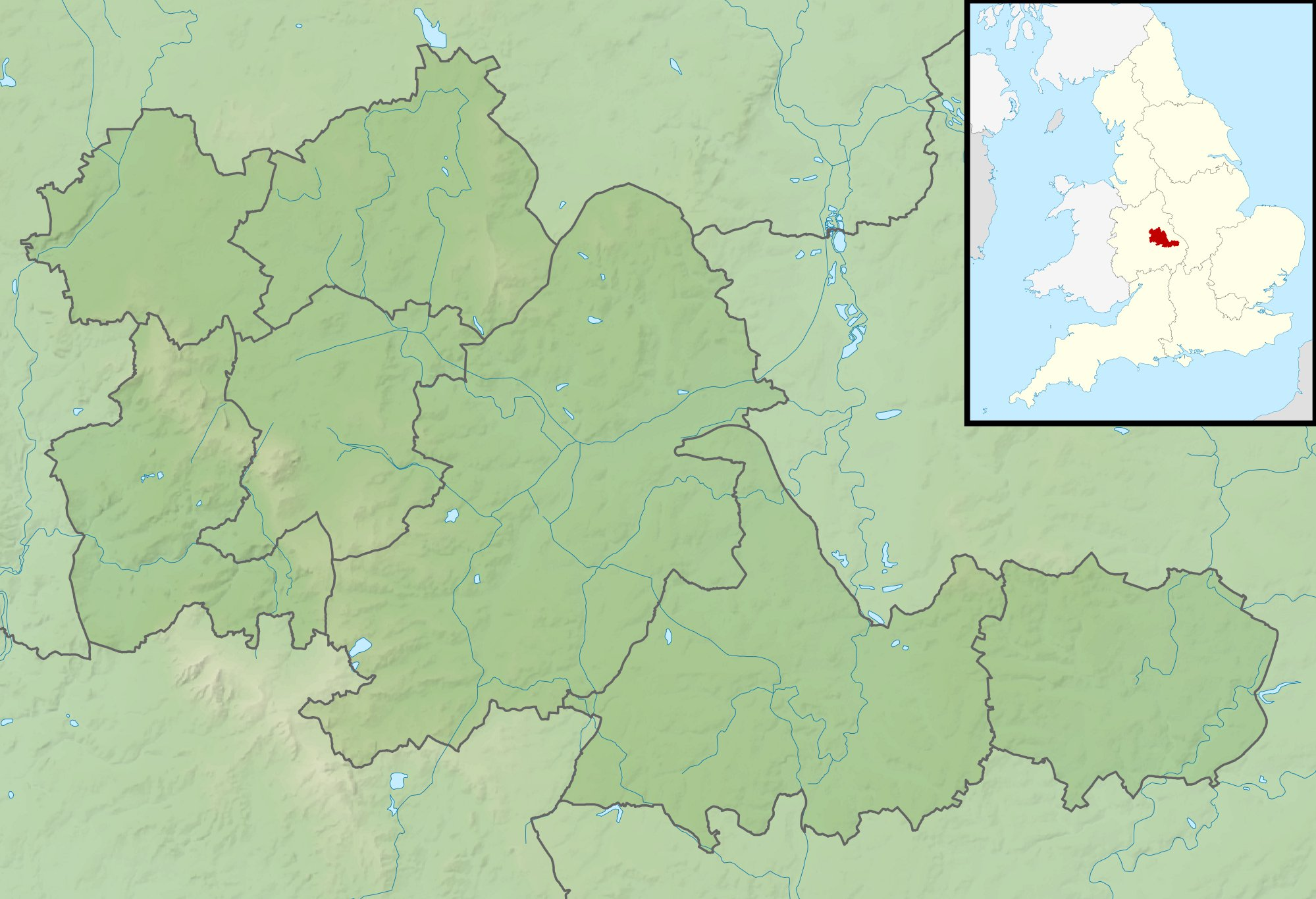
- Location within West Midlands county
- Interactive map of Buffery Park
- Location: Dudley, West Midlands
- OS grid: SO 947 894
- Coordinates: 52°30′8″N 2°4′46″W
- Area: 6 hectares (15 acres)
- Created: 1893
- Operator: Metropolitan Borough of Dudley
- Website: www.dudley.gov.uk/things-to-do/parks-and-open-spaces/parks-in-the-borough/buffery-park/

Buffery Park is a park of the Metropolitan Borough of Dudley, in the Paradise area of Dudley, West Midlands, England. It has a range of leisure facilities, including a tennis court, an outdoor gym and a football pitch. There is a community centre and, in a section of the park, a war memorial.

== Description ==
=== History ===
The park has an area of about 6 hectares (15 acres). It was formerly the site of Old Buffery Colliery; it was purchased from M & W Grazebrook in 1891, and opened in 1893 with a range of recreational facilities. The garden was maintained by council staff. For many years there was a conservatory, or Glass Pavilion; there were four tennis courts, a cycle track, a bowling green and a putting pitch.

The Friends and Residents of Buffery Park was established in 2001, after concerns were raised about the deteriorating state of the park. The group carries out projects to improve the park, with assistance from funding bodies, and organises events.

The park received a Green Flag Award in 2016.

=== Grazebrook Memorial ===
A section of the park has at its centre the Grazebrook Memorial, built between 1922 and 1923. It was created by Francis Grazebrook, of M & W Grazebrook, and dedicated to his son Charles, who died in 1915 during the Great War; it pays tribute to soldiers who served and died for their country during the war. The original cross, over 10 ft high, was damaged by lightning in 1960 and removed; a smaller cross was placed there in the 1990s. A cross made to the original design was installed in 2016.

=== Paradise Centre ===
The Paradise Centre, within the park, was originally a building of the Sons of Rest and opened in 1950. It re-opened in 1969 a community building, and renamed the Buffery Paradise Centre in 2012. It has seating up to 35; it may be hired for parties and meetings.
