= Birmingham Wildlife Conservation Park =

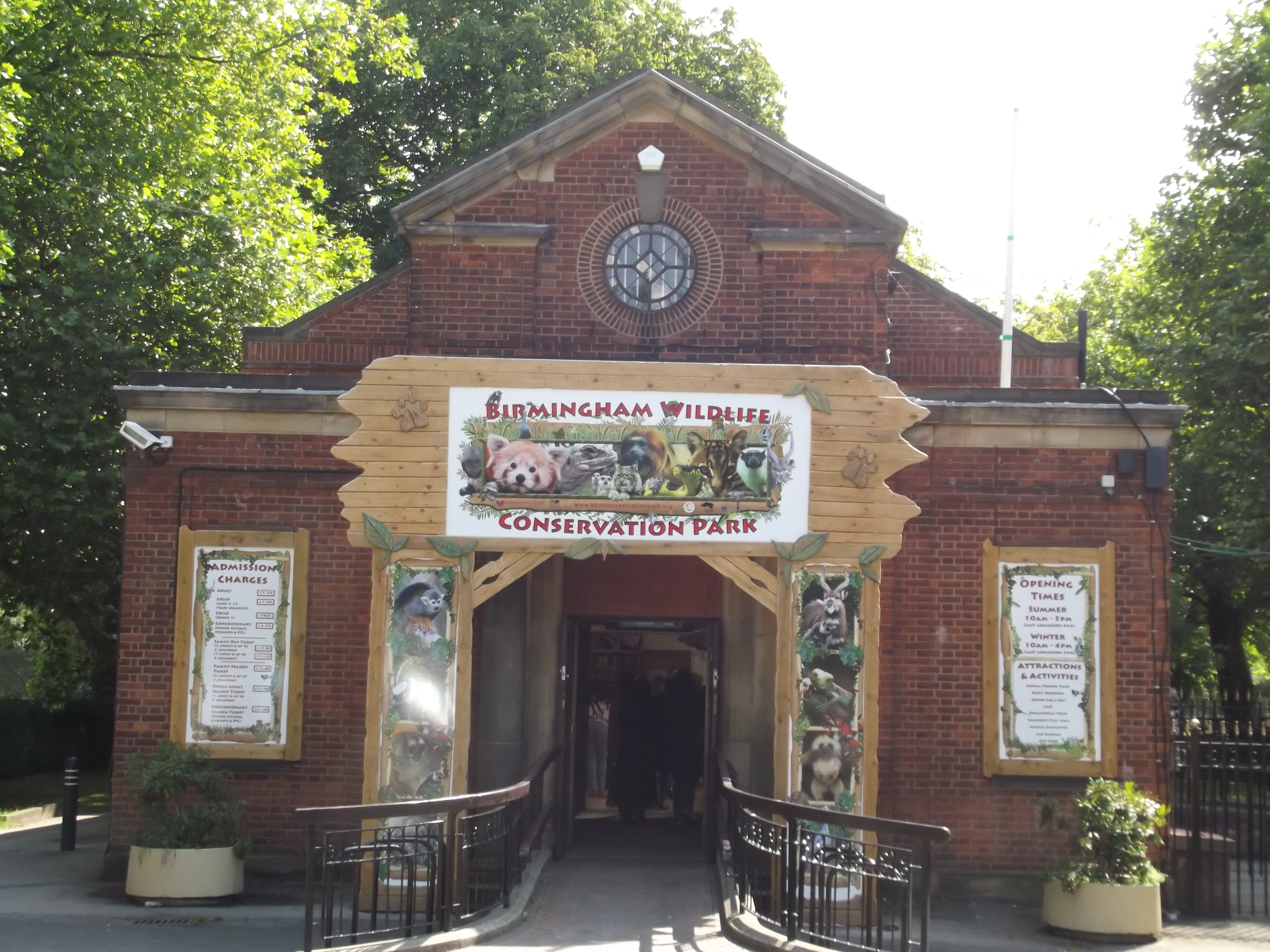
- Entrance in 2014
- Interactive map of Birmingham Wildlife Conservation Park
- 52.450498°N 1.910430°W
- Date opened: 1974
- Location: Pershore Road; Edgbaston; Birmingham; England; United Kingdom
- Land area: 6.5 acres (2.6 ha)
- Memberships: BIAZA, EAZA
- Major exhibits: Red pandas, Komodo dragon, Eurasian lynx, many species of lemur, tamarin and monkeys, Asian short-clawed otters, northern bald Ibis
- Website: Birmingham Wildlife Conservation Park

Birmingham Wildlife Conservation Park, formerly Birmingham Nature Centre, and before that Birmingham Zoo, is a small zoo on the edge of Cannon Hill Park in Birmingham, England. It is owned and managed by Birmingham City Council.

As well as catering to tourists and locals, the zoo is actively involved in many scientific programmes, such as the EEP captive breeding programmes with endangered animals, helping to highlight the plight of the world's biodiversity through educational talks and campaigns.

The zoo is a member of the British and Irish Association of Zoos and Aquariums (BIAZA) and the European Association of Zoos and Aquaria (EAZA).

== History ==
Birmingham Zoo was opened on 1 May 1964 by the Dudley Zoological Society, within Cannon Hill Park. The site of the park was once part of a 16th-century fulling mill, known as Pebble Mill.

It was designed to exhibit mainly young animals, but it also housed Dudley Zoo's collection of monkeys and two dromedaries for rides.

Once described as a little gem of a zoo, it closed in 1973 for unknown reasons. It was reopened in 1974 by Birmingham City Council as the Birmingham Nature Centre. The centre and its entrance were originally part of the Birmingham Natural History Museum. In 2014 it was rebranded as Birmingham Wildlife Conservation Park.

== Earlier zoos ==
Birmingham has had a number of zoos over the years. The first was the Birmingham and Midlands Zoological Gardens in Balsall Heath, opened in 1873. The second was Aston Lower Grounds Menagerie in Aston, opened in 1880. The last was Birmingham Zoo, which opened in 1910 but closed in 1930. There was also said to be a travelling menagerie, named J. E. James's Menagerie.

== Animals ==
The zoo features mainly small mammals. Its occupants include:

- Red pandas
- Capybaras
- Komodo dragons
- Eurasian lynxes
- Ocelots
- Two-toed sloths
- Capuchin monkeys
- Spider monkeys
- Saki monkeys
- Squirrel monkeys
- Goeldi's monkeys
- Titi monkeys
- Asian small-clawed otters
- Meerkats
- Bush dogs
- Binturongs
- Ring-tailed lemurs
- Red ruffed lemurs
- Alaotran gentle lemurs
- Wallabies
- Cotton-topped tamarins
- Emperor tamarins
- Pied tamarins
- Golden lion tamarins
- Golden-headed lion tamarins
- Pygmy marmosets
- Azara's agoutis
- Patagonian mara
- Cape porcupines
- Pottos
- Three-banded armadillos
- Northern Luzon giant cloud rats
- Sitatungas
- African spurred tortoises
- Aldabra giant tortoises
- Red-footed tortoises
- Chinese crocodile lizard
- Emerald tree monitor
- Rhinoceros ratsnake
- Saharan uromastyx
- Solomon Islands skinks
- Curly-tailed lizards
- Jamaican boas
- African sacred ibis
- Blue cranes
- Reeves's pheasants
- Greater rheas

=== Red pandas ===
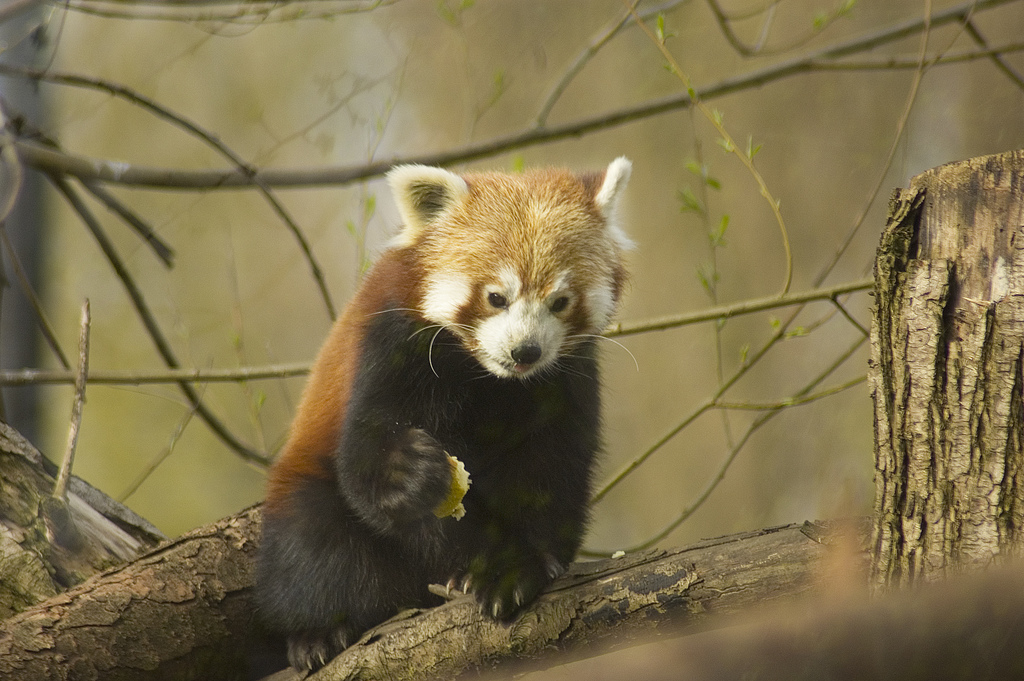
A red panda at the centre

The nature centre used to have a pair of male red pandas. However these have been re-housed as part of the national breeding programme. Ming Ming is visiting a female red panda in the Welsh Mountain Zoo.

Babu is a red panda who escaped twice in less than four days from the nature centre in late 2005. He was found in a neighboring garden less than a day after his first escape and was on the loose for four days after his second. Nature centre staff believe he was blown out of a tree or had leapt to another tree when exhibit trees were swaying from wind. His second disappearance and the citywide panda hunt that ensued made national headlines. After being discovered in a tree, Babu was reunited with his brother Tensing live on Midlands Today.
