= 2015 Sousse attacks =

Mass shooting at a Tunisian tourist resort on 26 June 2015

2015 Sousse attack
- Part of the 26 June 2015 Islamist attacks and the Islamic State insurgency in Tunisia
- Location: 35°54′43.52″N 10°34′48.1″E; Riu Imperial Marhaba and Soviva, Port El Kantaoui, Sousse, Tunisia
- Date: 26 June 2015 c. 11:45 a.m.-12:15 p.m. (GMT+1)
- Target: European tourists staying at a hotel
- Weapons: AK-47 assault rifle, grenades
- Deaths: 39 (including the perpetrator)
- Injuries: 39
- Perpetrator: Islamic State
- Assailant: Seifeddine Rezgui Yacoubi

On 26 June 2015, a mass shooting occurred at the tourist resort at Port El Kantaoui, about 10 kilometres north of the city of Sousse, Tunisia. 38 people, 30 of whom were British, were killed when a gunman, Seifeddine Rezgui, attacked a hotel. It was the deadliest non-state attack in the history of modern Tunisia, with more fatalities than the 22 killed in the Bardo National Museum attack three months before. The attack received widespread condemnation around the world. The Tunisian government later "acknowledged fault" for slow police response to the attack.

== Background ==
In October 2013, a suicide bomber blew himself up in a botched attack on a Sousse beach while security forces foiled another planned attack nearby. The post-Tunisian revolution led to the 2014 parliamentary election in which the principal secularist party gained a plurality but was unable to govern alone, and ultimately formed a national unity government. Secularist Beji Caid Essebsi was elected president in the 2014 Tunisian presidential election. After the overthrow of Tunisian president Ben Ali, terrorism increased, leading to 60 victims among security and military troops. Other attacks targeted civilians and tourists. Despite this, Tunisia was considered to be a secure country.

On 18 March 2015, the Bardo National Museum in Tunis was attacked by three terrorists, in which 21 foreigners visiting the museum and a local police officer were killed. Two of the gunmen, Tunisian citizens Yassine Labidi and Saber Khachnaoui, were killed by police, while the third attacker escaped. Police treated the event as a terrorist attack. The Islamic State (IS) claimed responsibility for the attack, and threatened to commit further attacks. However, the Tunisian government blamed a local splinter group of al-Qaeda in the Islamic Maghreb, called the Okba Ibn Nafaa Brigade, for the attack. A police raid killed nine members on 28 March. After the Bardo attack, the government announced new security measures and declared the country safe again.

== Attack ==
On 26 June 2015 the Spanish-owned five-star Riu Imperial Marhaba Hotel at Port El Kantaoui, a tourist complex situated on the coast about ten kilometres north of Sousse, Tunisia, was hosting 565 guests, mainly from Western Europe, 77% of its capacity. Tourists from the hotel as well as from the Soviva Hotel located nearby were relaxing on the beach.

At around noon, Seifeddine Rezgui Yacoubi, disguised as a tourist, socialised with others, and then took out a Kalashnikov assault rifle concealed in a beach umbrella and fired at the tourists on the beach. He then entered the hotel, shooting at people he came across, while also reportedly throwing grenades. He was killed by security forces during an exchange of fire. His autopsy later revealed that he had medications and an illegal drug in his system. All bullets were found to have been fired from the one weapon; the attacker had four magazines of ammunition. The attacker had spoken to his father on a mobile telephone which he then threw into the sea during the attack; it was retrieved later.

An Interior Ministry spokesman said that they were sure that others assisted but did not participate directly, providing the Kalashnikov and helping get Rezgui to the scene.

=== Victims ===
Nationality	Deaths	Wounded	Total	Ref.
United Kingdom	30	26	56	
Republic of Ireland	3	0	3	
Germany	2	1	3	
Belgium	1	3	4	
Russia	1	1	2	
Portugal	1	0	1	
Tunisia	0	7	7	
Ukraine	0	1	1	
Total	38	39	77	

38 people were killed, 30 of whom were British. Among the fatalities was Denis Thwaites, a former professional footballer for Birmingham City, and his wife, Elaine. Victims also included people from three generations of one family: Adrian Evans, Patrick Evans and Joel Richards.

39 people were also wounded.

== Perpetrator and associates ==
The killer, Seifiddine Rezgui Yacoubi, also known as Abu Yahya al-Qayrawani, (29 August 1992 – 26 June 2015) was a 22-year-old electrical engineering student at University of Kairouan from Gaâfour, in northwest Tunisia. He did not have the typical traits of an Islamic extremist: he had a girlfriend, drank alcohol and was locally known as a skilled break-dancer. He was also believed to be high on cocaine during his rampage. He is believed to have been radicalized over such issues as the Libyan Civil War and Western inaction against the Assad government during the Syrian Civil War.

Rezgui is thought to have been recruited by Ajnad al-Khilafah, an outgrowth of the Tunisian branch of Ansar al-Sharia, which was founded by Seifallah Ben Hassine, who had lived in the UK in the 1990s and whose mentor during that time was Abu Qatada. High Court papers relating to a control order placed on a British-based suspect state that Ben Hassine "aimed to recruit new members and send them to Afghanistan for training". The control order documents add that: "Abu Qatada appears as a watermark running through the whole of this case as being the mastermind."

After the overthrow of Tunisia's President Zine el-Abedine Ben Ali, Ben Hassine was released from jail in March 2011 under an amnesty, and later founded Ansar al-Sharia in Tunisia, which resisted proscription until 2013, arguing it was carrying out humanitarian work. This was despite Ben Hassine’s personal involvement in an attack on the US Embassy in Tunis on 14 September 2012, three days after Ansar's Libyan counterparts killed US ambassador J. Christopher Stevens in Benghazi, Libya. When Ansar al-Sharia was finally outlawed in August 2013, after the murders of two secular leftist MPs, he was listed as a proscribed terrorist by the United States, and fled to Libya. Ben Hassine was reportedly killed by the USAF near Adjabiya in eastern Libya on 14 June 2015, in a strike designed to kill Mokhtar Belmokhtar.

Qatada wrote in a letter published online in January 2014 that Ben Hassine "is among the best of those I have known in intellect" and "the most knowledgeable of people of my intentions ... for he was the closest of people to me".

In January 2017, documents obtained by Panorama identified Chamseddine al-Sandi as the orchestrator behind the attack. He is named in confessions from suspects who were arrested in connection with the shootings. Rezgui was killed at the scene, but the documents obtained by Panorama say that he was recruited and directed by al-Sandi. The confessions say al-Sandi ran a militant cell responsible for both the Sousse shootings and the attack three months earlier at the Bardo National Museum in which 22 people died. Both attacks were claimed by the Islamic State.

== Aftermath ==
Immediately after the attack, the flight JAF5017, on its way to Enfidha-Hammamet International Airport, was redirected to Brussels. German tour operator TUI offered German tourists the opportunity to fly back to Germany and to cancel or adjust their bookings in Tunisia. British tour operator Thomson announced that flights to Tunisia would be cancelled until at least 9 July 2015, with ten flights departing on the evening of the attacks to bring 2,500 customers in the resort back to the United Kingdom. EasyJet and Thomas Cook announced that customers planning to visit Tunisia would be able to change their travel plans free of charge.

Hotels were targeted in attacks to undermine tourism and because they were considered "brothels" by IS. Both tourism and the related industries accounted for up to 14.9% of the Tunisian economy in 2014.

The United Kingdom's Home Secretary Theresa May and Foreign Office Minister Tobias Ellwood visited the site of the shooting on 29 June 2015. It was also announced that a Royal Air Force aircraft would be sent to repatriate bodies and evacuate the injured back to the UK. On 29 June an RAF Boeing C-17 Globemaster III flew from RAF Brize Norton to Tunisia to recover four British victims, with the C17 returning via Birmingham Airport to unload one patient, and returning to Brize Norton with the other three.

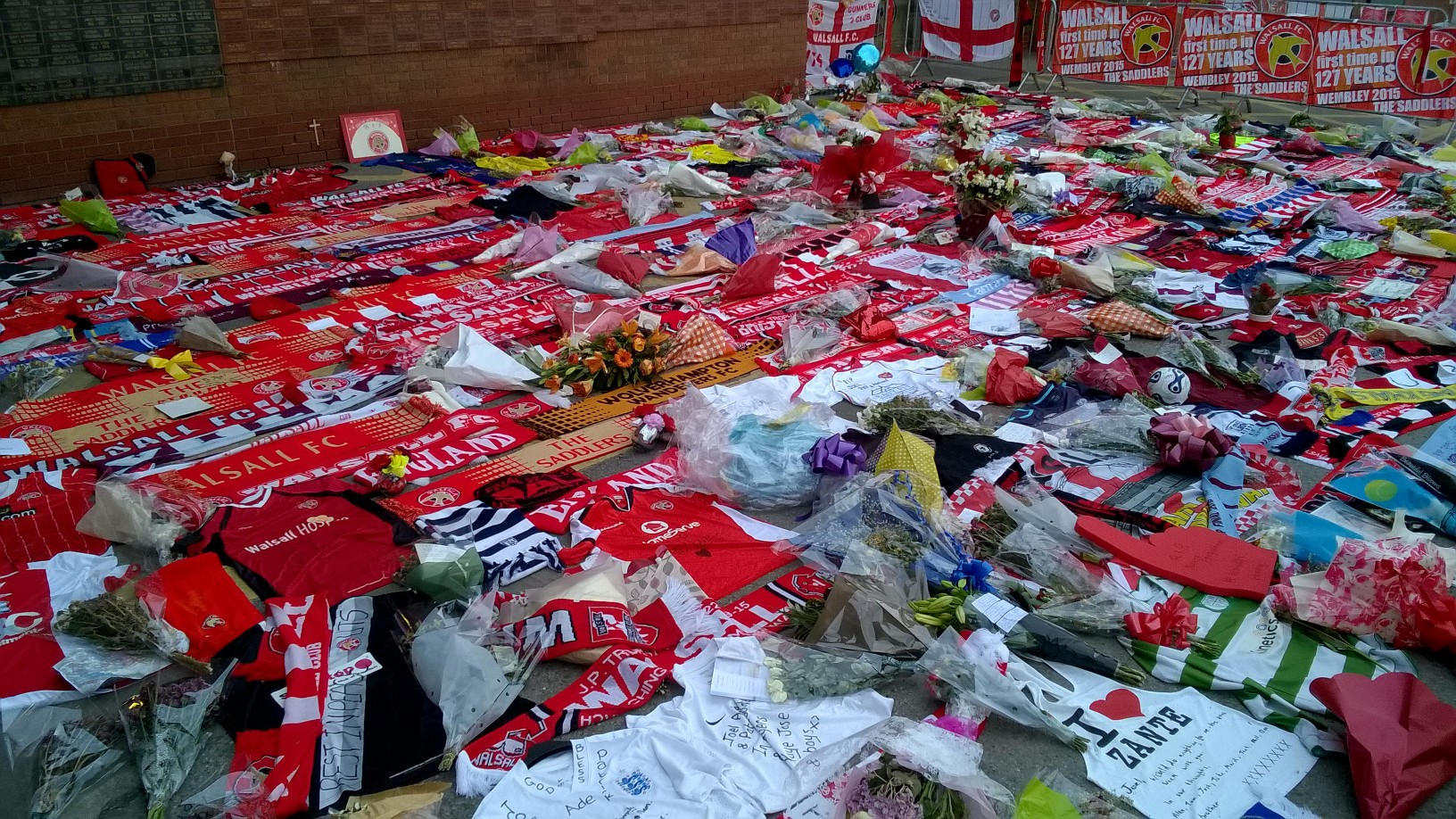
Football scarves and shirts were laid as a tribute outside Bescot Stadium, home of Walsall F.C., the team which three of the British victims supported.

On 29 June, the House of Commons chamber observed a minute of silence shortly before the UK Prime Minister, David Cameron, announced that a national minute of silence would be held on 3 July 2015 at 12:00 local time to remember the victims, exactly one week on from the attacks. Cameron later led several COBRA meetings. The Foreign Office sent a team to the hotel to support British survivors and learn more about the British victims. The Metropolitan Police Deputy Assistant Commissioner announced a heightened police presence and security for Armed Forces Day and Pride London events taking place in London over the weekend. On 28 June 2015, the Queen said she and the Duke of Edinburgh were shocked by the attack and offered their deepest sympathy to the injured. Sixteen British counter-terrorism police were deployed to Tunisia in the direct aftermath of the attacks, and almost 400 officers were sent to British airports to identify potential witnesses to the attack who had returned home.

Between 1 and 4 July the bodies of all thirty British nationals killed in the attacks were flown from Tunisia to RAF Brize Norton. On 2 July David Cameron and Defence Secretary Michael Fallon began making calls for airstrikes in Syria, believing the Sousse attacks to have been coordinated from there. On 3 July, the UK held a nationwide minute's silence at 12:00 local time to remember the victims of the attacks as government buildings and Buckingham Palace flew the Union Jack at half-mast.

Two British tourists, Allen Pembroke and Paul Short, were awarded the Queen's Commendation for Bravery in the 2017 Birthday Honours for aiding victims of the attack while it was still underway.

An inquest to the attack was initially scheduled to start in November 2016 but was postponed to 2017. On 16 January 2017, the first hearing of the inquest was held in the Royal Courts of Justice in London. The inquest found that the police response to the Tunisia Beach Attacks was "at best shambolic and at worst cowardly" after officers in the vicinity were found to be hiding or running in the opposite direction to the attacker. A security team close to the attack and armed with assault rifles and wearing protective vests, retreated to wait for reinforcements for a half an hour, during which time the lone gunman killed the 38 victims.

By March 2017, at least six police officers were referred to trial for criminal negligence for failing to help the victims, and 27 others were referred on similar charges, according to the Tunisian Justice Ministry.

A coroner at the inquest ruled that the victims of the attacks were "unlawfully killed" prompting the relatives of British victims to take legal action against tour operator TUI.

Law firm Irwin Mitchell represented 85 families affected by the attack, who amongst them had lost 22 family members. Of the families represented, 63 Britons were injured, some suffering life changing injuries from gunshot and shrapnel wounds.

The trial, involving more than 50 witnesses and experts, was heard in private due to the evidence being considered sensitive for security reasons. In a joint statement, a spokesperson for Irwin Mitchell and tour operator TUI announced a settlement had been reached. The settlement was reached “without admission of liability or fault and in recognition of the wholly exceptional circumstances of the case”.

== Reactions ==
Tunisian president Beji Caid Essebsi called for a global strategy against terrorism and visited Sousse with Prime Minister Habib Essid, who promised to close 80 mosques within the week. The government also planned to crack down on financing for certain associations as a countermeasure against another attack. Essid announced new anti-terrorism measures, including the deployment of reserve troops to reinforce security at "sensitive sites ... and places that could be targets of terrorist attacks." The "exceptional plan to better secure tourist and archaeological sites" will include "deploying armed tourist security officers all along the coast and inside hotels from 1 July," and that:

The country is under threat; the government is under threat. Without the cooperation of everyone and a show of unity, we cannot win this war. We have won some battles and lost others, but our objective is to win the war... Some mosques continue to spread their propaganda and their venom to promote terrorism. No mosque that does not conform to the law will be tolerated.

Beji Caid Essebsi also denounced the "cowardly" attacks, promising "painful but necessary" measures to fight extremism in the country. He called for a firm response: "No country is safe from terrorism, and we need a global strategy of all democratic countries."

On 4 July, Essebsi removed from his post the provincial Governor of Sousse and at least five senior police officers. Among the policemen dismissed were three from Sousse, one from Gaafour (the home city of Rezgui) and one from Kairouan, where Rezgui was studying.

On 22 July, Tunisian MPs began a three-day debate on new counter-terrorism legislation. The legislation would allow the courts to impose death sentences to those convicted of terrorism-related offences. The legislation would also make public support of terrorism a jailable offence. If passed, the bill would allow law enforcement and security services to tap phone calls of individuals suspected of terrorism.

On 8 July, the British Foreign and Commonwealth Office changed the advised status of Tunisia to "Advise against all but essential travel", resulting, from 9 July, in the planned return home of the estimated 3,000 British nationals in Tunisia at that time. ABTA and travel organisations First Choice, TUI and Thomson have stated that they planned to send no further British tourists to Tunisia until after 31 October 2015.

== Memorials ==
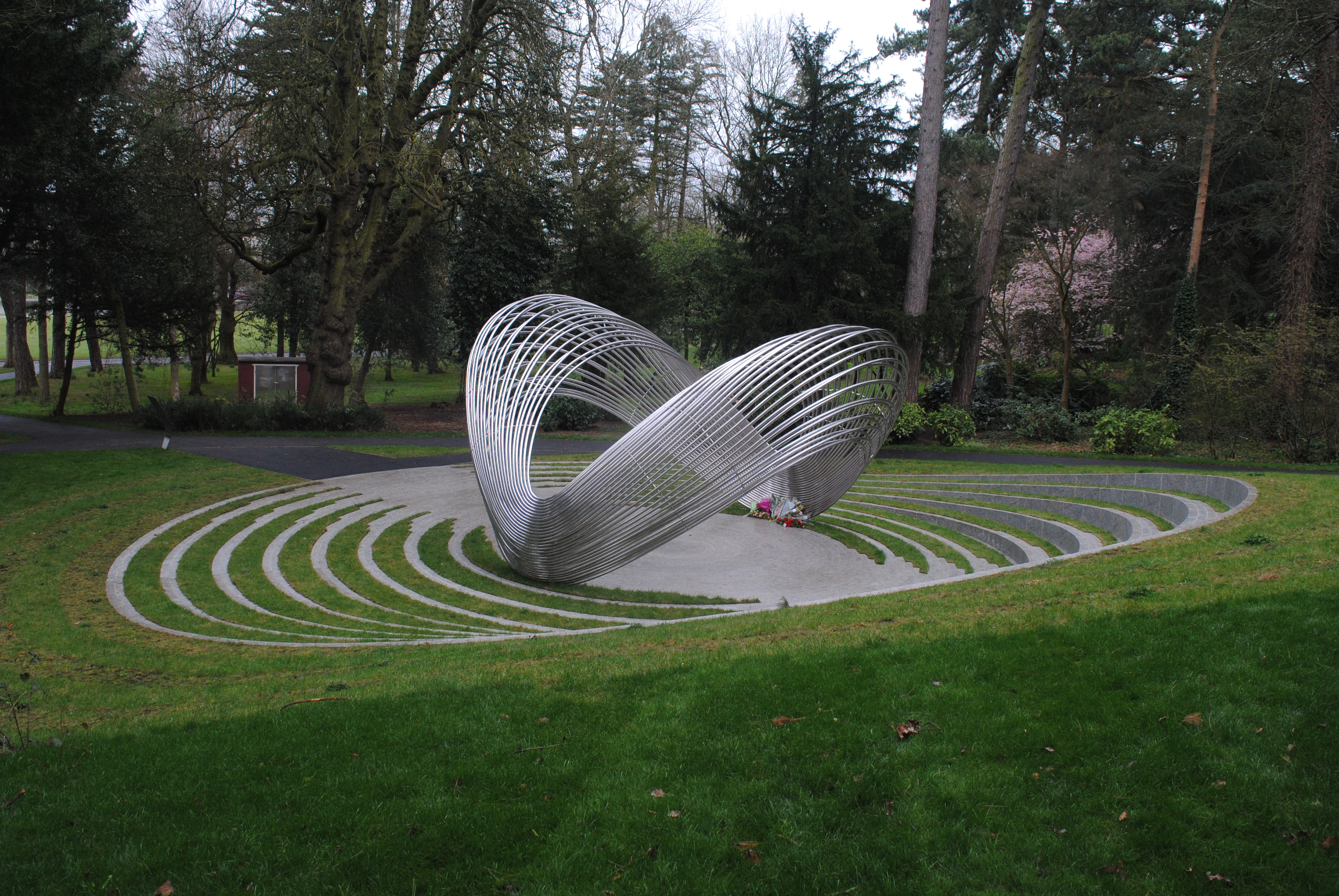
Infinite Wave Memorial, Birmingham, England.

On 4 March 2019, a memorial to the British victims, and a victim of the Bardo attack, called Infinite Wave, was unveiled in Cannon Hill Park, Birmingham, by Prince Harry, Duke of Sussex.

== Other Islamist attacks ==
Four other Islamist attacks took place on the same day in France, Kuwait, Syria and Somalia. The attacks followed an audio message released three days earlier by IS senior leader Abu Mohammad al-Adnani encouraging militants everywhere to attack during the month of Ramadan. No definitive link between the attacks has yet been established. One attack, at a French factory, resulted in the beheading of one person; another bombing at a Shia mosque in Kuwait City killed at least 27; and the other attack on an African Union base in Somalia undertaken by Al-Shabaab, killed at least 70.

== See also ==
- List of rampage killers (religious, political, or ethnic crimes)
- List of Islamist terrorist attacks
- List of terrorist incidents in 2015
- List of terrorist incidents in Tunisia
