= Infinite Wave =

Stainless steel sculpture in Birmingham, West Midlands

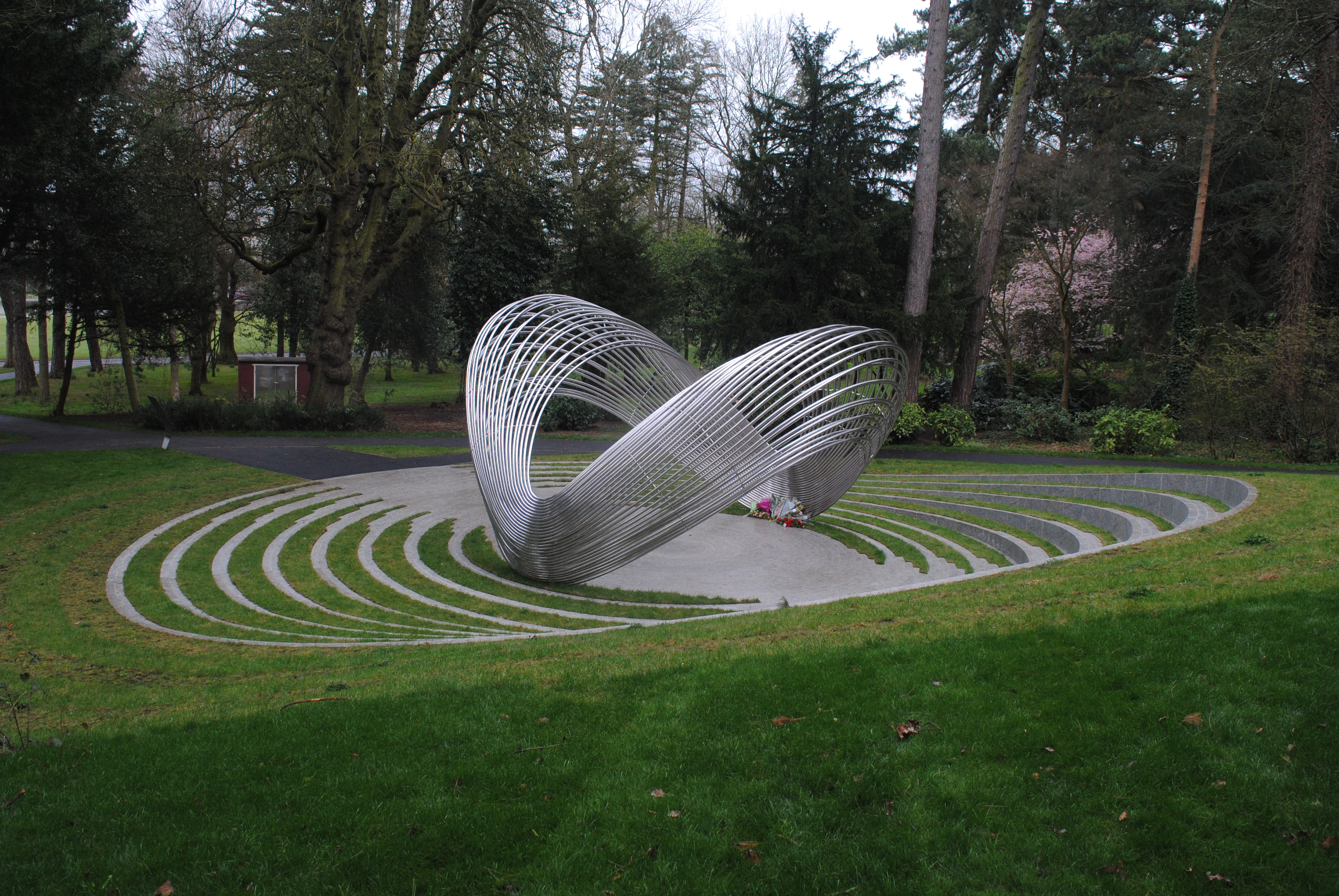
- Infinite Wave in March 2019, a few days after its unveiling
- Artist: George King Architects
- Completion date: 2019
- Type: Sculpture
- Location: Cannon Hill Park, Birmingham, England
- 52.449438°N 1.903875°W

Infinite Wave is a permanent memorial located in Cannon Hill Park, Birmingham, England, dedicated to the 31 British victims of the 2015 Sousse and Bardo terrorist attacks. Commissioned by the Foreign and Commonwealth Office, it was designed by George King Architects and unveiled on 4 March 2019 by the Duke of Sussex.

The memorial is formed of 31 separate metal streams, representing each of the victims of the attacks, which loop back on one another, forming one single wave. The sculpture took four months to complete and was fabricated from 316 stainless steel tubes. The names of the victims are inscribed on the streams and placed inside each stream are written messages to the victims from their friends and families.
