= Ward End Park =

Park in Ward End, Birmingham, England

Ward End Park 1
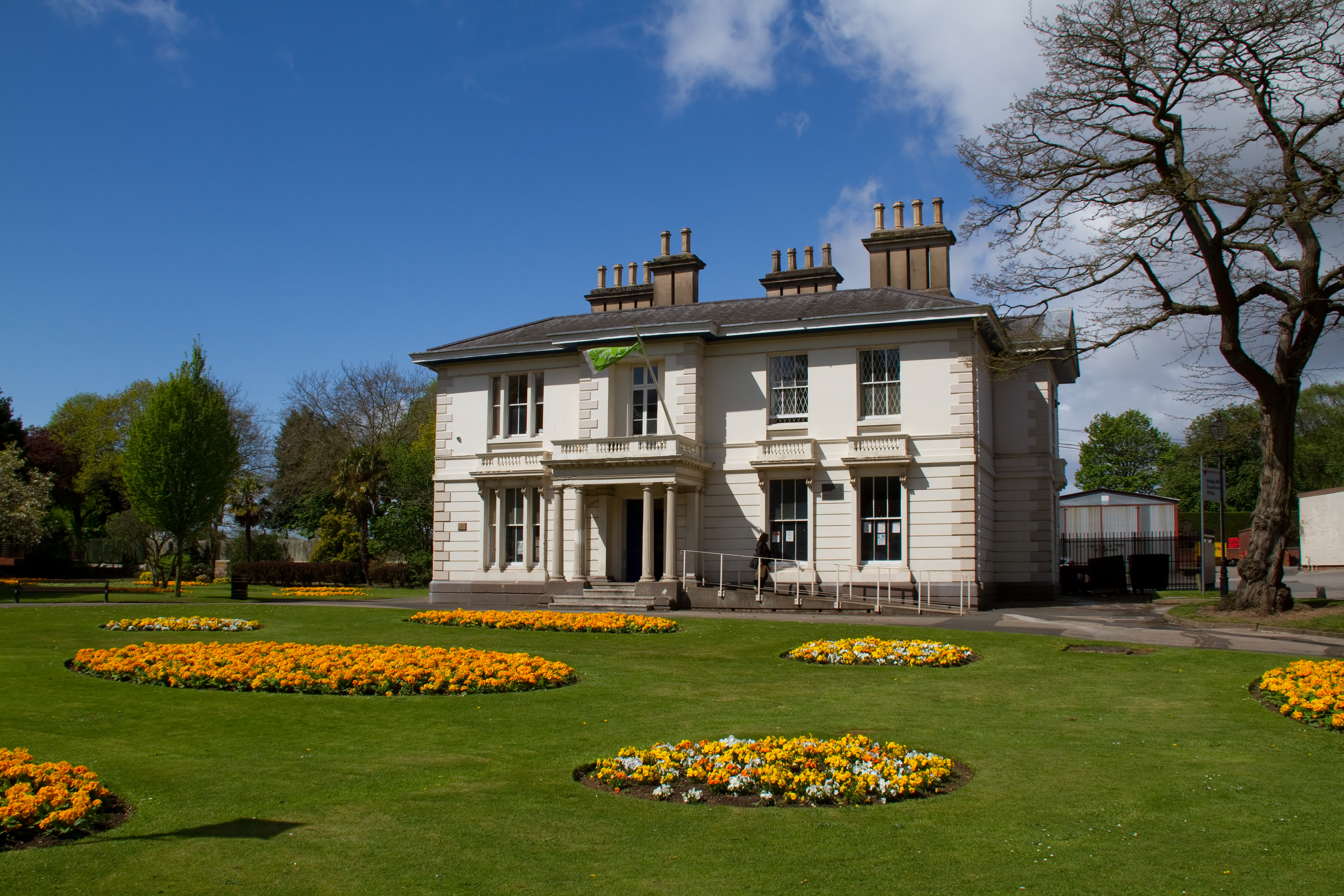
- Ward End Park House
- Interactive map of Ward End Park 1
- Type: public
- Location: Ward End, Birmingham, UK
- Coordinates: 52°29′35″N 1°50′20″W
- Area: 54 acres (22 ha)
- Created: 1904
- Operator: Birmingham City Council
- Awards: Green Flag

Ward End Park is a Green Flag awarded public park located in Ward End, Birmingham.

The park covers an area of 54 acres and contains a historic mansion, the 18th century Ward End Park House.

Facilities include a fishing and boating lake, a basketball court and a tennis court.
