= Cannon Hill Park =

Public park in Birmingham, England

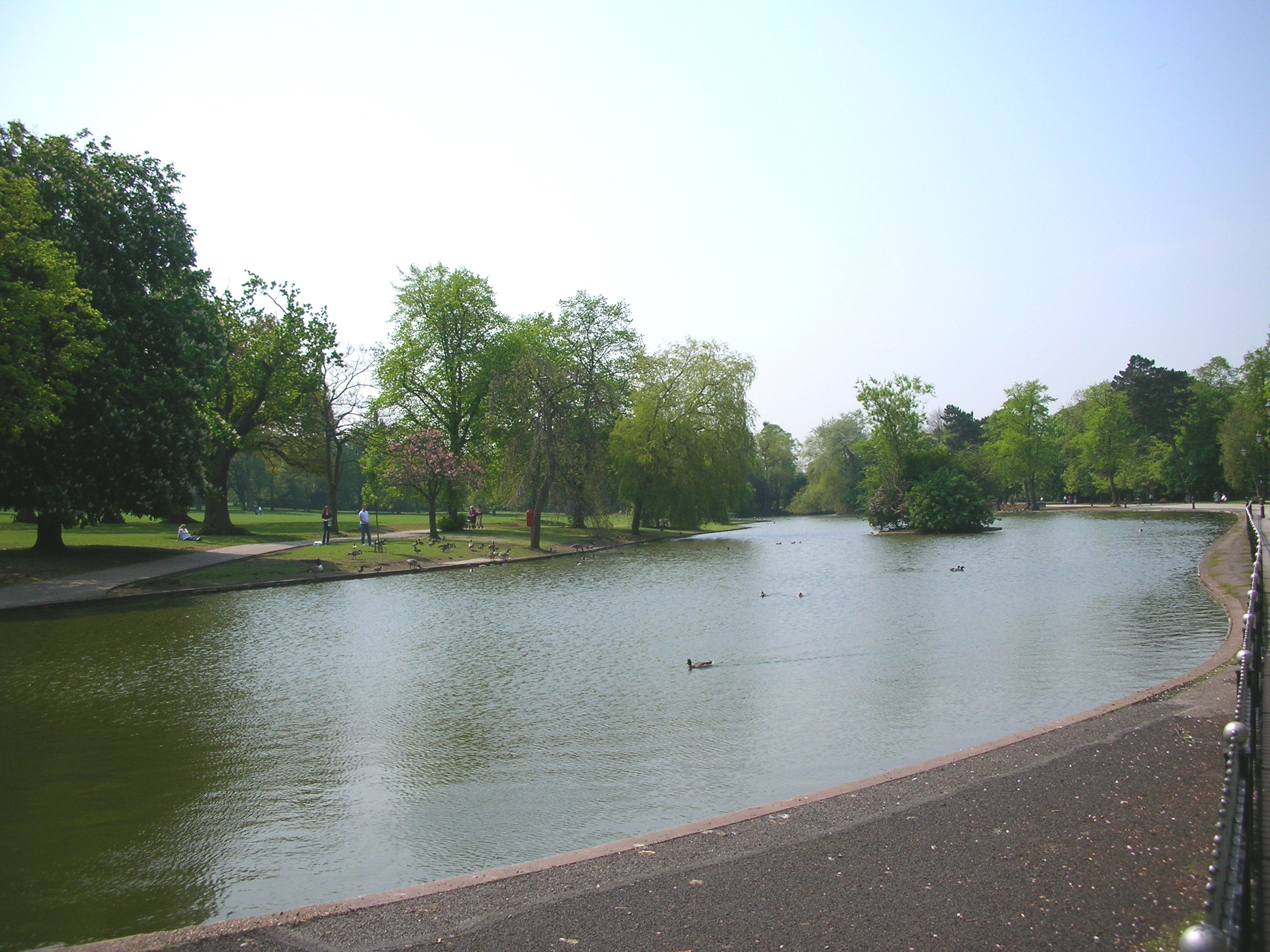
- Cannon Hill Park boating lake
- Interactive map of Cannon Hill Park
- Type: Public park
- Location: Birmingham, England
- Coordinates: 52°27′11″N 1°54′04″W
- Operator: Birmingham City Council
- Status: Open year round
- Website: birmingham.gov.uk/cannonhillpark

Cannon Hill Park is a park located in Moseley, a suburb in south Birmingham, England. It is the most popular park in the city, covering 250 acres (101 ha) consisting of formal, conservation, woodland and sports areas. Recreational activities at the park include boating, fishing, bowls, tennis, putting, and picnic areas.

The park is also home to MAC (formerly Midlands Arts Centre), opened in 1962 on the site of the park's lido. Directly adjacent to Canon Hill, on the other side of the Rea, is Birmingham Wildlife Conservation Park (BWCP). Also on the other side of the river (and across the B4217) is Edgbaston Cricket Ground.

== History ==
On 18 April 1873, a local benefactor, Miss Louisa Ann Ryland (1814–89) of Barford Hill House, Warwickshire, gave just over 57 acres (23 ha) of meadow land, known as Cannon Hill Fields, to the Corporation and paid for the draining of the site to create a public park. J.T Gibson of Battersea was employed to transform the site. He constructed two large lakes, the smaller ornamental ponds and a bathing pool. 35 acres were devoted to ornamental gardens and shrub borders. Kew Gardens donated seeds and plants to establish the collection, this collection was used by students to enable them to study botany.

The park was opened to the public in September 1873. A further 7 acres (2.8 ha) were given by the brewer John Holder in 1897 which was inaugurated to mark the Diamond Jubilee of Queen Victoria. In 1898, 5 acres (2.0 ha) were acquired to straighten the River Rea, which now runs through an open culvert along the western edge. This part of the river formed the settlement and county boundary between Moseley, Worcestershire, and Edgbaston, Warwickshire.

== Features ==
=== Listed features ===
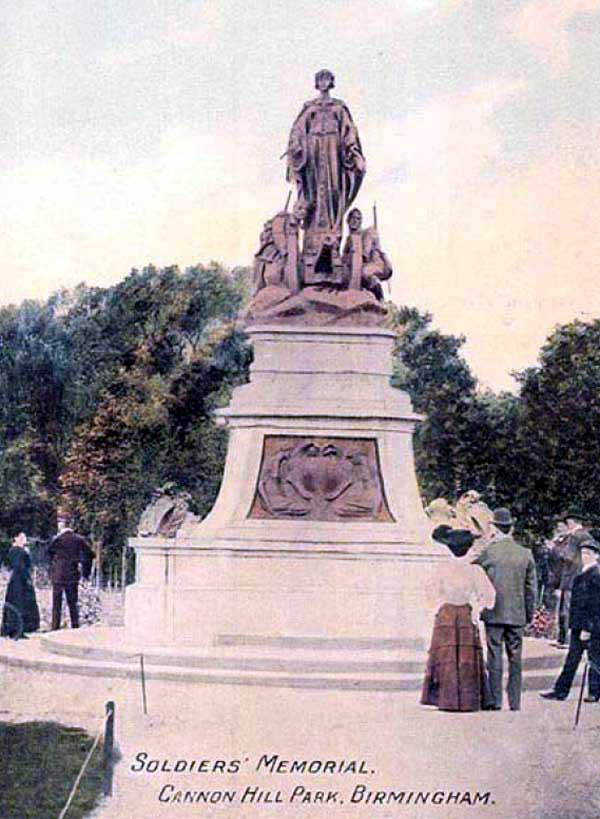
Boer War memorial

A 1906 granite and bronze memorial to the dead of the Second Boer War by Albert Toft, stands in the middle of the northwest circuit path of the park. Grade II* listed, it was refurbished in 2012.

In 1911 a 16th-century timbered house, known as the Golden Lion Inn, was moved from Deritend and re-erected in the park by the Birmingham Archaeological Society, to serve as a refreshment room and cricket pavilion. It is a Grade II listed building, but is now in a very poor state of repair and fenced-off. Restoration work began in 2025.

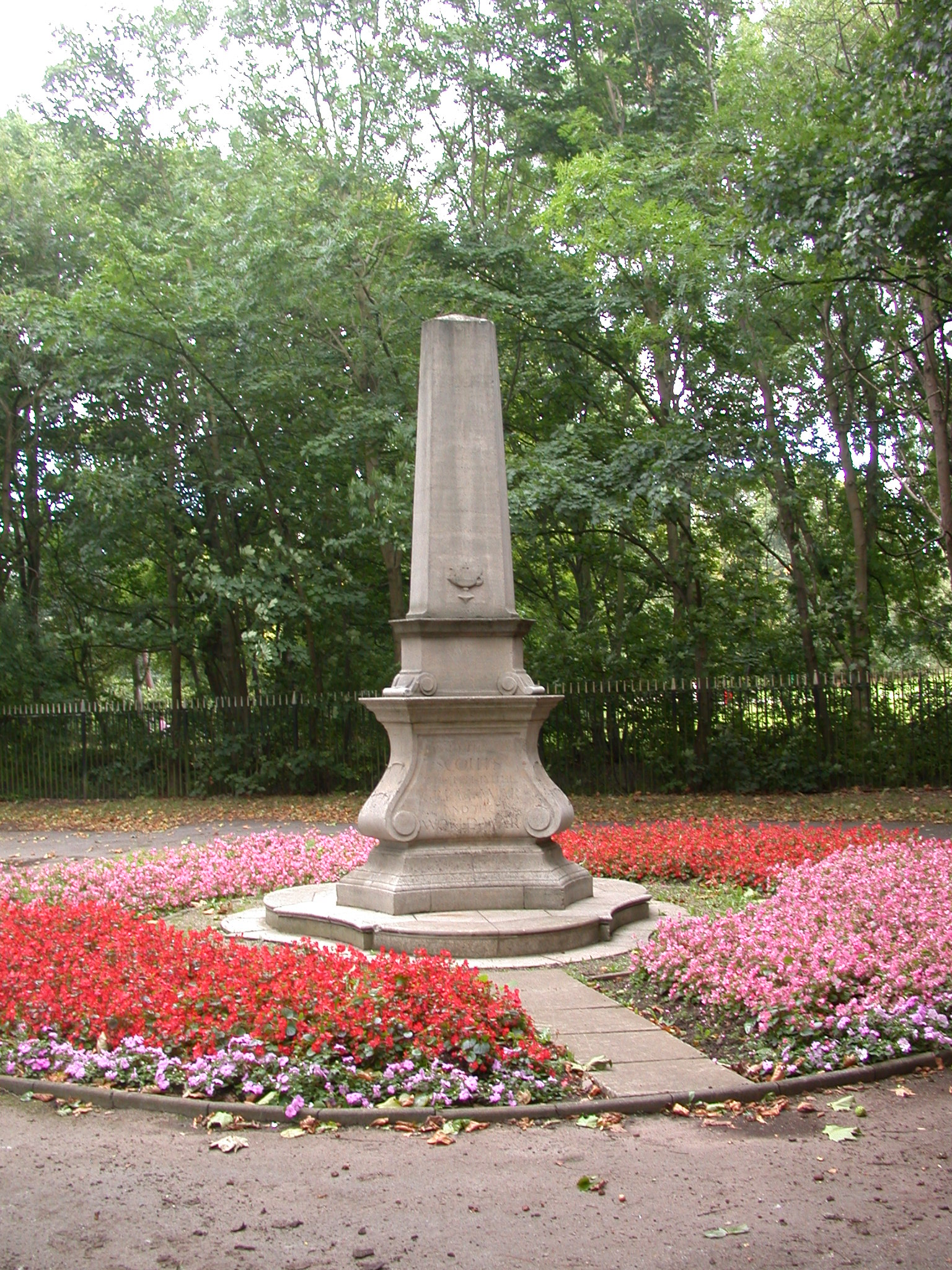
The Scout memorial

On the access road Queens Ride, between Canon Hill and BWCP, sits another memorial. Unveiled on 27 July 1924, it commemorates Scouts who fell in the First and (by later inscription) Second World Wars. Grade II listed in 2016, it is made of concrete and was designed by the architect William Haywood.

The park's bandstand, the brick bridge over the boating lake (Red Carriage Bridge), and Cannon Hill House are also Grade II Listed.

The park itself was Grade II* listed in 2001.

=== Other assets ===
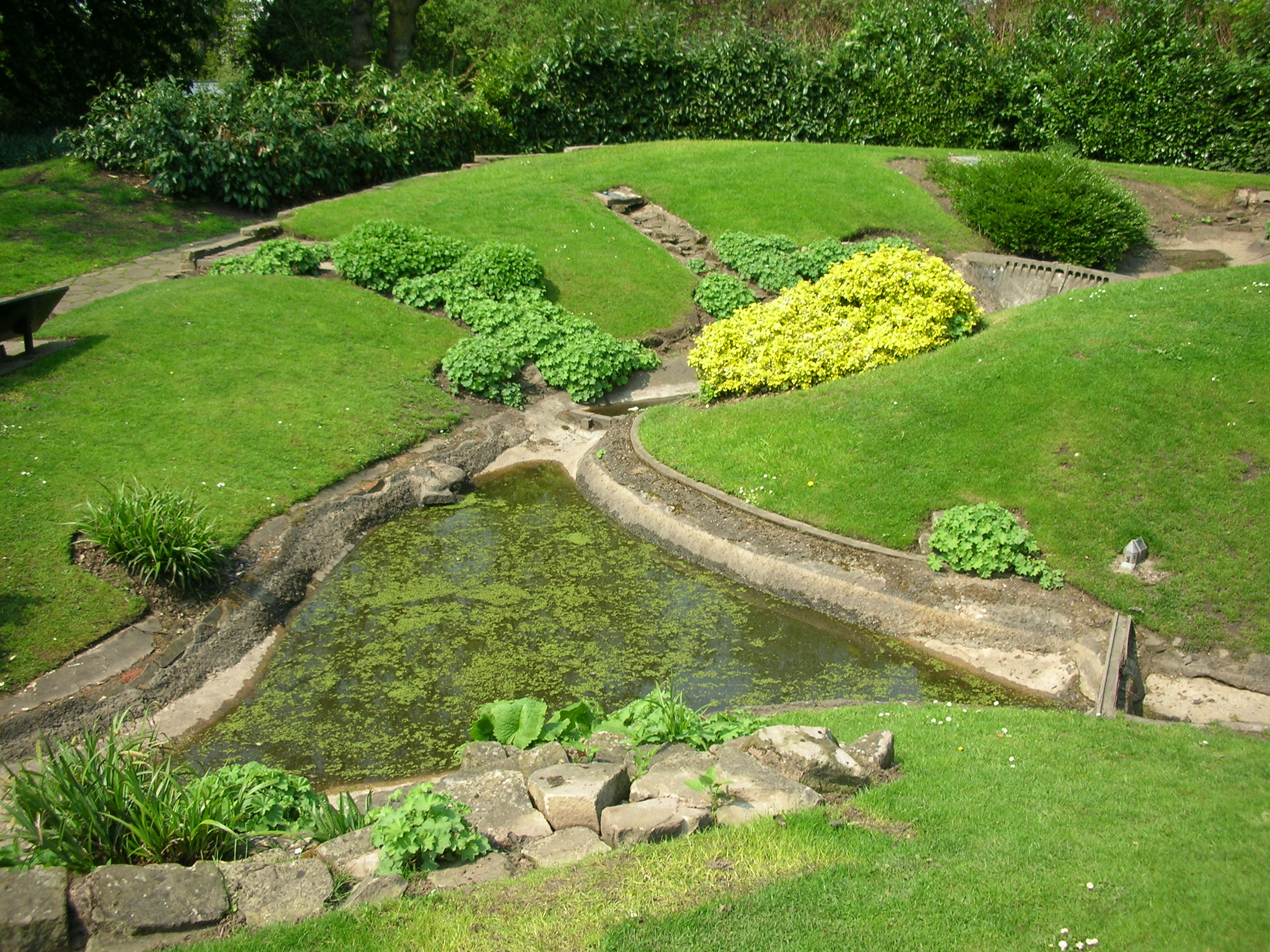
Elan Valley Reservoirs - model in Cannon Hill Park

A scale model of the Elan Valley Reservoirs, in the form of ornamental ponds, is located in a Japanese garden near the Edgbaston Road (B4217). It was built in 1962.

On 4 March 2019, a memorial to the British victim of the 2015 Bardo National Museum attack, and 30 British victims of the 2015 Sousse attacks, in Tunisia, was unveiled by Prince Harry, Duke of Sussex. The memorial is called Infinite Wave.

== Events ==
A free 5 kilometre parkrun running event is held in the park every Saturday morning at 9 am and usually attracts over 750 runners each week. A free 2 kilometre junior parkrun event for children aged between 4 and 14 takes place at 9 am on Sunday mornings.

The Great Birmingham 10k and Great Birmingham Run half-marathon events also pass through the park.
