= Barzan-class fast attack craft =

Class of missile boats of the Qatari Navy

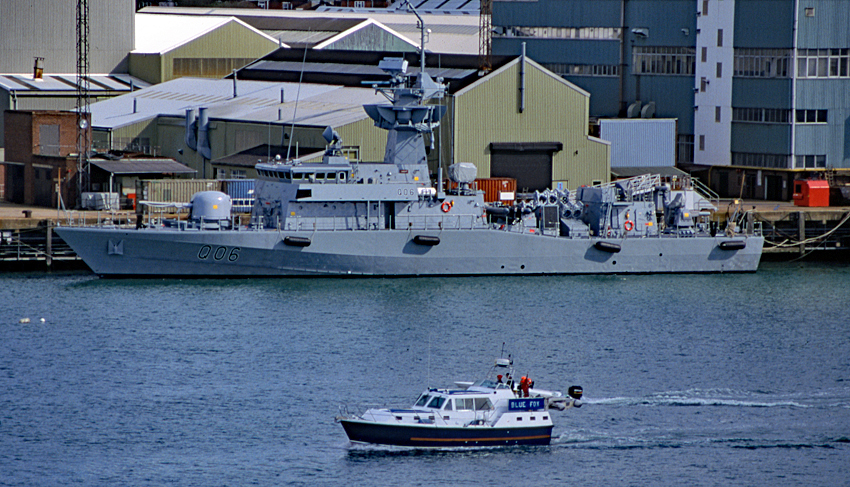
- 006 Al Udeid fitting out at VTS Woolston

Class overview
- Name: Barzan, Super Vita
- Builders: Vosper Thornycroft
- Operators: Qatari Emiri Navy
- Preceded by: La Comabattante III
- In commission: 1996 - present day
- Planned: 4
- Completed: 4
- Active: 4

General characteristics
- Type: FACM
- Displacement: Standard: 380 t (370 long tons; 420 short tons); Full load: 530 t (520 long tons; 580 short tons)
- Length: 62 m (203 ft)
- Beam: 9.5 m (31 ft)
- Draught: 2.6 m (8 ft 6 in)
- Installed power: 4 × MTU 16V595 TE90 diesel engines 17,500 kW (23,500 hp)
- Propulsion: 4 propellers
- Speed: 35 knots (65 km/h; 40 mph)
- Range: 1,800 miles (2,900 km) @ 12 kn (22 km/h; 14 mph)
- Complement: 35
- Sensors & processing systems: Thales MW08 3D G-band surveillance radar; Thales Mirador electro-optical target tracker; Thales Scout MkII low probability of intercept radar; Sperry Marine Bridgemaster-E navigation radar; Tacticos combat management system; Aeromaritime IFF Mk12; ICS 2000 integrated communications system
- Electronic warfare & decoys: DR 3000 ESM system; Argo AR 900 ESM system; 1 SRBOC decoy launcher
- Armament: 1 x OTO Melara 76mm; 1 x 30mm Goalkeeper; 2 x Exocet MM40 Block 3 anti-ship missiles; 1 x Mistral 6-cell launcher

The Barzan class is a class of 4 British-designed fast attack missile boats for the Qatari Emiri Navy, also known as Super Vita.

== History ==
The Barzan class was ordered by the Qatari Emiri Navy in 1992. Vosper Thornycroft was chosen to build the 4 ships of the class. The 4 ship’s names are QENS Barzan, QENS Huwar, QENS Al Udied and QENS Al Deebeel.

Barzan and Huwar were the first batch to arrive in Qatar in 1996 while Al Udied and Al Deebel arrived as the second batch in 1998.

== Design ==
The craft are developments of the VT 56m patrol boats delivered to the Kenyan and Omani navies. The hull is made of steel and the superstructure is made of aluminium, while Vosper Thornycroft, now BAE Systems Surface Ships, provided the electricity transmission system, the management board, electrical equipment and countermeasure systems.

== Ships ==
Pennant number	Name	Builder	Commissioned	Status
004	Barzan برزان	Vosper Thornycroft	1996	Active
005	Huwar حوار	Vosper Thornycroft	1996	Active
006	Al Udied العديد	Vosper Thornycroft	1998	Active
007	Al Deebeel الدبل	Vosper Thornycroft	1998	Active
