= Q61 =

Q61 may refer to:

- Q61 (New York City bus)
- ARA Ciudad de Zarate (Q-61), an auxiliary ship of the Argentine Navy
- As-Saff, the 61st surah of the Quran
- Georgetown Airport (California), in El Dorado County, California, United States
- QENS Musherib (Q61), a patrol vessel of the Qatari Emiri Navy
