= Inspector General of the Armed Forces (Tunisia) =

Senior military oversight office in Tunisia

Inspector General of the Armed Forces of Tunisia
- المفتش العام للقوات المسلحة; Inspecteur général des forces armées
- Incumbent; Major General Lamjed Hammami since 15 June 2023
- General Inspectorate of the Armed Forces; Ministry of National Defense
- Reports to: Minister of National Defense; President of Tunisia
- Appointer: President of Tunisia

The Inspector General of the Armed Forces (Arabic: المفتش العام للقوات المسلحة; French: Inspecteur général des forces armées) is a senior military official within Tunisia's Ministry of National Defense responsible for overseeing operational readiness and governance across the Tunisian Armed Forces. The position exists within the context of a divided operational command among the separate chiefs of staff of the Tunisian Army, Tunisian Air Force, and Tunisian Navy, with the Inspector General serving as the highest-ranking joint-service position in Tunisia. The Inspector General is appointed by presidential decree and is formally installed by the Minister of National Defense. The post is typically held by a general or flag officer holding the rank of Brigadier General or Rear Admiral from any of the three military branches.

== List of officeholders ==
No.	Portrait	Name (born–died)	Term of office			Ref.
No.	Portrait	Name (born–died)	Took office	Left office	Time in office	Ref.
		Brigadier General; Mohamed Ali Bekri (?–?)	September 2011	May 2013	1 year, 8 months	
		Major General; Taïeb Laâjimi (?–?)	May 2013	August 2013	3 months	
		Brigadier General; Mohamed Nafti (?–?)	August 2013	February 2015	1 year, 6 months	
		Brigadier General; Mohamed Foued Aloui (?–?)	20 February 2015	31 August 2015	192 days	
		Brigadier General; Jamel Boujeh (?–?)	1 September 2015	31 July 2017	1 year, 334 days	
		Major General; Abdelmonaam Belaati (?–?)	1 August 2017	30 January 2023	5 years, 182 days	
		Major General; Lamjed Hammami (?–?)	15 June 2023	Incumbent	3 years, 160 days	

== See also ==
- Tunisian Armed Forces
- Ministry of Defence (Tunisia)
- Military ranks of Tunisia
