= NNS Ekpe =

History

Nigeria
- Name: Ekpe
- Builder: Lurssen
- Laid down: 17 February 1979
- Launched: 17 December 1979
- In service: 1980-2010s
- Home port: Western Naval Command Lagos, Nigeria
- Status: Inactive

General characteristics
- Class & type: Ekpe-class fast attack craft
- Displacement: 373 t (367 long tons)
- Length: 58.1 m (190 ft 7 in)
- Beam: 7.62 m (25 ft 0 in)
- Draft: 2.83 m (9 ft 3 in)
- Propulsion: 4 × MTU diesel engines
- Range: 2,600 nmi (4,800 km; 3,000 mi)
- Complement: 40
- Sensors & processing systems: Decca 1226C radar; WM-28 radar
- Armament: 4 x Otomat surface-to-surface missiles; 1 x 76 mm/62 OTO-Melara Compact gun; 1 x twin 40 mm/70 Breda-Bofors gun; 2 x twin 30 mm/75 Emerlec Ex-30 mounts

NNS Ekpe (P178) is a 58-metre (190 ft 3 in) fast attack craft of the Nigerian Navy and is the lead ship of her class. Since her commissioning in the 1980s, she has been homeported at NNS Beecroft in Apapa, Lagos. She is tasked with conducting coastal patrols and ensuring security along Nigeria's coastal waters primarily in the Gulf of Guinea. She is named for the Efik/Ibibio word for the leopard, an animal native to Nigeria. The vessel was deemed as "inactive" in 2020.

== Construction ==
She is the first of three German-built Ekpe-class vessels, all of which were laid down on 17 February 1979, at Lürssen Shipyards in Vegesack, West Germany. Ekpe was launched on 17 December 1979, with her service for the Nigerian Navy beginning in August 1980. She was the first missile-equipped fast attack craft (FAC) for the navy and was designed to complement their existing fleet of French La Combattante III type fast attack craft which were also to be delivered in the early 1980s. The vessel was refitted in the mid-1990s and her missiles were reportedly removed around this time to control upkeep costs. Further refurbishment occurred when her sister ship, Agu, was cannibalized between 1992 and 1995.

== Design ==
The vessel has a length of 58.1 metres (190 ft 7 in), with a 7.61-metre (25 ft 0 in) beam and a draught of 2.83 metres (9 ft 3 in) while displacing 373 tonnes (367 long tons). Her propulsion is provided by four MTU 16V956 TB92 diesel engines driving four shafts and producing 15,000 kilowatts (20,000 hp). She has a maximum speed of 38 knots (70 km/h; 44 mph) with a cruising speed of roughly 16 knots (30 km/h; 18 mph). She has a range of 2,600 nautical miles (4,800 km; 3,000 mi). As completed, she carried four Otomat Mk.1 surface-to-surface missiles with one 76 mm (3.0 in)/62-calibre OTO-Melara Compact Gun and one twin 40 mm (1.6 in)/70-calibre Breda-Bofors gun mount. She also was equipped with two twin 30 mm (1.2 in)/75-calibre Emerlec EX-30 mounts. Her sensors include Decca 1226C and WM-28 radars and RDL countermeasures. She is crewed by a complement of 40 personnel.

== Service in the Nigerian Navy ==
Since her commissioning, she has operated under Western Naval Command out of NNS Beecroft, the navy's largest operational base. Her mission includes supporting coastal security, patrolling territorial waters for fisheries violations, and managing the country's EEZ. Her entry to service coincides with Nigeria's rapid military growth during the late 20th century. During a 1997 ECOWAS/ECOMOG deployment to waters off Sierra Leone, which was undergoing an attempted coup, the vessel suffered a severe breakdown and was limited in her efforts to support international forces. During this deployment, she screened for potential close-in threats while allied ships bombarded land positions. While the vessel was listed as "active" in 2010, she was listed as "inactive" in 2020.
