= Tunisian Armed Forces =

Combined military forces of Tunisia

- القوات المسلحة التونسية
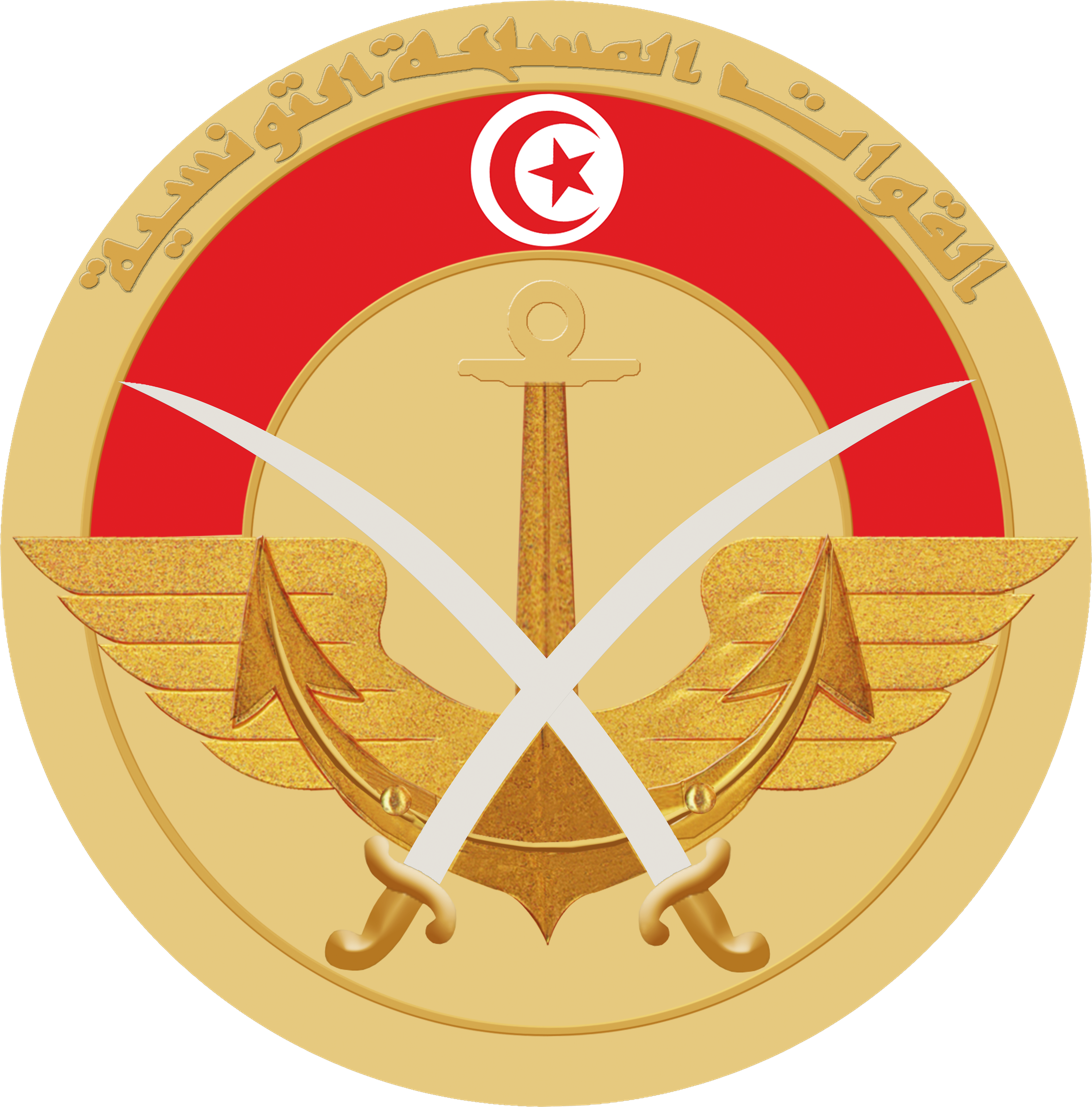
- Emblem of the Tunisian Armed Forces

- Flag of the Tunisian Armed Forces
- Founded: 30 June 1956
- Service branches: Army; Air Force; Navy
- Headquarters: Tunis

Leadership
- Commander-in-Chief: Kais Saied
- Minister of National Defense: Imed Memmich
- Inspector General of the Armed Forces: General Abdel Moneim Belati

Personnel
- Conscription: 12 months
- Active personnel: 89,800
- Deployed personnel: 96

Expenditure
- Budget: $2.1 billion (2026)
- Percent of GDP: 3.3% (2026)

Industry
- Foreign suppliers: Austria; Belgium; Brazil; China; Czech Republic; France; Germany; Italy; Russia; Spain; Sweden; Switzerland; South Korea; Turkey; United Kingdom; United States

Related articles
- History: Bizerte crisis Yom Kippur War; 1980 Gafsa Uprising; Tunisian bread riots UNAMIR; Battle of Wazzin; ISIL insurgency in Tunisia: Battle of Ben Guerdane
- Ranks: Military ranks of Tunisia

The Tunisian Armed Forces (Arabic: القوات المسلحة التونسية) consist of the Tunisian Army, Air Force and Navy.

As of 2019, Tunisia had armed forces with more than 150,000 active-duty personnel, of which 80,000 were conscripts. Paramilitary forces consisted of a 12,000-member national guard. Tunisia participates in United Nations peacekeeping efforts in the DROC (MONUSCO) and Côte d'Ivoire. Previous United Nations peacekeeping deployments for the Tunisian armed forces have included Cambodia (UNTAC), Namibia (UNTAG), Somalia, Rwanda, Burundi, Ethiopia/Eritrea (UNMEE), and the 1960s mission in the Congo, ONUC.

== History ==
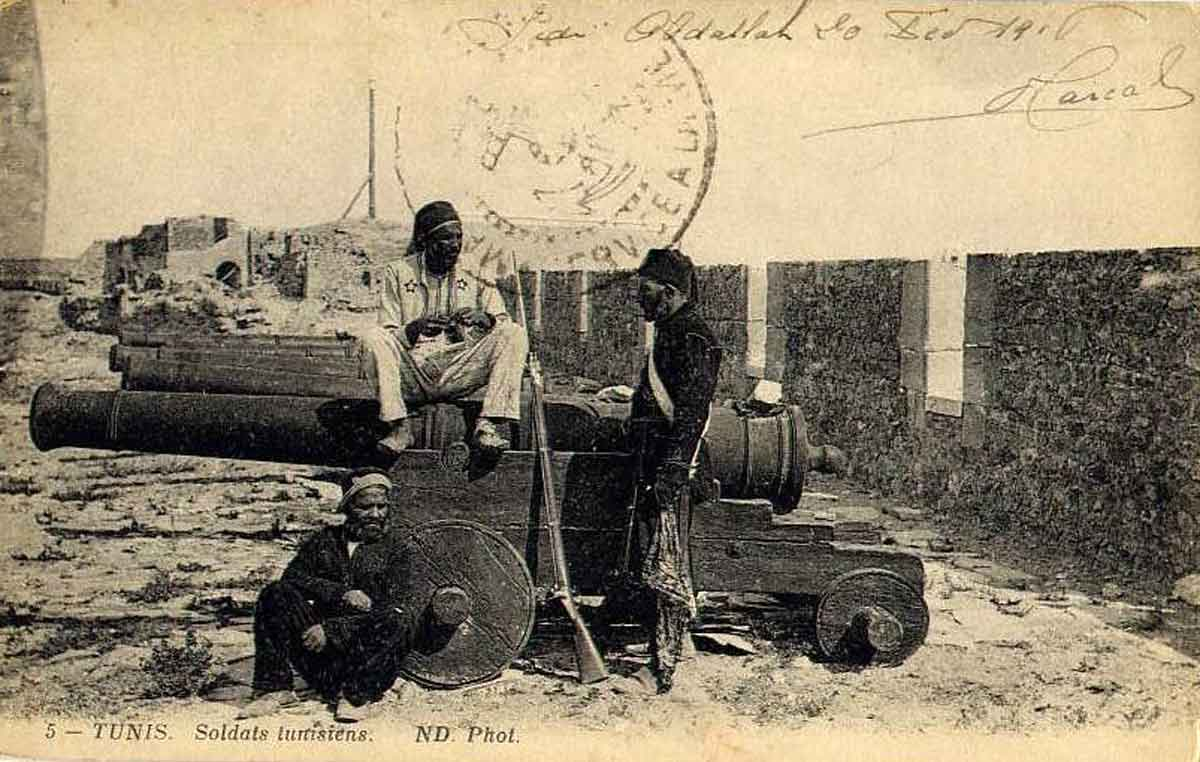
Tunisian artillery and gunners, circa 1900

The modern Tunisian army was formed in 1831 by Al-Husayn II ibn Mahmud. During the period of the French Protectorate (1881–1956) Tunisians were recruited in significant numbers into the French Army, serving as tirailleurs (infantry) and spahis (cavalry). These units saw active service in Europe during both World Wars, as well as in Indo-China prior to 1954. The only exclusively Tunisian military force permitted under French rule was the Beylical Guard.

=== Following independence ===
On June 30, 1956, the Tunisian army was officially founded by decree, in the form of a combined-arms regiment. The necessary equipment was made available to the young state from French stocks. The new army initially comprised 25 Tunisian officers, 250 NCOs and 1,250 men transferred from French Army service, plus 850 former members of the Beylical Guard. Approximately 4,000 Tunisian soldiers continued in French Army service until 1958, when the majority transferred to the Tunisian Army, which reached a strength of over 6,000 that year.

Intakes of conscripts for military service, made mandatory in January 1957, plus the recall of reservists allowed the army to grow to twelve battalions numbering 20,000 men by 1961. Sixty per cent of those troops were deployed for border monitoring and defense duties.

Tunisian units first saw action in 1958 after French intrusions into the south in pursuit of National Liberation Army (Algeria) fighters. In 1960 Tunisian troops served with the United National Peacekeeping Force in the Congo. 1,020 troops from the Tunisian Armed Forces were amongst the first UN troops to arrive in the Congo, by 20 July 1960. In 1961 clashes occurred with French forces based at Bizerte. More than 600 men fell in battle against the French forces. The French evacuated the base after subsequent negotiations with the Tunisian Government.

The Tunisian Navy, founded in 1958, received its first ship in the fall of 1959. The Air Force acquired its first combat aircraft in 1960 . While the Tunisian armed forces obtain equipment from several sources, the United States remains the largest single supplier. Officer and specialist training for Tunisian personnel was formerly undertaken in French and American military academies. Tunisian trainees are now gradually being assigned to newly established military schools within the country.

The January 10, 1957, a law prohibits any military officer to be a member of a group or a political party. However, after 7 November 1987 when the former Prime Minister, General Zine el-Abidine Ben Ali took power senior officers such as Abdelhamid Escheikh and Mustapha Bouaziz took up ministerial appointments.

On 30 April 2002, at around 18.15, the direction of the Army - Brigadier General Abdelaziz Skik who led the Tunisian contingent to Cambodia, two colonels - majors, three colonels, four majors, two lieutenants and a sergeant-major - disappeared in a helicopter crash near the town of Medjez el-Bab.

Tunisia has contributed military forces to United Nations peacekeeping missions, including an army company to the United Nations Assistance Mission for Rwanda (UNAMIR) during the Rwandan genocide. In his book Shake Hands with the Devil, Canadian force commander Roméo Dallaire gave the Tunisian soldiers high credit for their skills and effort in the conflict and referred to them as his "ace in the hole".

During the 2011 Libyan civil war, Tunisian forces, mostly border guards, saw some limited action when fighting between Libyan rebels and loyalist soldiers spilled over the border.

=== The military and politics ===
The Library of Congress Country Study says:

His exclusive power to promote military officers has been among the strongest components of Bourguiba's control over the armed forces. From independence, high-ranking officers—general staff and senior commanders in particular—have been carefully selected for their party loyalty more than for their professional experience and competence. This began in the late 1950s when the president dismissed those officers who had trained in the Middle East and who might therefore have been expected to sympathize with the militant Pan-Arab policies of Egypt's Nasser. The hand-picked senior officers, in turn, carefully screened all officers who were considered for positions of authority in line units to ensure that antiregime elements did not pose potential threats at any level of the military establishment. As a result of these promotion policies, the Tunisian officer corps took on a very homogeneous character that only began to break down in the 1970s. Senior officers have been generally representative of Tunisia's economically and politically dominant families from the north, the coastal areas, and the major cities. Although military men have been kept from operating major business ventures or holding political office while in uniform, it has been common for family members to be prominent in business or in the Destourian political movement. Generally Western and Francophile in outlook, tied by kinship to the country's upper socioeconomic stratum, and personally familiar with leading figures in the PSD, high-ranking Tunisian officers must be classed as part of the national elite.

In 2021, Tunisia boosted the role of military in their fight to curb the pandemic's spread. On Monday 5th, the Tunisian presidency announced that medical and paramedical university graduates of the last three years will be drafted by the army. The intent was to remedy to a shortage of medical staff in public and private hospitals because hundreds of unhappy health professionals have left the country in recent years. Among other decisions, a vaccination campaign will be waged by joint civilian-military teams around the country under the supervision of the army.

== General Staff ==
The supreme commander of the armed forces is the President of the Republic of Tunisia.

In December 2010, the staff is composed as follows: Chief of Staff of the Army corps is the Field Marshall Mohamed el ghoul, one of the Air Force is Brigadier General Taieb Lajimi and that the navy is Rear Admiral Mohamed Khamassi. In April 2011, Ammar became chief of staff inter-armed.

The Inspector General of the armed forces is Rear Admiral Tarek Faouzi Larbi, the Director of Military Engineering is Brigadier General Mohammed Hedi Abdelkafi and the director of military security Brigadier General Ahmed Chabir.

== Tunisian Army ==
The Tunisian Army is 80,000 strong and is composed essentially of:

- three mechanised brigades based at Kairouan (3rd), Gabès (1st) and Béja (2nd). Each is composed of:
  - one armoured regiment (M60 Patton tanks)
  - two regiments of mechanised infantry (M113, BMC Kirpi and Humvee)
  - one artillery regiment (M198 howitzer)
  - one reconnaissance company (AML 90, Humvee and Ejder Yalçin)
- one Saharan territorial group at Borj el-Khadra and Remada, consisting of two light infantry regiments
- one special forces group (Groupe des Forces Spéciales)
- one military police régiment

The army was also enlisted to help in curbing the spread of Covid in the country in July 2021 when the Tunisian presidency announced that medical and paramedical university graduates of the last three years would be drafted by the army.

== Air Force ==
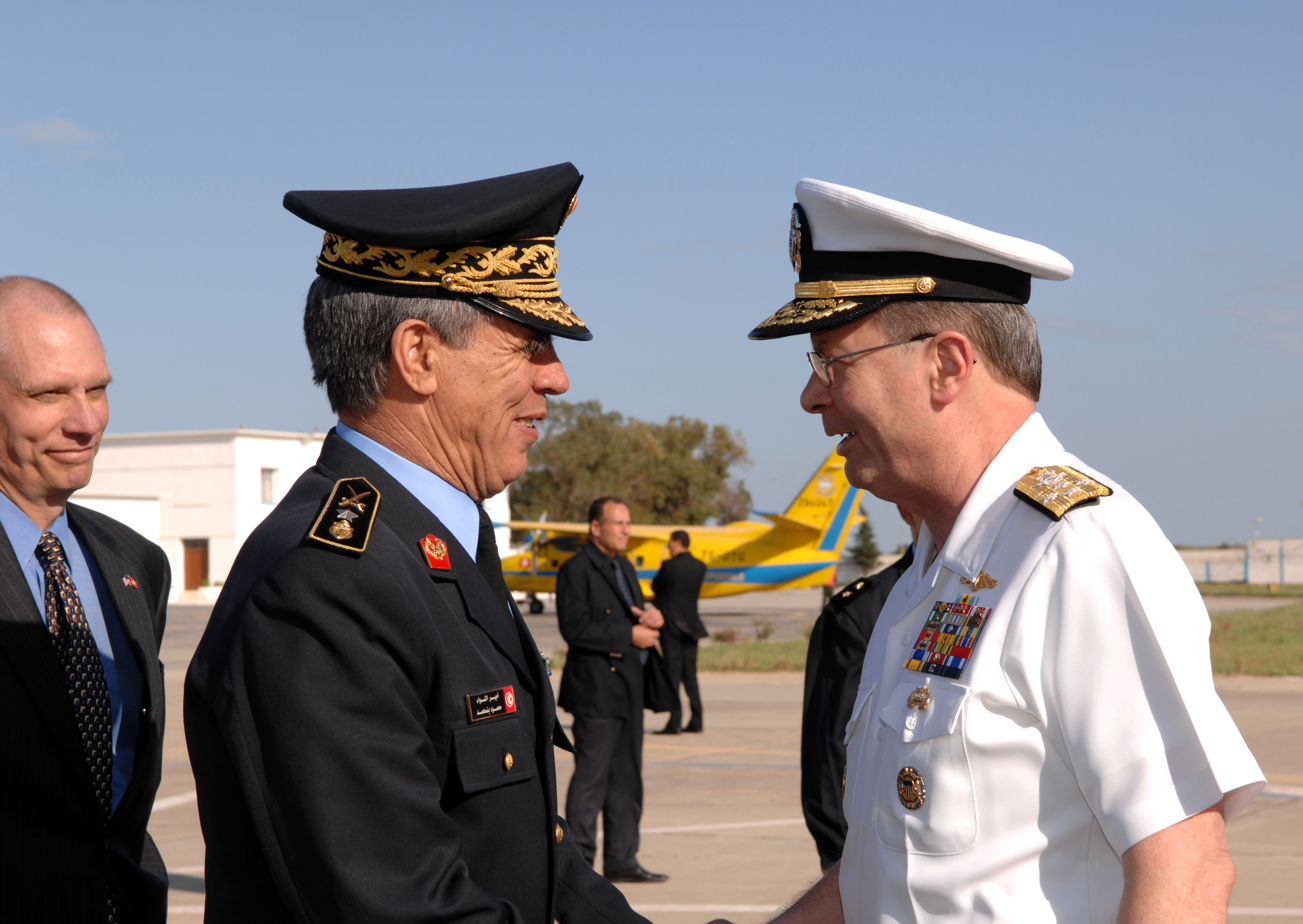
Admiral Edmund P. Giambastiani (right), Vice Chairman of the Joint Chiefs of Staff, meets Brigadier General Mahmoud Ben M'hamed, Tunisian Air Force Chief of Staff, at the Carthage Airport in Tunis, Tunisia, May 4, 2007.

The Tunisian Air Force is equipped with 10 Northrop F-5E Tiger II and two Northrop F-5F Tiger II. These form 15 Squadron at Bizerte-Sidi Ahmed Air Base. It also includes 12 Aero L-59T, as well as three Aermacchi MB-326K (combat capable) as well as 4 MB-326B, and 3 MB326L. Previously up to 8 Aermacchi MB-326B, 7-16 Aermacchi MB-326KT, and 4 Aermacchi MB-326LT were in service.

The IISS Military Balance 2013 lists six Lockheed C-130B Hercules, one Lockheed C-130H Hercules, five G-222s, three Let L-410UVP Turbolet (all assigned to one transport squadron) plus a liaison unit with two S-208A. Other reported transport aircraft include one Boeing 737-700/BBJ, two Dassault Falcon 20, and two Lockheed C-130J-30 Super Hercules.

Reported attack helicopters include four Hughes MD 500 Defenders, and 7-8 SNIAS SA-342 Gazelle.

Reported training/COIN and liaison aircraft include 12 SIAI Marchetti SF.260WC Warriors and 9 SIAI-Marchetti SF-260C, as well as 4 SIAI-Marchetti S.208A/M and one Reims F406.

Apart from Bizerte Sidi-Ahmed, there are military airfields reported at Bizerte (La-Kharouba), Gabes, Gafsa, and Sfax.

== Navy ==
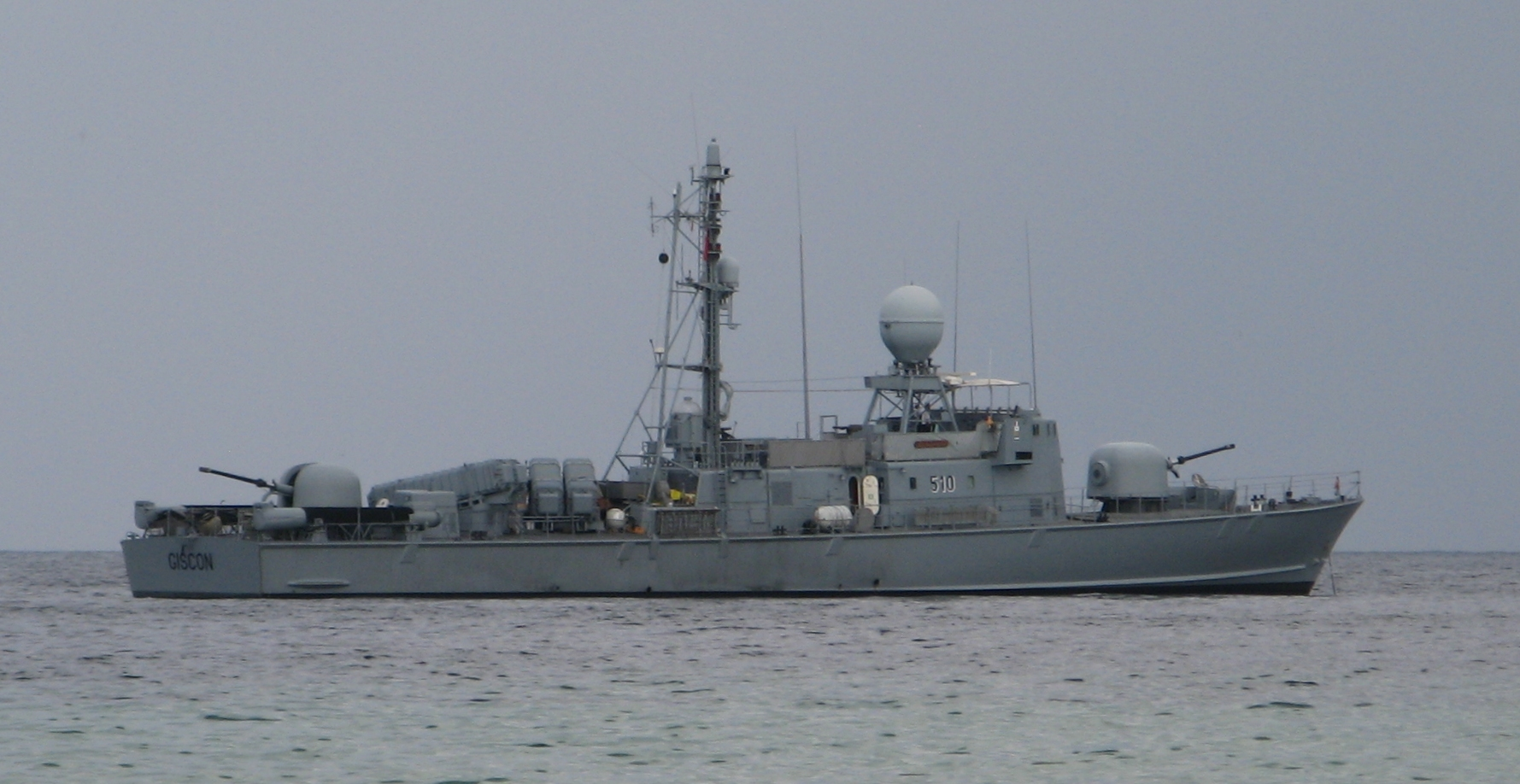
Giscon (510), a fast attack craft of the Tunisian Navy, photographed 21 October 2008

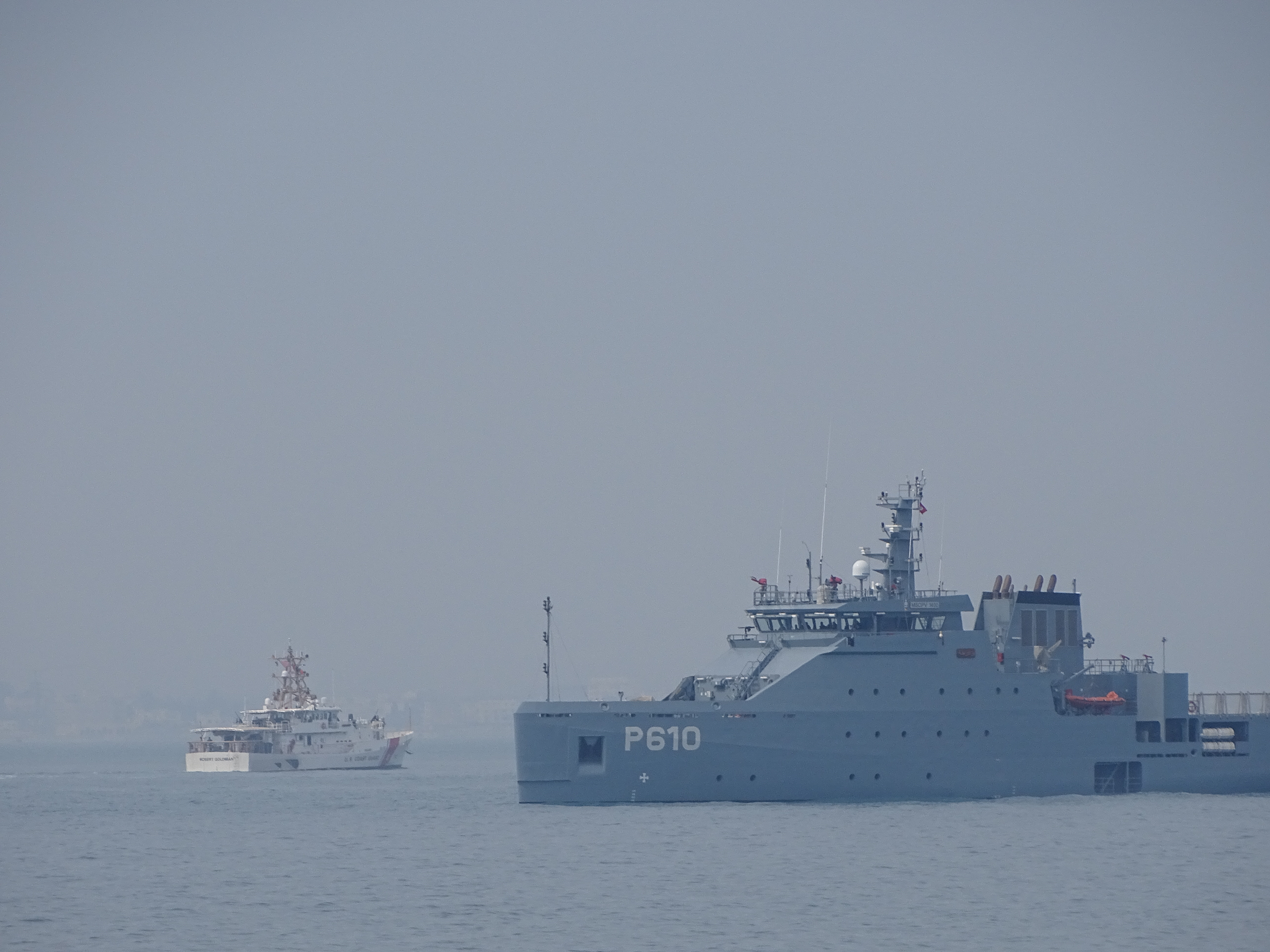
Tunisian Navy ship Jugurtha and USCGC Robert Goldman operating in Tunisian Waters in April 2021

Established in 1959, the Marine nationale tunisienne (Tunisian National Navy) initially received French assistance, including advisory personnel and several small patrol vessels. On 22 October 1973, the U.S. Edsall-class destroyer escort USS Thomas J. Gary (DE-326) was decommissioned in ceremonies at the Quai d'Honneur, Bizerte. Moments later, the ship was commissioned by the Tunisian Navy as the President Bourgiba. In the mid-1980s the force included President Bourguiba, two United States-built coastal minesweepers, and a variety of fast-attack and patrol craft. The most important additions to the fleet in the 1980s were three La Combattante III type fast attack craft armed with Exocet anti-ship missiles. Apart from these vessels, however, most of the fleet's units were old and capable of little more than coastal patrol duties.

During the 1960s and 1970s the navy was primarily involved in combating the smuggling of contraband, the illegal entry of un- desirable aliens, and unauthorized emigration as well as other coastal security activities. In these matters the overall effort was shared with agencies of the Ministry of Interior, especially the customs agents and immigration personnel of the Surete Nationale.

President Bourgiba suffered a major fire on 16 April 1992 and later left operational service.

Today the Tunisian Navy reportedly has bases at Bizerte, Kelibia, La Goulette, and Sfax. Formerly reported in service were six Kondor-II class minsweepers of 635 tons, equipped with 3 twin 25mm Guns. However, none were listed in service by the IISS Military Balance 2013. Also formerly in use were MBDA MM-40 Exocet and Nord SS-12M surface-to-surface missiles.

=== Fast attack craft ===
- 3 La Combattante III type fast attack craft La Galite class in Tunisian service (with 8xMM-40 SSMs, 1x76mm Gun, 2x40mm Guns, 4x30mm Guns)
- 6 Type-143 Lürssen Albatros class (2x76mm Gun, Mine Laying Capability) P506 Hannon is possibly out of service after the delivery of third MSOPV-1400 named Hannon
- 3 P-48 Bizerte class with 4x37mm Guns. Eight SS-12M SSMs were removed as obsolete.
- 3-5 Modified Hazhui\Shanghai-II class (128 ft,30 knots, 4x37mm Guns, 4x25mm Guns)

=== Patrol boats ===
- 4 Damen Group MSOPV-1400 72m Offshore patrol vessel
- 65 Foot (20.3M) Full Cabin Inboard Patrol Boats- Features dual 1600 hp MTU 10V2000 diesel engines, shock mitigating seating, climate control, navigation package, and are capable of speeds in excess of 40 knots. Built by U.S. Boat Builder SAFE Boats International and propulsion system designed and supplied by Pacific Power Group.
- 1 Ch.Navals De Lestrel 31.5m class (104 ft,30 knots,2x20mm Guns)
- 3 Ch.Navals De Lestrel 25m (83 ft,23 knots,1x20mm)
- 5 Bremse class (22.6m,2x14.5mm HMGs)
- 4 Gabes class(12.9m,2x12.7mm HMGs)
- 4 Rodman-38 class(11.6m)
- 2 Vosper Thornycroft 103 ft class (27 knota,2x20mm Guns)
- 6 20meter long PCs
- 4 Istiklal (Independence ) (3 on construction) 26.5meter Long PC
- 2 34m Island-Class Patrol Boats
- 1 52mt patrol vessel on construction

=== Landing craft and auxiliary vessels ===
Landing craft and auxiliary vessels include one LCT-3 class LCT, one Robert Conard class 63.7m Survey vessel (NHO Salammbo), one Wilkes class (T-AGS-33) survey ship (NRF Khaireddine), two El Jem class training ships (ex A 5378 Aragosta and A 5381 Polipo delivered by Italian Navy on 17 July 2002), one Simeto class Tanker ( Ain Zaghouin - ex A 5375 delivered by Italian Navy on 10.7.2003) and one White Sumac 40.5m class, one diver training vessel Zarzis.

=== Aircraft ===
- Boeing Insitu ScanEagle

== See also ==
- Tunisian navy (1705-1881)

== Bibliography ==
- IISS (2020). The Military Balance 2020. Routledge. ISBN 978-0367466398.
