= Al Zubarah-class corvette =

Class of Qatari warships

Class overview
- Name: Al Zubarah class
- Builders: Fincantieri, Muggiano
- Operators: Qatari Emiri Navy
- Built: 2018–2023
- In service: 2021–present
- Planned: 4
- Completed: 4
- Active: 4

General characteristics
- Type: Corvette
- Displacement: 3,250 long tons (3,300 t)
- Length: 107 m (351 ft 1 in)
- Beam: 14.7 m (48 ft 3 in)
- Propulsion: Combined diesel and diesel CODAD 4 Everllence 16V28/33D STC
- Speed: 28 knots (52 km/h; 32 mph)
- Boats & landing craft carried: Rigid-hulled inflatable boats
- Complement: 98 (capacity for 112)
- Armament: 1 × Leonardo 76 mm/62 Super Rapid gun; 2 × Leonardo Lionfish 20mm RWS; 16 × Aster 30 Block 1 surface-to-air missiles; 8 × Exocet MM40 Block 3 anti-ship missiles; 21 × RIM-116 Rolling Airframe Missiles
- Aircraft carried: 1 × NHIndustries NH90 helicopter
- Aviation facilities: Flight deck; Hangar

The Al Zubarah-class corvette, sometimes called the Doha class, is a class of multi-role corvette operated by the Qatari Emiri Navy. Four were built by Fincantieri.

== Development ==
On 16 June 2016, Qatar awarded Fincantieri a €4 billion contract that included the construction of the four Al Zubarah corvettes. The ships were delivered between 2021 and 2023.

In 2023, Fincantieri offered Greece a derivative of the Al Zubarah, the FCx30.

== Characteristics ==
The vessels are about 107m in length with a beam of 14.7m. They are equipped with combined diesel and diesel (CODAD) propulsion. They have accommodation for 112 people. They are capable of operating rigid-hull inflatable boats (RHIB) through a stern ramp or cranes.

The flight deck and hangar can accommodate a helicopter the size of an NH90.

The class is designed for air-defence missions and are equipped with 16 Aster 30 Block 1NT surface-to-air missiles as well as 21 RIM-116 Rolling Airframe Missiles.

In addition they are equipped with a 76mm main gun and two remote weapon stations.

For protection, the ships have four Sylena Mk2 decoy launchers by Lacroix Defence. The launchers are able to deploy corner reflector decoys to seduce radar-guided missiles as well as decoys that operate against infra-red seekers.

== Ships in class ==
Name	Hull no.	Builder	Laid down	Launched	Commissioned	Status
Al Zubarah	F101	Fincantieri, Muggiano	June 2018	27 February 2020	28 October 2021 (delivered)	In service
Damsah	F102	Fincantieri, Muggiano		13 February 2021	28 April 2022 (delivered)	In service
Al Khor	F103	Fincantieri, Muggiano		30 September 2021	22 December 2022 (delivered)	In service
Sumaysimah	F104	Fincantieri, Muggiano	13 February 2021	29 March 2022	16 May 2023 (delivered)	In service

== See also ==
- Littoral combat ship
- Kamorta-class corvette
- Steregushchiy-class corvette
- MILGEM project
- Formidable-class frigate
- Gepard-class frigate
- Incheon-class frigate
- Guaiquerí-class patrol boat
- Abu Dhabi-class corvette
