= Musherib-class patrol vessel =

Musherib-class offshore patrol vessels of Qatar Emiri Navy

Class overview
- Name: Musherib class
- Builders: Fincantieri, Muggiano
- Operators: Qatari Emiri Navy
- Built: 2019–2022
- In service: 2022-present
- Planned: 2 as of November 2020
- On order: 0
- Building: 0
- Completed: 2
- Active: 2

General characteristics
- Type: Offshore patrol vessel
- Displacement: 745 t (733 long tons)
- Length: 63.8 m (209 ft 4 in) loa; 59.6 m (195 ft 6 in) lpp
- Beam: 9.2 m (30 ft 2 in)
- Draft: 5.65 m (18 ft 6 in)
- Propulsion: Combined diesel and diesel
- Speed: 30 knots (56 km/h; 35 mph)
- Range: 1,500 nmi (2,800 km; 1,700 mi) at 15 knots (28 km/h; 17 mph)
- Endurance: 21 days
- Complement: 38
- Sensors & processing systems: Multi-Functional Radar (Leonardo Kronos HP); IFF Interrogator & Transponder (Leonardo SIRM-C + Transponder); EWS Radar & Communication (Elettronica RESM/CESM); IR Search & Tracking System (Leonardo SASS); Radar & E/O Fire Control System (Leonardo NA-30S Mk2); E/O Fire Control Systems (Leonardo Medusa Mk4B); Dual band Navigation Radar (Kelvin Hughes Mk11 SharpEye); Leonardo Athena Command Management System
- Electronic warfare & decoys: 4 × Sylena Mk2 decoy launchers
- Armament: 1 × OTO Melara 76 mm gun; 8 × VL MICA surface-to-air missiles; 4 × Exocet MM40 Block 3 anti-ship missiles; 2 × 2 Marlins remote weapons
- Aviation facilities: Vertrep Spot

The Musherib class is a class of offshore patrol vessels built by Fincantieri for the Qatari Emiri Navy.

== Development ==
Fincantieri showcased the Musherib-class offshore patrol vessels for the Qatari Emiri Navy during DIMDEX 2018. In August 2017, Qatar officially announced for the order of the two ships of the class after signing the contract in June 2016. She started sea trials on 2 April 2021.

They are able to operate high speed boats such as rigid-hulled inflatable boats with the help of lateral cranes and hauling ramps.

== Ships in class ==
Name	Hull no.	Builder	Laid down	Launched	Commissioned	Status
Musherib	Q61	Fincantieri, Muggiano	27 February 2019	18 September 2020	29 January 2022	In service
Sheraouh	Q62	Fincantieri, Muggiano		5 June 2021	7 July 2022	In service
