= Qatari Emiri Navy =

Naval warfare branch of the Qatar Armed Forces

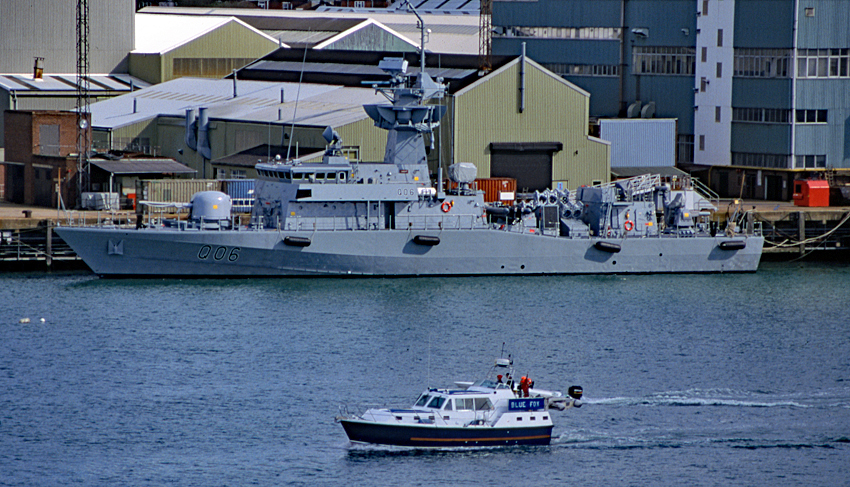
- Al Udeid fitting out at VTS Woolston
- Country: Qatar
- Branch: Navy
- Size: 2,500 personnel
- Part of: Qatar Armed Forces
- Base locations: Doha; Al Daayen; Halul Island; Ras Abu Aboud
- Equipment: 4 corvettes 24 offshore patrol vessels 4 amphibious warfare ships 2 auxiliary ships
- Engagements: 2026 Iran war

Commanders
- Chief of Staff: Maj. Gen. Abdullah Hassan Al-Sulaiti

Insignia
- Naval ensign

The Qatari Emiri Navy (Arabic: البحرية الأميرية القطرية, romanized: Al-Bahriyah Al-Amiriyah Al-Qatariyah) (QEN) is the naval branch of the armed forces of the State of Qatar.

== History ==
The State of Qatar did not possess any ships originally upon gaining independence from the United Kingdom in 1971, but by 1992 the country's armed forces had grown considerably, and included a navy of about 700 personnel. Three La Combattante III missile boats from France formed the core of the Qatari fleet in the 1990s, later seeing the addition of six Vosper Thornycroft large patrol boats. By 2010, it increased in size to about 1,800 personnel, and has taken part in multiple naval exercises with the United States Navy and other countries.

== Organization ==
Unable to support a large military, Qatar relies on a smaller mobile force that can quickly repel incursions into its territorial waters. However, the Iran–Iraq War saw attacks on shipping just outside the country's territorial waters, underscoring its vulnerability. Despite the expansion, the Qatar Emiri Navy remains too under-manned, under-trained, and under-equipped to be able to effectively defend its waters as well as the commercial assets in it. The Qatar Navy includes its coast guard, marine police and coastal artillery.

== Ship and equipment of Qatari Emiri Navy ==
The current fleet of the Qatari Emiri Navy is as follows:

Class or name	Image	Builder	Type	Year entered service	Details	Ships
Corvette
Doha class		Fincantieri, Muggiano, Italy	Corvette	4 in service	4 x 107-metre long corvette built by Fincantieri. Armament : 1 × OTO Melara 76 mm; 16 × Aster 30 Block 1NT surface-to-air missiles; 8 × Exocet MM40 Block 3 anti-ship missiles; 2 × 2 Marlins remote weapons; 1 × RIM-116 Rolling Airframe Missile	Al Zubarah (F101) Damsah (F102) Al Khor (F103) Sumaysimah (F104)
Offshore patrol vessel
Musherib class		Fincantieri, Muggiano, Italy	Offshore patrol vessel	2 in service	2 x 63-metre-long offshore patrol vessels built by Fincantieri. Armament : 1 × OTO Melara 76 mm; 8 × VL MICA surface-to-air missiles; 4 × Exocet MM40 Block 3 anti-ship missiles; 2 × 2 Marlins remote weapons	Musherib (Q61) Sheraouh (Q62)
Ares 150 Hercules class		Ares Shipyard, Antalya, Turkey	Offshore patrol vessel	2 in service	2 x 48-metre offshore patrol vessels by Ares Shipyard. Armament : 1 x Aselsan 12.7mm	QC 901 QC 902
Fast attack craft
Damsah class		CMN, Cherbourg, France	Fast attack craft	1982–1983 (Active)	3 x 56-metre fast attack craft built by Constructions Mécaniques de Normandie. Armament : 2 x OTO Melara 76 mm; 2 x Oerlikon 30 mm; 8 x Exocet MM40 Block 3 anti-ship missiles; 2 x Single torpedo launcher	Damsah (Q01) Al Ghariyah (Q02) Rbigah (Q03)
Barzan class		Vosper Thornycroft, Southampton, United Kingdom	Fast attack craft	1996–1997 (Active)	4 x 56-metre fast attack craft built by Vosper Thornycroft. Armament : 1 x OTO Melara 76 mm; 1 x 30 mm Goalkeeper; 2 x Exocet MM40 Block 3 anti-ship missiles; 1 x Mistral 6-cell launcher	Barzan (Q04) Huwar (Q05) Al Udied (Q06) Al Deebeel (Q07)
MRTP 34 class		Yonca-Onuk, Istanbul, Turkey	Fast attack craft	2013 (Active)	3 x 40-metre fast attack craft built by Yonca-Onuk. Armament : 1 x Aselsan 30 mm	Q31 Q32 Q33
MRTP 24/U class		Yonca-Onuk, Istanbul, Turkey	Fast attack craft	2018 (Active)	4 x 26.3-metre fast attack craft built by Yonca-Onuk. Also used as special operation craft. Armament : 1 x Aselsan 30 mm; 1 x Aselsan 12.7 mm	
MRTP 24/U class		Yonca-Onuk, Istanbul, Turkey	Fast attack craft	2018 (Active)	4 x 26.3-metre fast missile craft built by Yonca-Onuk. Armament : 1 x Aselsan 30 mm; 1 x Aselsan 12.7 mm; 4 x Roketsan UMTAS or Thales LMM	
MRTP 20 class		Yonca-Onuk, Istanbul, Turkey	Fast attack craft	(Active)	10 x 22.55-metre fast attack craft built by Yonca-Onuk. Armament : 1 x Aselsan 30 mm	
MRTP 16 class		Yonca-Onuk, Istanbul, Turkey	Fast attack craft	2012 (Active)	3 x 17.7-metre fast attack craft built by Yonca-Onuk. Armament : 1 x Aselsan 30 mm	Q49
Amphibious warfare ship
Al Fulk		Fincantieri	Landing Platform Dock /Helicopter Carrier	(Active)	Armament : 1 × OTO Melara 76 mm/62 SR Super Rapido; 4 × OTO Melara 30 mm Marlin WS rapid fire gun; 2 x 8-cell SYLVER A50 VLS for Aster 15&30 missiles	Helicopter: 3 x NHIndustries NH90
Robha class			Landing ship tank	(Active)	1 x landing ship tank.	Can load 3 × MBTs and 100 men.
			Landing ship utility	(Active)	4 x landing ship utility.	
			Support ship	(Active)	1 x support ship.	
Training ship
Al Doha class		Anadolu Shipyard, Turkey	Training ship	Active	2 x 90-metre training ships.	Al Doha (QTS 91) Al Shamal (QTS 92)

=== Minor patrol forces ===
- 4 Vosper patrol boats
  United Kingdom
  120 tons full load
- 6 Vosper 110 ft. class PCs
  United Kingdom
- 6 Damen Polycat 1,450 class PCs
- 2 Keith Nelson type 44 ft.class PCs
- 2 Fairey Marine Interceptor class PCs
  United Kingdom
- 4 MV-45 class PCs
- 25 Fairy Marine Spear class
  United Kingdom
- 5 P-1500 class PCs
- 4 DV-15 class PCs
- 3 Helmatic M-160 class PCs

=== Special maritime forces ===
- 11 fast interceptor boats Qatar

=== Auxiliary ===
- 2 Halmatic (Vosper Thornycroft) Pilot craft
- 4 Rotrork craft

=== Missiles and equipment ===
- 4 × Oto Melara 76 mm Compact-weapon system Italy
- MBDA Exocet MM40 Block-III (x 70)\ MM-40 (x 220)\ MM-38 SSMs France
- MBDA Mistral SAMs France
- 4 × Goalkeeper anti missile\aircraft gun Netherlands
- 4 × Stingeo ship sensor Netherlands
- 4 × Exocet coast defense batteries France
- 4 × MMR-3D Radar France

== Ranks ==
Officer ranks

Rank group	General / flag officers				Senior officers			Junior officers
Qatari Emiri Navy
Qatari Emiri Navy	فريق أول; Fariq 'awal	فريق; Fariq	لواء; Liwa	عميد; Amid	عقيد; Aqid	مقدم; Muqaddam	رائد; Ra'id	نقيب; Naqib	ملازم أول; Mulazim awwal	ملازم; Mulazim

Enlisted and NCO ranks

Rank group	Senior NCOs				Junior NCOs		Enlisted
Qatari Emiri Navy							No insignia
Qatari Emiri Navy	وكيل اول; Wakil awwal	وكيل ثاني; Wakil thani	رقيب; Raqib	نائب; Nayib	عريف; Earif	وكيل عريف; Wakil earif	جندي; Jundi

== Future acquisitions ==
The patrol boat program called for the delivery of six patrol boats with the first unit beginning construction in 2012 and being delivered by 2014. Although the proposals for the corvette program were due in the near-term as well, AMI believed that the four corvettes may not begin construction for several more years as Damen/Nakilat may want to gain some experience with the smaller 62-meter patrol boat hulls prior to moving on the larger Sigma hulls. If the QENF wishes to move the corvette program forward to an earlier date, it could start some of the hull blocks at Nakilat and/or at Damen in the Netherlands much earlier.

The Qatar Coast Guard Services placed an order for 17 new fast patrol boats from the Turkish company ARES Shipyard. The deal of 17 vessels consists in ten "ARES 110 Hercules" multi-role patrol craft 117 tons, five "ARES 75 Hercules" multi-role patrol craft 58 tons and two "ARES 150 Hercules" multi-role patrol craft 245 tons. These fast patrol boats will be constructed using advanced composite materials and are expected to be completed within the next five years.

On 31 March 2014, Nakilat Damen Shipyards Qatar (NDSQ) and Qatar Armed Forces signed two MoUs for the construction of seven vessels at Qatar's premier shipyard ($851 million). The MoUs signed by NDSQ and Qatar Armed Forces concern six 50 m (164 ft)-long axe-bow high-speed patrol vessels and one 52 m (171 ft)-long diving support vessel for the Qatar Armed Forces. The diving support vessel includes decompression capabilities. A large Integrated Logistic Support package is also mentioned in the MoUs.

On 16 June 2016, Qatar has signed a letter of agreement with Italian shipyard Fincantieri to build:

- 1 landing helicopter dock (similar to the Fincantieri-built Algerian amphibious transport dock Kalaat Béni Abbès;
- 4 Doha-class corvettes (3,250 tons) with a helicopter deck and hangar. Weapons: 1 Oto Melara 76 mm, two 30 mm guns, 16-cell VLS for Aster 30 surface-to-air missiles, 8 Exocet MM40 Block III anti-ship missiles, and a RAM launcher with 21 RIM-116 short range rolling airframe missiles. First keel laid by Fincantieri in November 2018.
- 2 offshore patrol boats (670 tons). Weapons: 1 Oto Melara 76 mm, 2 30 mm guns, 8-cell VLS for VL MICA short range surface-to-air missiles and 4 Exocet MM40 Block III anti-ship missiles.

The deal has a worth of €4.9 billion.

On 19 December 2017, the Qatari Navy was said to be going ahead with plans to reinforce its underwater capabilities including the possibility of acquiring light submarines.

The Qatar Emiri Naval Forces ordered two cadet training ships (CTS) from Turkish shipbuilder Anadolu Shipyard. According to Anadolu Shipyard, the vessels will displace 1,950 tonnes and feature a helipad for a medium-size helicopter. The vessels are also set to be capable of performing offshore patrol duties.

In February 2020, Qatar had a memorandum of understanding (MoU) with Italian defense company Fincantieri, to acquire submarines, based on a 5-billion-euro deal signed in 2017.
