= QENS Al Zubarah =

Doha-class corvette

History

Qatar
- Name: Al Zubarah; (الزبارة)
- Namesake: Al Zubarah
- Ordered: June 2016
- Builder: Fincantieri, Italy
- Laid down: June 2018
- Launched: 27 February 2020
- Commissioned: 28 October 2021
- Identification: Pennant number: F101
- Status: In service

General characteristics
- Class & type: Doha-class corvette
- Displacement: 3,250 long tons (3,300 t)
- Length: 107 m (351 ft 1 in)
- Beam: 14.7 m (48 ft 3 in)
- Propulsion: Combined diesel and diesel
- Speed: 28 knots (52 km/h; 32 mph)
- Range: 3,500 nmi (6,500 km; 4,000 mi)
- Endurance: 21 days
- Complement: 112
- Sensors & processing systems: Thesan mine avoidance sonar; Kronos main radar system; Athena combat system
- Electronic warfare & decoys: 4 × Sylena Mk2 decoy launchers
- Armament: 1 × OTO Melara 76 mm gun; 16 × Aster 30 Block 1 surface-to-air missiles; 8 × Exocet MM40 Block 3 anti-ship missiles; 2 × 2 Marlins remote weapons; 1 × RIM-116 Rolling Airframe Missile
- Aircraft carried: 1 × NHIndustries NH90 helicopter
- Aviation facilities: Flight deck; Enclosed hangar

Al Zubarah (F101) is the lead ship of the Doha-class corvettes built for the Qatari Emiri Navy.

== Development ==
Fincantieri showcased for the first time the multi-role air defence corvettes for the Qatari Emiri Navy during DIMDEX 2018. In August 2017, Qatar officially announced for the order of the 4 ships of the class after signing the contract in June 2016.

They are able to operate high speed boats such as rigid-hulled inflatable boats with the help of lateral cranes and hauling ramps. All four of the Doha class will serve as the backbone of the Qatari Emiri Navy.

== Construction and career ==
Al Zubarah was laid down in June 2018 in Fincantieri shipyard in Muggiano, Italy. She was launched on 27 February 2020, and expected to arrive in Qatar in 2021. She was commissioned into Qatari service on 28 October 2021.
