= QENS Damsah =

Doha-class corvette

History

Qatar
- Name: Damsah; (دامسة)
- Ordered: June 2016
- Builder: Fincantieri, Italy
- Launched: 13 February 2021
- Commissioned: 28 April 2022
- Identification: Pennant number: F102
- Status: Launched, will be put in service

General characteristics
- Class & type: Doha-class corvette
- Displacement: 3,250 long tons (3,300 t)
- Length: 107 m (351 ft 1 in)
- Beam: 14.7 m (48 ft 3 in)
- Propulsion: Combined diesel and diesel
- Speed: 28 knots (52 km/h; 32 mph)
- Range: 3,500 nmi (6,500 km; 4,000 mi)
- Endurance: 21 days
- Complement: 112
- Sensors & processing systems: Thesan mine avoidance sonar; Kronos main radar system; Athena combat system
- Electronic warfare & decoys: 4 × Sylena Mk2 decoy launchers
- Armament: 1 × OTO Melara 76 mm gun; 16 × Aster 30 Block 1 surface-to-air missiles; 8 × Exocet MM40 Block 3 anti-ship missiles; 2 × 2 Marlins remote weapons; 1 × RIM-116 Rolling Airframe Missile
- Aircraft carried: 1 × NHIndustries NH90 helicopter
- Aviation facilities: Flight deck; Enclosed hangar

Damsah (F102) is the second ship of the Doha-class corvettes built for the Qatari Emiri Navy.

== Development ==
Fincantieri showcased for the first time the multi-role air defence corvettes for the Qatari Emiri Navy during DIMDEX 2018. In August 2017, Qatar officially announced for the order of the 4 ships of the class after signing the contract in June 2016.

They are able to operate high speed boats such as rigid-hulled inflatable boats with the help of lateral cranes and hauling ramps. All four of the Doha class will serve as the backbone of the Qatari Emiri Navy.

== Construction and career ==
Damsah was launched on 13 February 2021 at Fincantieri shipyard in Muggiano, Italy.
