= QENS Musherib =

Musherib-class offshore patrol vessel

History

Qatar
- Name: Musherib; (مشيرب)
- Namesake: Musherib
- Ordered: June 2016
- Builder: Fincantieri, Italy
- Laid down: August 2017
- Launched: 18 September 2020
- Commissioned: 29 January 2022
- Identification: Pennant number: Q61
- Status: In service

General characteristics
- Class & type: Musherib-class offshore patrol vessel
- Length: 63 m (206 ft 8 in)
- Beam: 9.2 m (30 ft 2 in)
- Propulsion: Combined diesel and diesel
- Speed: 30 knots (56 km/h; 35 mph)
- Endurance: 21 days
- Complement: 38
- Sensors & processing systems: Thesan mine avoidance sonar; Kronos main radar system; Athena combat system
- Electronic warfare & decoys: 4 × Sylena Mk2 decoy launchers
- Armament: 1 × OTO Melara 76 mm gun; 8 × VL MICA surface-to-air missiles; 4 × Exocet MM40 Block 3 anti-ship missiles; 2 × 2 Marlins remote weapons
- Aircraft carried: 1 × NHIndustries NH90 helicopter
- Aviation facilities: Flight deck; Enclosed hangar

Musherib (Q61) is the lead ship of the Musherib-class offshore patrol vessels built for the Qatari Emiri Navy.

== Development ==
Fincantieri showcased the Musherib-class offshore patrol vessels for the Qatari Emiri Navy during DIMDEX 2018. In August 2017, Qatar officially announced for the order of the two ships of the class after signing the contract in June 2016.

They are able to operate high speed boats such as rigid-hulled inflatable boats with the help of lateral cranes and hauling ramps.

== Construction and career ==
Musherib was laid down in August 2017 in Fincantieri shipyard in Muggiano, Italy. She was launched on 18 September 2020, and expected to arrive in Qatar in 2022.
