= Tunisian Navy =

Maritime warfare branch of Tunisia's military

- Arabic: الجيش البحري التونسي; French: Marine nationale tunisienne
- Seal of the Tunisian Navy
- Active: 1956–Present
- Country: Tunisia
- Branch: Navy
- Type: Navy
- Role: Naval warfare
- Size: 5,000 personnel
- Part of: Tunisian Armed Forces
- Headquarters: Bizerte
- Fleet: 45+ vessels (see list)
- Engagements: Bizerte crisis 1985 Israeli attack on Tunisia

Commanders
- Commander-in-Chief: Kais Saied
- Commander of the Navy: Admiral Adel Jehane

Insignia
- Naval Jack

The Tunisian Navy (Arabic: الجيش البحري التونسي, lit. 'Tunisian Sea Army'), officially the Tunisian National Navy, is the naval warfare branch of the Tunisian Armed Forces. Founded in 1956 following Tunisia's independence from France, its primary mission is to defend the nation's sovereignty and territorial integrity, protect its exclusive economic zone (EEZ), and secure its 1,400-kilometre (870 mi) coastline. The navy also plays a critical role in combating illicit activities such as smuggling, illegal immigration, and terrorism in the Mediterranean Sea.

== History ==
=== Early years ===
The Tunisian Navy was established with modest beginnings, initially inheriting a few small patrol craft from the French naval presence. Its first major acquisition was the procurement of three La Combatante-type fast attack craft from France in the late 1960s, which formed the core of its early offensive capability.

=== Modernization and expansion ===
Throughout the 1980s and 1990s, the navy underwent significant modernization to address growing regional security challenges, including the 1985 border conflict with Libya. It expanded its fleet with vessels from various sources, including the United States, Italy, and Germany. Key acquisitions included Bizerte-class and Albatroz-class patrol boats.

In the 21st century, the navy's role has evolved to meet non-traditional security threats. It has been actively involved in international maritime security initiatives, such as NATO's Operation Active Endeavour and its successor, Operation Sea Guardian. The navy played a pivotal role in enforcing the naval blockade against Libya during the 2011 civil war and has been crucial in intercepting arms and terrorist movements across the Mediterranean.

== Organization ==
The Tunisian Navy is commanded by the Chief of Naval Staff, based in Tunis. Its operational structure is divided into two main naval bases, which serve as the primary hubs for its fleet:

=== Primary naval bases ===
Base of Bizerte: The main and largest naval base, located in the strategic northern city of Bizerte. It hosts the majority of the navy's major combatants.

Base of Sfax: A key base in the central-eastern region, crucial for operations in the Gulf of Gabès and southern maritime approaches.

Additional smaller stations and facilities are maintained in Kelibia, La Goulette, and Zarzis.

== Fleet ==
As of 2023, the Tunisian Navy operates a diverse fleet of over 45 vessels. The fleet is categorized as follows:

=== Active vessels ===
| Class | Vessels | Type | Number | Origin | References |
|---|---|---|---|---|---|
| Damen Offshore Patrol Vessel 1400 | Jugurtha (P610), Syphax (P611), Hannon (P612), Sophonisbe (P613) | Patrol boat | 4 | Netherlands | |
| Island-class patrol boat | Tazarka (Tazarga) ,Menzel Bourguiba (Menzel Bourguiba) | Patrol boat | 2 | United States | |
| SAFE Archangel Boats | | Patrol boat | NA | United States | |
| Bourguiba class (ex-Cannon class) | Bourguiba (201) | Frigate / Training ship | 1 | United States | |
| Rais Al Adeb class (ex-Kondor I class) | Rais Al Adeb (502) | Light frigate | 1 | East Germany | |
| La Galite (La Combatante 42) | La Galite (501), Tunis (502), Carthage (503) | Fast attack craft (Missile) | 3 | France | |
| Bizerte class (Lurssen 58-meter type) | Bizerte (P301), Monastir (P302), Sousse (P304) | Fast attack craft (Missile) | 3 | Germany | |
| Albatros class (Albatroz class) | Hannibal (P203), Salambo (P204), Sufetula (P205) | Patrol boat | 3 | Germany | |
| Vosper 37m Type | Jebel Boukornine (P208), Jebel Ennadhour (P209), Jebel Sessas (P210), Jebel Orbata (P211) | Patrol boat | 4 | United Kingdom | |
| Rampart 36 Type | P 601 - P 604 | Patrol boat | 4 | United Kingdom | |
| J class | P 101 - P 106 | Coastal patrol craft | 6 | France | |
| Jebel Boukornine class | P 207, P 212, P 213, P 214 | Coastal patrol craft | 4 | Tunisia | |
| Defender class | 3 vessels | Patrol boat (RB-S) | 3 | United States | |
| BATRAL class (BATRAL) | Khaireddine (P 401) | Landing ship transport | 1 | France | |
| CTM class (CTM (landing craft)) | P 611, P 612, P 621, P 622 | Landing craft | 4 | France | |

=== Retired vessels ===
| Class | Vessels | Type | Number | Origin | Service Period | References |
|---|---|---|---|---|---|---|
| Broadsword class | N/A | Patrol boat | 2 | United States | 1960s–1990s | |
| Sahara class | N/A | Patrol craft | 2 | United States | 1960s–1980s | |
| Garde-Côte 18m Type | N/A | Coastal patrol craft | 2 | France | 1970s–2000s | |

=== Future modernization ===
Tunisia has ongoing plans to modernize its aging fleet. Projects under consideration or negotiation have included the acquisition of new offshore patrol vessels (OPVs) from European shipbuilders and the potential upgrade of existing missile systems.

== Ranks and insignia ==
=== Commissioned officer ranks ===
The rank insignia of commissioned officers.

| Rank group | General / flag officers | | | Senior officers | | | | Junior officers |
|---|---|---|---|---|---|---|---|---|---|---|
| Tunisian National Navy |
| Tunisian National Navy | فريق أول بالبحرية; Fariq 'awal bialbaḥria | فريق بالبحرية; Fariq bialbaḥria | أمير لواء بالبحرية 'amir liwa' bialbaḥria | عميد بالبحرية; Amid bialbaḥria | عقيد بالبحرية; Aqid bialbaḥria | مقدم بالبحرية; Muqaddam bialbaḥria | رائد بالبحرية; Ra'id bialbaḥria | نقيب بالبحرية; Naqib bialbaḥria | ملازم أول بالبحرية; Mulazim 'awal bialbaḥria | ملازم بالبحرية; Mulazim bialbaḥria |
| Tunisian National Navy | Amiral | Vice-amiral | Contre-amiral | Capitaine de vaisseau major | Capitaine de vaisseau | Capitaine de frégate | Capitaine de corvette | Lieutenant de vaisseau | Enseigne de vaisseau de 1^{re} classe | Enseigne de vaisseau de 2^{e} classe |

=== Other ranks ===
The rank insignia of non-commissioned officers and enlisted personnel.

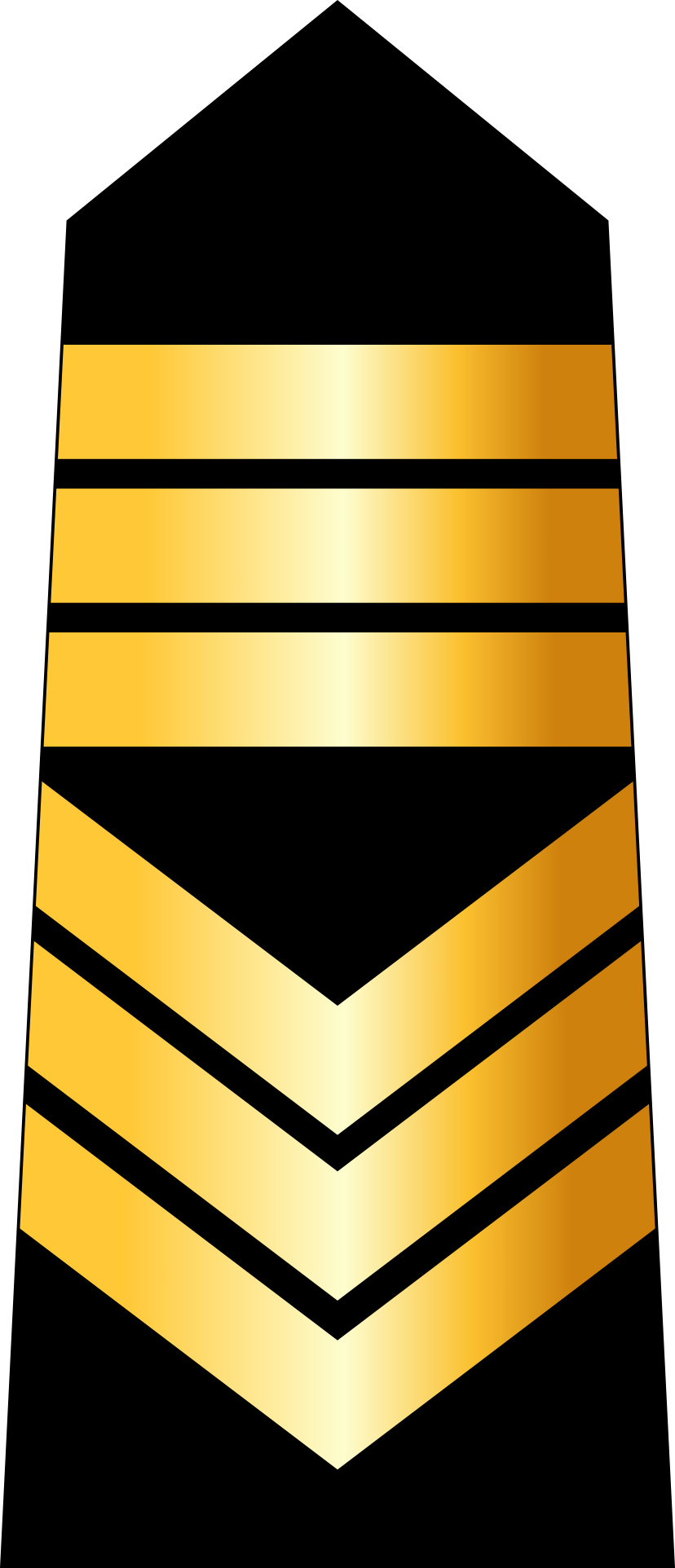
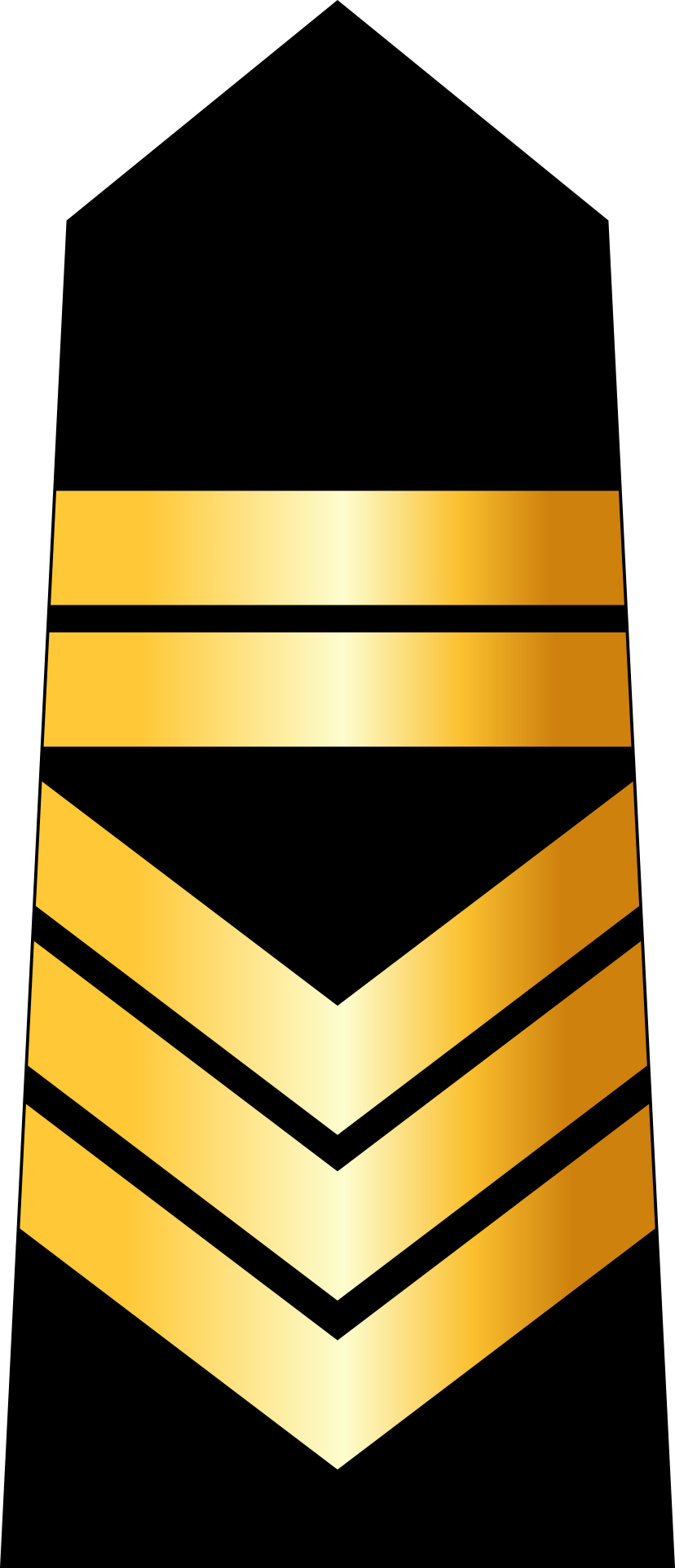
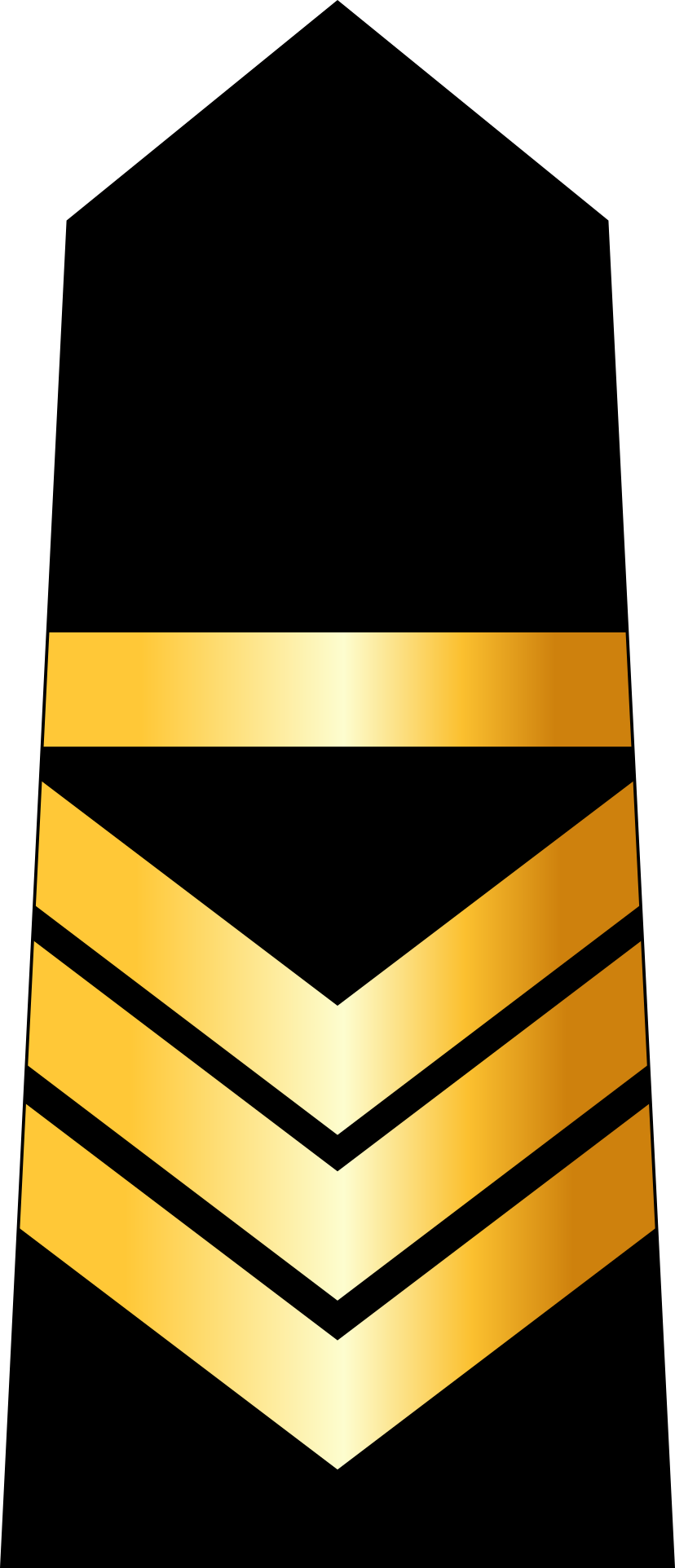
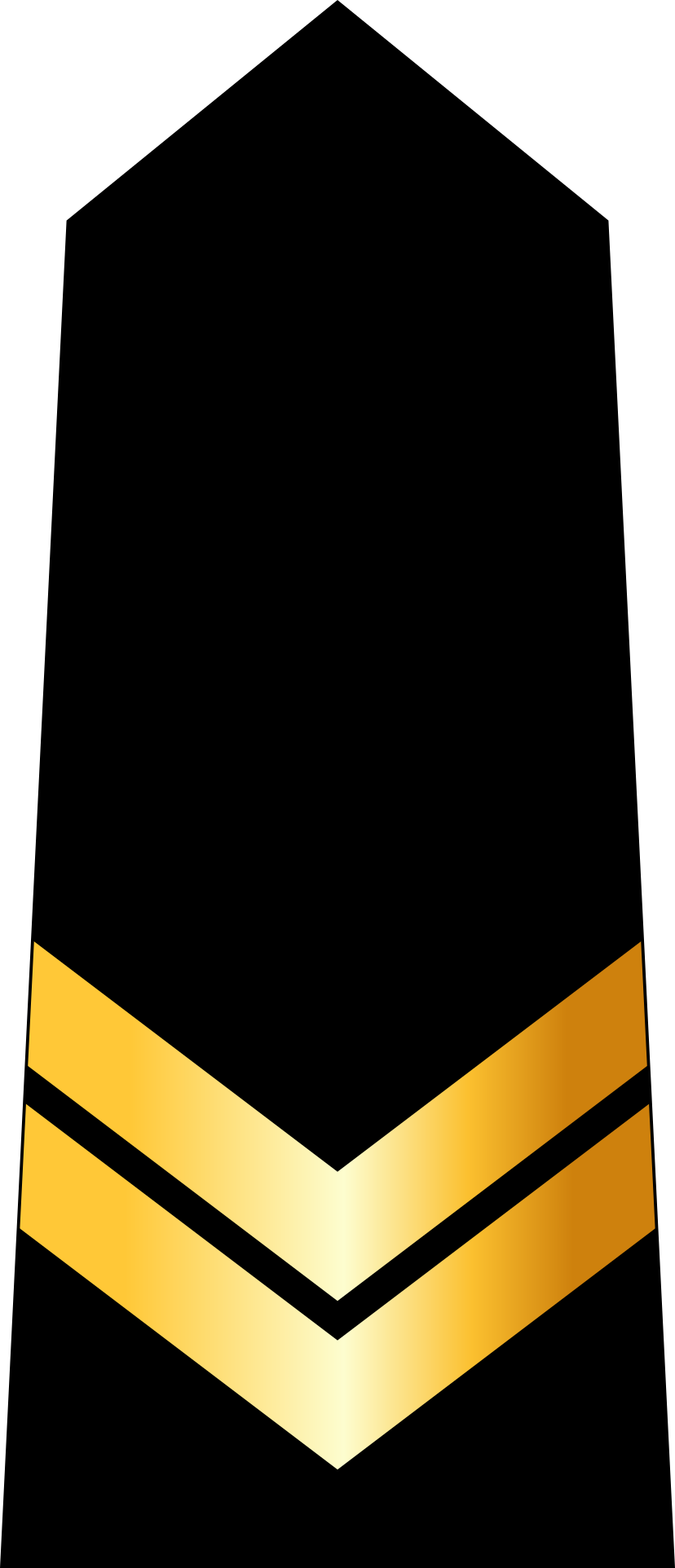
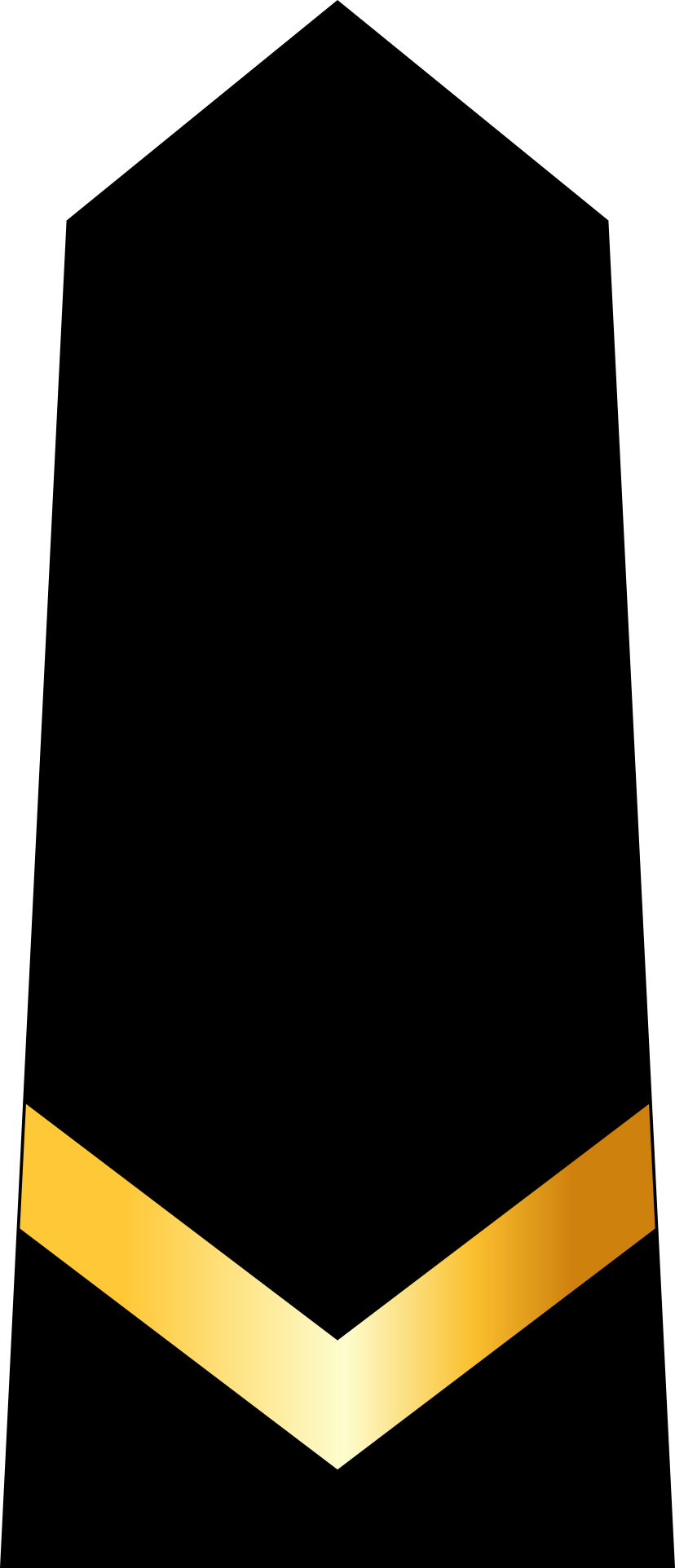
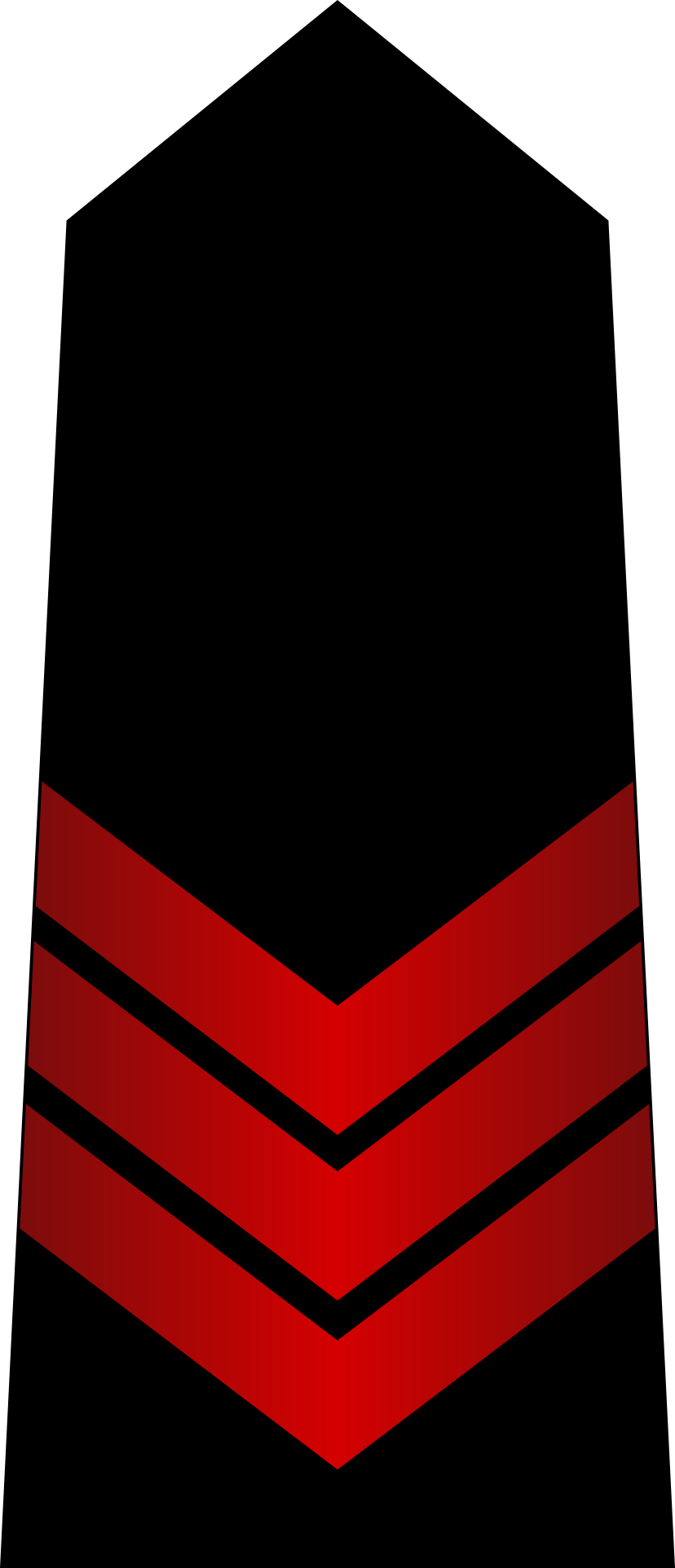
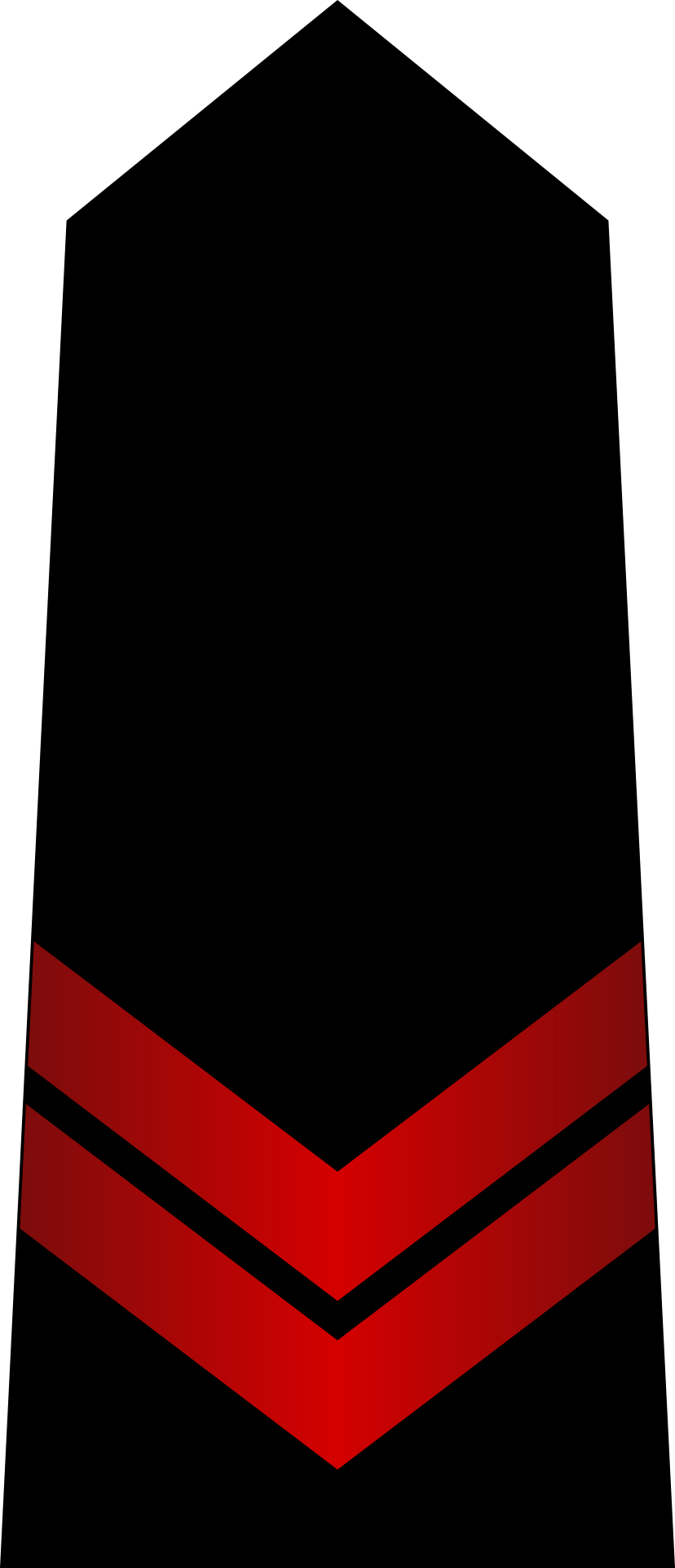
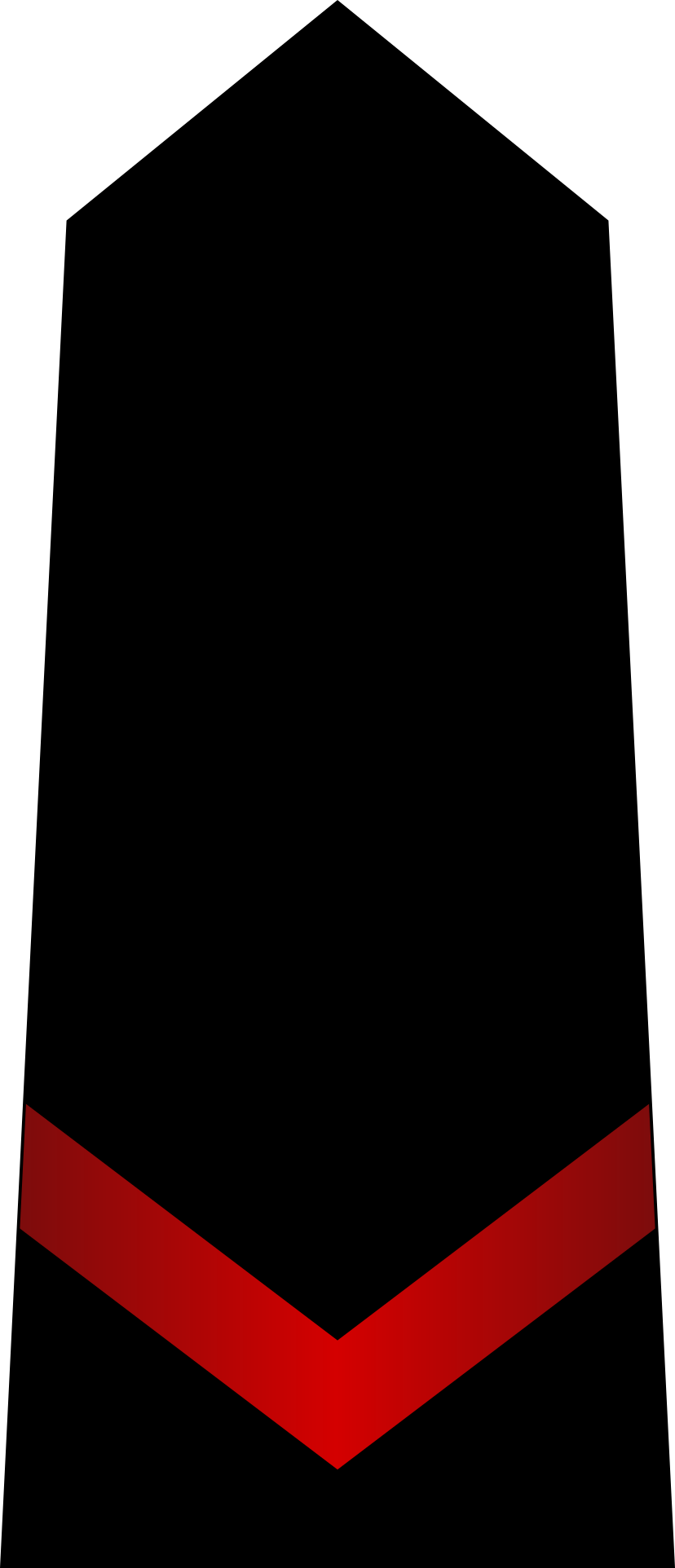
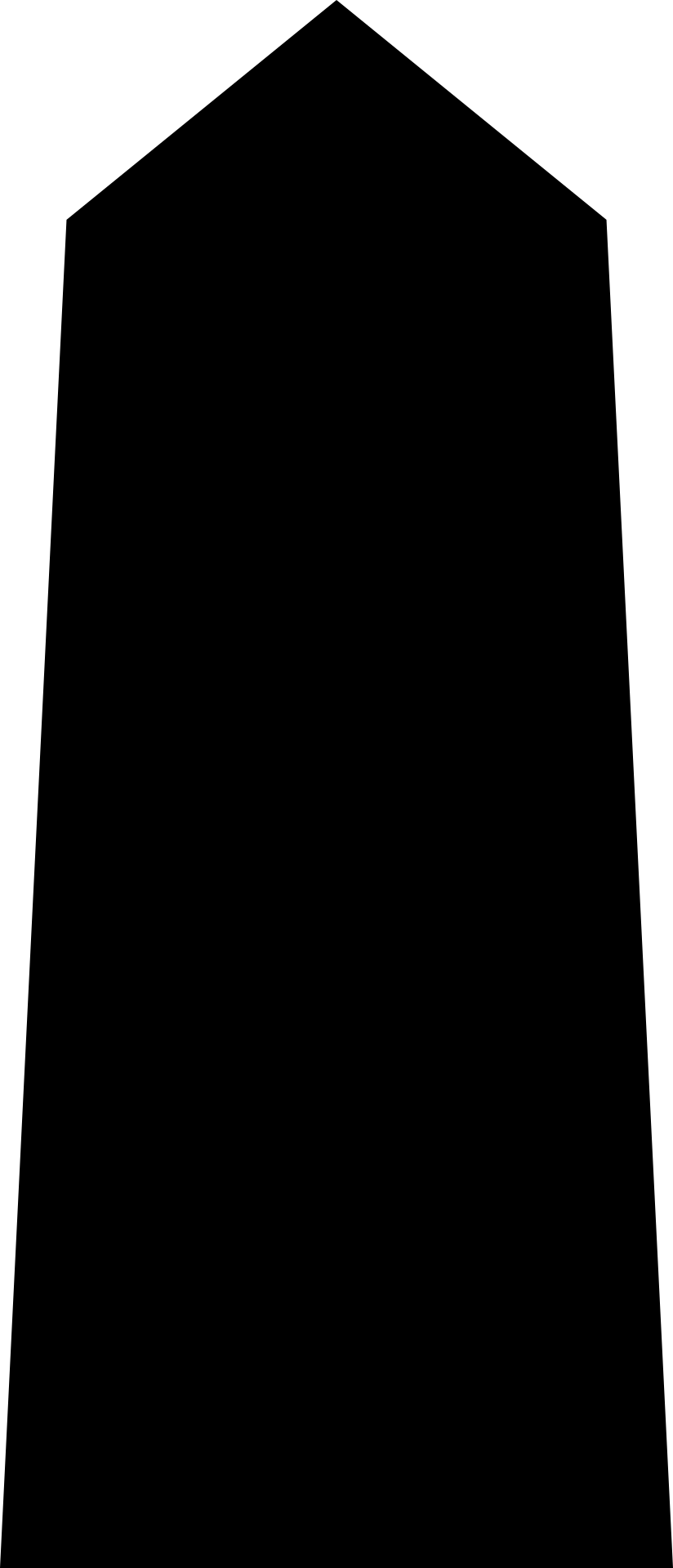
| Rank group | Senior NCOs | | | | | Junior NCOs | | Enlisted |
|---|---|---|---|---|---|---|---|---|---|
| Tunisian National Navy |
| Tunisian National Navy | وكيل أعلى بالبحرية; Wakil 'aelaa bialbaḥria | وكيل أول بالبحرية; Wakil 'awal bialbaḥria | وكيل بالبحرية; Wakil bialbaḥria | عريف أول بالبحرية; Earif 'awal bialbaḥria | عريف بالبحرية; Earif bialbaḥria | رقيب أول بالبحرية; Raqib 'awal bialbaḥria | رقيب بالبحرية; Raqib bialbaḥria | جندي أول بحرية; Jundiun awwal bialbaḥria | جندي متطوع بحرية; Jundiun bialbaḥria |
| Tunisian National Navy | Maître-principal | Premier maître | Maître | Second maître de 1^{ère} classe | Second maître de 2^{ème} classe | Quartier-maitre de 1^{ère} classe | Quartier-maitre de 2^{ème} classe | Matelot breveté | Matelot |

== See also ==
- Tunisian Armed Forces
- List of navies
- Military of Tunisia
