= La Combattante III type fast attack craft =

Ship design

The La Combattante III type patrol boat was a type of fast attack craft built in France for export during the late 1970s and 1980s. The design was a modification of the successful La Combattante II type fast attack craft. Nineteen ships of the design were built in various classes for several navies around the world.

== Development ==
In 1975 Constructions Mécaniques de Normandie (CMN) modified the La Combattante II design, adding nine metres to the length to improve seaworthiness and give more internal space; this gave a displacement of 359 tons and an overall length of 56 metres, though the armament remained the same. This design was designated La Combattante III.

Between 1972 and 1990 a further 19 were built for the navies of Greece, Tunisia, Qatar, and Nigeria. In addition were built for Israel (the Sa'ar 4 class), five in France and the remainder under licence in Israel. The Israelis also built, or assisted in building, nine vessels for South Africa, at the time under embargo for its Apartheid policy.

== Ship list ==
Between 1975 and 1990 nineteen vessels were built for the navies of Greece, Nigeria, Qatar and Tunisia.

=== Greece ===
In 1974 the Hellenic Navy ordered four vessels to be built by Constructions Mécaniques de Normandie (CMN), referred to as the Greek La Combattante IIIa class, and in 1978 a further six vessels to be built under licence in Greece (the La Combattante IIIb class); These were to the same design, but were armed with the Norwegian Penguin Surface-to-surface missile (SSM) instead of the French Exocet.

La Combattante IIIa
Pennant number	Name	Launched	Status
P20	Antiploiarchos Laskos	20 April 1977	Active
P21	Plotarchis Blessas	7 July 1977	Active
P22	Ypoploiarchos Mykonios	10 February 1978	Active
P23	Ypoploiarchos Troupakis	8 November 1977	Active

La Combattante IIIb
Pennant number	Name	Launched	Status
P24	Simaioforos Kavaloudis	14 July 1980	Active
P25	Ypoploiarchos Kostakos	9 September 1980	Accidental loss, November 1996
P26	Ypoploiarchos Degiannis	11 December 1980	Active
P27	Simaioforos Xenos	31 March 1981	Active
P28	Simaioforos Simitzopoulos	30 June 1981	Active
P29	Simaioforos Starakis	12 October 1981	Active

=== Nigeria ===
In November 1977 the Nigerian Navy ordered three vessels from CMN to the modified La Combattante IIIB design. This was slightly larger and faster than the standard La Combattante III design, but with a reduced armament. These were known as the Siri class.

Siri class
Pennant number	Name	Launched	Status
P181	Siri	3 June 1980	.
P182	Ayah	10 November 1980	.
P183	Ekun	11 February 1981	.

=== Qatar ===
In October 1980 the Qatari Emiri Navy ordered three vessels form CMN to the modified La Combattante IIIM design. This was slightly smaller than the standard La Combattante III design, with a reduced armament, but superior performance and electronics.

La Combattante III (Qatari Emiri Navy)
Pennant number	Name	Commissioned	Status
Q 01	Dansah	10 November 1982	Active
Q 02	Al Gharijah	10 February 1983	Active
Q 03	R'Biva	11 May 1983	Active

=== Tunisia ===
In June 1981 the Tunisian Navy ordered three vessels from CMN, also to the modified La Combattante IIIM design.

La Combattante III (Tunisian Navy)
Pennant number	Name	Commissioned	Status
P501	La Galik	27 February 1985	.
P502	Tunis	27 March 1985	.
P503	Carthage	29 April 1985	.

== See also ==
- La Combattante-class fast attack craft
- La Combattante II type fast attack craft
