= Caid Essebsi Cabinet =

- Cabinet of Tunisia

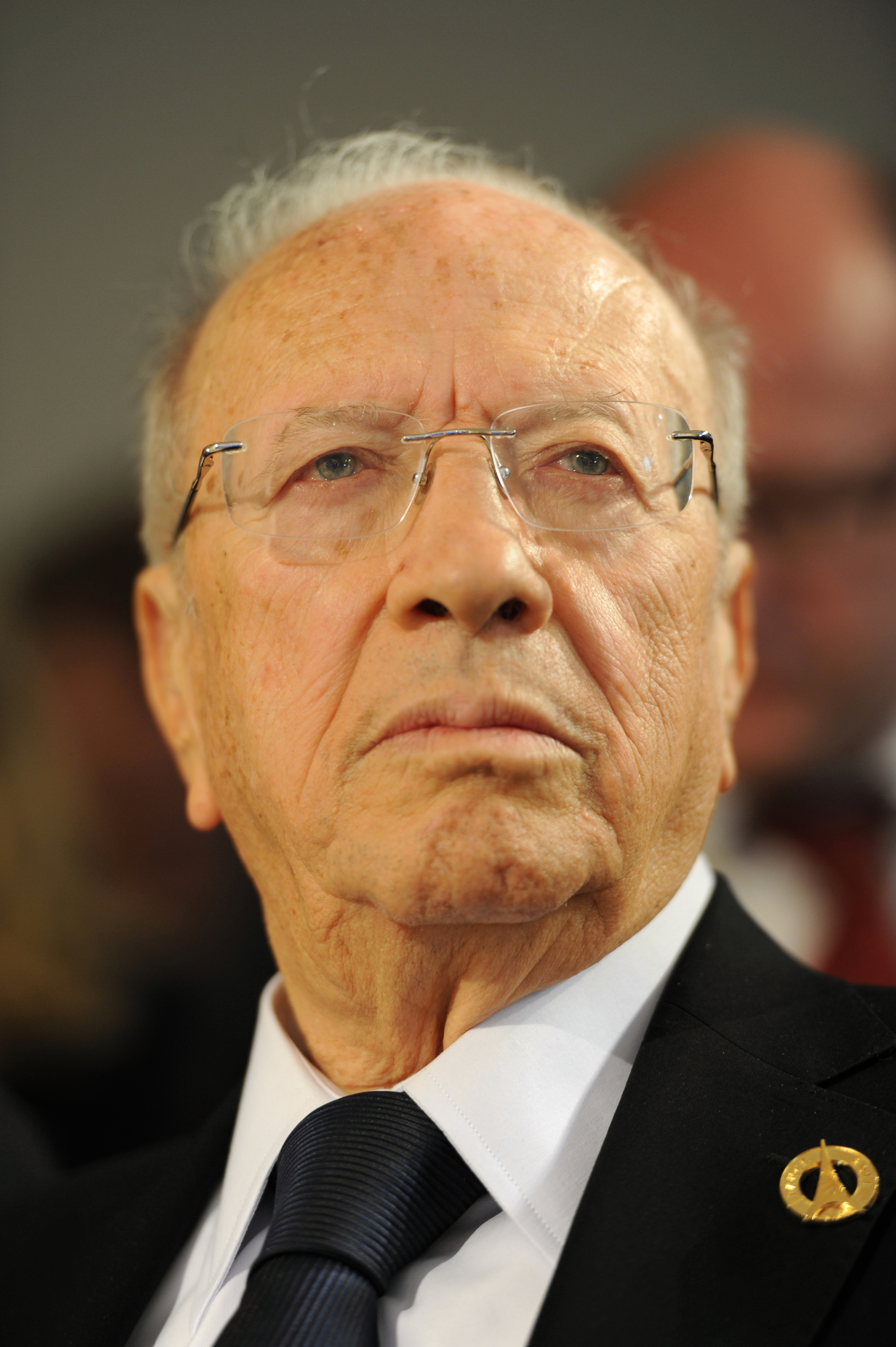
- Date formed: 27 February 2011
- Date dissolved: 24 December 2011 (9 months and 27 days)

People and organisations
- Head of state: Fouad Mebazaa (acting); Moncef Marzouki
- Head of government: Beji Caid Essebsi
- Total no. of members: 32 (incl. Prime Minister)
- Member parties: –
- Status in legislature: Transitional government

History
- Election: –
- Predecessor: Ghannouchi II Cabinet (January – February 2011)
- Successor: Jebali Cabinet

The Caid Essebsi Cabinet was the third government of Tunisia since the ousting of longtime dictator Zine El Abidine Ben Ali in January 2011, during the Tunisian revolution. Presented as a transitional government in March 2011, it replaced the Ghannouchi II Cabinet. It was headed by Prime Minister Beji Caid Essebsi.

== Cabinet members ==
Office	Name	Party
Prime Minister	Beji Caid Essebsi	Independent
Minister of Justice	Lazhar Karoui Chebbi	Independent
Minister of Defence	Abdelkarim Zbidi	Independent
Minister of Interior	Farhat Rajhi	Independent
Minister of Foreign Affairs	Mouldi Kefi	Independent
Minister of Social Affairs	Mohamed Ennaceur	Independent
Minister of Finance	Jalloul Ayed	Independent
Minister of Religious Affairs	Laroussi Mizouri	Independent
Minister of Education and Government Spokesperson	Taïeb Baccouche	Independent
Minister of Culture	Azedine Beschaouch	Independent
Minister of Regional and Local Development	Ahmed Najib Chebbi	PDP
Minister of Higher Education and Scientific Research	Ahmed Brahim	Ettajdid
Minister of Health	Habiba Zéhi Ben Romdhane	Independent
Minister of Commerce and Tourism	Mehdi Houas	Independent
Minister of Agriculture and Environment	Mokhtar Jallali	Independent
Minister of Women affairs	Lilia Labidi	Independent
Minister of Transport and Equipment	Yassine Brahim	Independent
Minister of Employment and Vocational Training	Saïd Aïdi	Independent
Minister of Youth and Sports	Mohamed Aloulou	Independent
Minister of Planning and International Cooperation	Mohamed Nouri Jouini	Independent
Minister of Industry and Technology	Afif Chelbi	RCD
Minister in charge of Economic and Social Reforms and Coordination with the Ministries concerned	Elyès Jouini	Independent
Minister of State Domains	Ahmed Adhoum	Independent
Minister to the head of government	Rafâa Ben Achour	Independent
Secretary of State for Foreign Affairs	Radhouane Nouisser	Independent
Secretary of State for Regional and Local Development	Néjib Karafi	Independent
Secretary of State for Tourism	Slim Chaker	Independent
Secretary of State for the Environment	Salem Hamdi	Independent
Secretary General of the Government	Ridha Belhaj	Independent
Secretary of State for Youth and Sports	Slim Amamou	Independent
Secretary of State for Health	Lamine Moulahi	Independent
Secretary of State for Communication Technologies	Sami Zaoui	Independent
Secretary of State for Education	Hassen Annabi	Independent
Secretary of State for Higher Education	Faouzia Charfi	Independent

== Cabinet as of 1 July 2011 ==
Office	Name	Party
Prime Minister	Beji Caid Essebsi	Independent
Minister of Justice	Lazhar Karoui Chebbi	Independent
Minister of Defence	Abdelkrim Zbidi	Independent
Minister of Interior	Habib Essid	Independent
Minister of Foreign Affairs	Mouldi Kefi	Independent
Minister of Social Affairs	Mohamed Ennaceur	Independent
Minister of Finance	Jalloul Ayed	Independent
Minister of Religious Affairs	Laroussi Mizouri	Independent
Minister of Education and Government Spokesperson	Taïeb Baccouche	Independent
Minister of Culture	Azedine Beschaouch	Independent
Minister of Higher Education and Scientific Research	Refâat Chaâbouni	Independent
Minister of Health	Slaheddine Sellami	Independent
Minister of Commerce and Tourism	Mehdi Houas	Independent
Minister of Agriculture and Environment	Mokhtar Jallali	Independent
Minister of Women affairs	Lilia Labidi	Independent
Minister of Transport	Salem Miladi	Independent
Minister of Equipment	Mohamed Ridha Farès	Independent
Minister of Employment and Vocational Training	Saïd Aïdi	Independent
Minister of Youth and Sports	Slim Chaker	Independent
Minister of Planning and International Cooperation	Abdelhamid Triki	Independent
Minister of Industry and Technology	Abdelaziz Rassâa	Independent
Minister of State Domains	Ahmed Adhoum	Independent
Minister of Regional and Local Development	Abderrazak Zouari	Independent
Minister to the head of government	Ridha Belhaj	Independent
Minister Delegate to the Minister of the Interior in charge of Reforms	Lazhar Akremi	Independent
Secretary General of the Government	Mohamed Salah Ben Aïssa	Independent
Secretary of State for Foreign Affairs	Radhouane Nouisser	Independent
Secretary of State for Foreign Affairs	Khemaies Jhinaoui	Independent
Secretary of State for Regional and Local Development	Néjib Karafi	Independent
Secretary of State for the Environment	Salem Hamdi	Independent
Secretary of State for Communication Technologies	Adel Gaâloul	Independent
Secretary of State for Education	Hassen Annabi	Independent
Secretary of State for Youth and Sports	Myriam Mizouni	Independent
