= Ghannouchi II Cabinet =

- Cabinet of Tunisia

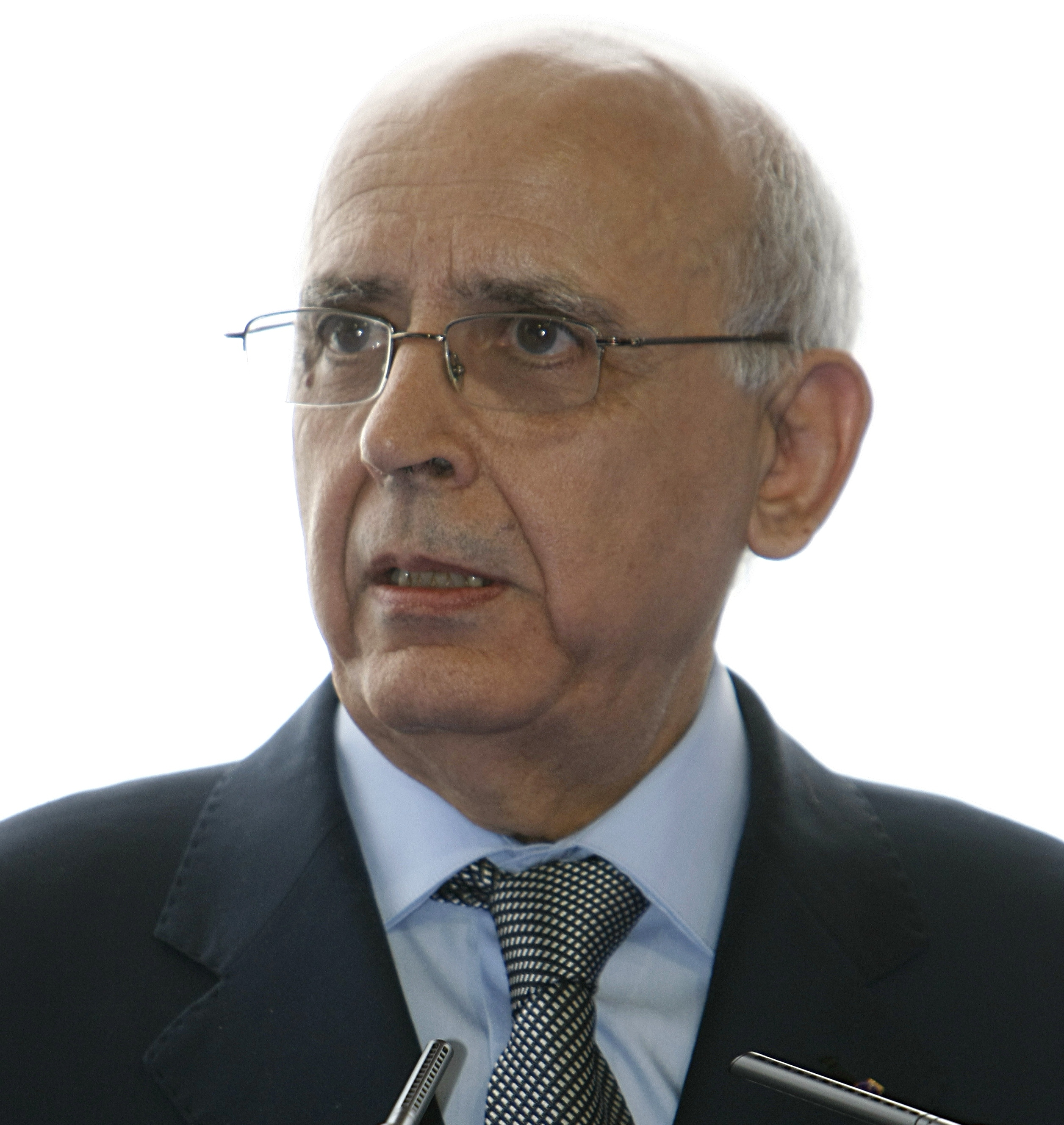
- Date formed: 17 January 2011
- Date dissolved: 27 February 2011 (1 month and 10 days)

People and organisations
- Head of state: Fouad Mebazaa (acting)
- Head of government: Mohamed Ghannouchi
- Total no. of members: 38 (incl. Prime Minister)
- Member parties: RCD, Independents, UGTT (Labour Union), Ettakatol, Ettajdid, PDP, Pirate Party
- Status in legislature: National unity government

History
- Election: –
- Predecessor: Ghannouchi I Cabinet (1999–2011)
- Successor: Caid Essebsi Cabinet

During the Tunisian Revolution President Zine El Abidine Ben Ali fled Tunisia on 14 January 2011 Prime Minister Mohamed Ghannouchi then briefly took over as Acting President. On the morning of 15 January 2011 Ghannouchi handed over the presidency to Speaker of the Chamber of Deputies Fouad Mebazaa. This was done after the head of Tunisia's Constitutional Council, Fethi Abdennadher declared that Ghannouchi did not have the right to hold power and confirmed Fouad Mebazaa as acting president under Article 57 of the 1959 Constitution. Ghannouchi, returning to his previous position as prime minister, was confirmed as prime minister by Mebazaa and formed a new national unity government on 17 January 2011 that included members of opposition parties, civil society representatives, and even a blogger who only a week earlier had been imprisoned by the regime of the deposed president. On 27 February 2011 the government was dissolved and replaced by a new government led by Beji Caid Essebsi.

== Cabinet members ==
As of 17 January, members included:

Office	Name	Party
Prime Minister	Mohamed Ghannouchi	RCD
Minister of Justice	Lazhar Karoui Chebbi	Independent
Minister of Defence	Ridha Grira	RCD
Minister of Foreign Affairs	Kamel Morjane	RCD
Minister of Interior	Ahmed Friaa	RCD
Minister of Religious Affairs	Laroussi Mizouri	Independent
Minister of Regional and Local Development	Ahmed Najib Chebbi	PDP
Minister of Higher Education and Scientific Research	Ahmed Brahim	Ettajdid
Minister of Health	Mustapha Ben Jaafar	Ettakatol
Minister of Commerce and Tourism	Mohamed Jegham	RCD
Minister of Education	Taïeb Baccouche	Independent
Minister of Social Affairs	Moncer Rouissi	RCD
Minister of Agriculture and the Environment	Habib M'barek	RCD
Minister of Planning and International Cooperation	Mohamed Nouri Jouini	Independent
Minister of Industry and Technology	Afif Chelbi	Independent
Minister of Finance	Ridha Chalghoum	RCD
Minister of Culture	Moufida Tlatli	Independent
Minister of Women's Affairs	Lilia Labidi	Independent
Minister of Transport and Equipment	Slaheddine Malouche	RCD
Minister of Training and Employment	Houssine Dimassi	UGTT
Minister of Youth and Sports	Mohamed Aloulou	Independent
Minister to the Prime Minister	Abdeljelil Bédoui	UGTT
Minister in charge of Administrative Development	Zouheir M'dhaffer	RCD
Secretary of State for Foreign Affairs	Ahmed Ounaies	Independent
Secretary of State for Foreign Affairs	Radhouane Nouisser	Independent
Secretary of State for Regional and Local Development	Néjib Karafi	Independent
Secretary of State for Higher Education	Faouzia Charfi	Independent
Secretary of State for Scientific Research	Refâat Chaâbouni	RCD
Secretary of State for Health	Lamine Moulahi	Independent
Secretary of State for Planning and International Cooperation	Abdelhamid Triki	RCD
Secretary of State for Energy	Abdelaziz Rassâa	RCD
Secretary of State for Communication Technologies	Sami Zaoui	Independent
Secretary of State for Taxation	Moncef Bouden	RCD
Secretary of State in charge of State Domains	Ahmed Adhoum	Independent
Secretary of State for Tourism	Slim Chaker	Independent
Secretary of State for Transport and Equipment	Anouar Ben Gueddour	UGTT
Secretary of State for Agriculture and Environment	Salem Hamdi	Independent
Secretary of State for Youth and Sports	Slim Amamou (Note: The first time in the world that a Pirate Party member ascends to a governmental post.)	Pirate Party

== Resignations ==
=== Ministers from the opposition ===
On 18 January 2011 the three ministers of the Tunisian General Labor Union (UGTT), Houssine Dimassi, Abdeljelil Bédoui and Anouar Ben Gueddour, resigned. The same day, Mustapha Ben Jaafar, from Ettakatol, also resigned. they all stated that they had "no confidence" in a government featuring members of the RCD.

=== RCD members ===
Following the various protests that occurred after the formation of this government, Prime Minister Mohamed Ghannouchi and interim president Fouad Mebazaa announced that they are no longer members of the Democratic Constitutional Rally. On 20 January the other ministers who were still members of the RCD announced that they had done the same: they were Kamel Morjane, Ridha Grira, Ahmed Friaâ, Moncer Rouissi and Zouheir M'dhaffer. The same day M'Dhaffer a close confidant of Ben Ali in charge of Administrative Development also resigned from his ministerial post. Kamel Morjane resigned from the government on 27 January a few hours before the government reshuffle.

== Reshuffle of 27 January ==
Following protests against the presence of RCD members in important positions and the resignation of several ministers, the government was reshuffled on 27 January 2011. The UGTT decided not to participate but supported the new government.

=== Cabinet members ===
Office	Name	Party
Prime Minister	Mohamed Ghannouchi	Independent
Minister of Defence	Abdelkrim Zbidi	Independent
Minister of Foreign Affairs	Ahmed Ounaies	Independent
Minister of Interior	Farhat Rajhi	Independent
Minister of Justice	Lazhar Karoui Chebbi	Independent
Minister of Religious Affairs	Laroussi Mizouri	Independent
Minister of Regional and Local Development	Ahmed Najib Chebbi	PDP
Minister of Education	Taïeb Baccouche	Independent
Minister of Higher Education and Scientific Research	Ahmed Brahim	Ettajdid
Minister of Health	Habiba Zéhi Ben Romdhane	Independent
Minister of Commerce and Tourism	Mehdi Houas	Independent
Minister of Social Affairs	Mohamed Ennaceur	Independent
Minister of Agriculture and Environment	Mokhtar Jallali	Independent
Minister of Planning and International Cooperation	Mohamed Nouri Jouini	Independent
Minister of Industry and Technology	Afif Chelbi	Independent
Minister of Justice	Jalloul Ayed	Independent
Minister of Culture	Azedine Beschaouch	Independent
Minister of Women's Affairs	Lilia Labidi	Independent
Minister of Transport and Equipment	Yassine Brahim	Independent
Minister of Training and Employment	Saïd Aïdi	Independent
Minister of Youth and Sports	Mohamed Aloulou	Independent
Minister in charge of Economic and Social Reforms and Coordination with the Ministries concerned	Elyès Jouini	Independent
Secretary of State for Foreign Affairs	Radhouane Nouisser	Independent
Secretary of State for Regional and Local Development	Néjib Karafi	Independent
Secretary of State for Higher Education	Faouzia Charfi	Independent
Secretary of State for Health	Refâat Chaâbouni	RCD
Secretary of State for Health	Lamine Moulahi	Independent
Secretary of State for Planning and International Cooperation	Abdelhamid Triki	RCD
Secretary of State for Communication Technologies	Sami Zaoui	Independent
Secretary of State in charge of State Domains	Ahmed Adhoum	Independent
Secretary of State for Tourism	Slim Chaker	Independent
Secretary of State for Agriculture and Environment	Salem Hamdi	Independent
Secretary of State for Youth and Sports	Slim Amamou	Pirate Party

=== Other changes ===
On 10 February 2011 Ridha Belhaj was sworn in as Secretary of State to the Prime Minister. Foreign Minister Ahmed Ounaies resigns on 13 February 2011 following his remarks on the revolution, he had hailed Minister of Europe and Foreign Affairs of France Michèle Alliot-Marie as " friend of Tunisia", while the minister was summoned at the same time to explain herself in France for having offered the regime of Ben Ali the "know-how" of the French police to quell the protests when the repression was in full swing. He was replaced by Mouldi Kefi on 21 February 2011.

== Resignation of the Prime Minister ==
Protests flared on 19 February, with 40,000 protesters demanding a new interim government completely free of association with the old regime, and a parliamentary system of government replacing the current presidential one. As a date was announced for an election in mid-July 2011, more than 100,000 protesters demanded the removal of Ghannouchi. On 27 February, following two days of demonstrations marked by violence in the capital in which five protesters were killed and twelve injured. Ghannouchi announced his resignation on state television, He stated that he had carried his responsibilities since Ben Ali fled, and "I am not ready to be the person who takes decisions that would end up causing casualties. This resignation will serve Tunisia, and the revolution and the future of Tunisia", he added.

Following him the ministers Ahmed Néjib Chebbi, Ahmed Brahim, Elyès Jouini, Afif Chelbi and Mohamed Nouri Jouini also announced their resignation.

Ghannouchi was replaced as prime minister the same day by Beji Caid Essebsi.
