= Mohamed Aloulou =

Tunisian cardiologist and politician

Minister of Youth and Sports
- In office 17 January 2011 – 1 July 2011
- President: Fouad Mebazaa (interim)
- Prime Minister: Mohamed Ghannouchi; Béji Caïd Essebsi
- Preceded by: Abdelhamid Slama
- Succeeded by: Slim Chaker

Personal details
- Born: November 19, 1941 (age 84) Gabès, Tunisia
- Party: Nidaa Tounes
- Education: University of Strasbourg
- Occupation: Cardiologist

Mohamed Aloulou (19 November 1941) is a Tunisian cardiologist and politician. He was Minister of Youth and Sports from 17 January - 1 July 2011 in the second cabinet of Mohamed Ghannouchi and continued in the same role in the following Essebsi Cabinet.

== Biography ==
=== Family and education ===
Born 19 November 1941 in Sfax, Aloulou studied at the University of Strasbourg, in the Faculty of Medicine. After graduating with a degree in cardiology, Aloulou settled in Sfax. From 2004 to 2010, he was vice-president of the Conseil national de l'Ordre des médecins. After graduating as a specialist in cardiology, he returned to Sfax to open his own clinic in his specialty.

=== Sporting career ===
In 1989 and 1990, he was president of the football club CS Sfaxien.

=== Political career ===
He was Vice President of Sports in the city of Sfax from 1975 to 1980 and of Culture from 1985 to 1990. Between 1996 and 2010, he was vice president of the Association de protection de la nature et de l'environnement of Sfax.

During the 2011 Tunisian protests, he was named Minister of Youth and Sports in the Second cabinet of Mohamed Ghannouchi and the later Essebsi Cabinet. Slim Amamou was for a time his Secretary of State.

On 4 October 2013, he announced his support of the Nidaa Tounes party.

== Personal life ==
Aloulou is married with four children.
