= Mohamed Ennaceur =

Tunisian politician and acting president in 2019

His Excellency Mohamed Ennaceur
- محمد الناصر
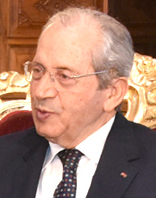
- Pictured in 2019

Acting President of Tunisia
- In office 25 July 2019 – 23 October 2019
- Prime Minister: Youssef Chahed
- Preceded by: Beji Caid Essebsi
- Succeeded by: Kais Saied

Speaker of the Assembly of the Representatives of the People
- In office 4 December 2014 – 25 July 2019
- President: Moncef Marzouki; Beji Caid Essebsi
- Prime Minister: Mehdi Jomaa; Habib Essid; Youssef Chahed
- Preceded by: Mustapha Ben Jafar
- Succeeded by: Abdelfattah Mourou (interim)

President of Nidaa Tounes
- In office 31 December 2014 – 28 May 2019
- Preceded by: Beji Caid Essebsi
- Succeeded by: Selma Elloumi Rekik

Minister of Labour and Social Affairs
- In office 27 January 2011 – 24 December 2011
- President: Fouad Mebazaa (Acting); Moncef Marzouki
- Prime Minister: Mohamed Ghannouchi; Beji Caid Essebsi
- Preceded by: Moncer Rouissi
- Succeeded by: Khalil Zaouia
- In office 7 November 1979 – 23 October 1985
- President: Habib Bourguiba
- Prime Minister: Hédi Nouira; Mohamed Mzali
- Preceded by: Mohamed Jomâa
- Succeeded by: Noureddine Hached
- In office 14 January 1974 – 26 December 1977
- President: Habib Bourguiba
- Prime Minister: Hédi Nouira
- Preceded by: Farhat Dachraoui
- Succeeded by: Mohamed Jomâa

Personal details
- Born: 21 March 1934 (age 92) El Djem, French Tunisia
- Party: Nidaa Tounes
- Spouse: Siren Mønstre
- Children: 5
- Education: University of Tunis; Paris-Sorbonne University

Mohamed Ennaceur (Arabic: محمد الناصر; born 21 March 1934) is a Tunisian politician who served as the acting president of Tunisia for 91 days, from President Beji Caid Essebsi's death on 25 July 2019 until he handed over the presidency to Kais Saied as the winner of the 2019 Tunisian presidential election on 23 October 2019. Since 2014, he has also been the President of the Assembly of the Representatives of the People and leader of the governing Nidaa Tounes party. Previously, he served as Minister of Social Affairs in the 1970s and 1980s under President Habib Bourguiba and again in 2011 in the transitional Ghannouchi and Essebsi governments.

Ennaceur was the founding director of the Tunisian Association of Social Law (Revue tunisienne de droit social) and the Festival international de musique symphonique d'El Jem.

On 4 December 2014, he was elected as President of the Assembly of the Representatives of the People, with 176 agreeing votes out of 214 present MPs. Upon President Beji Caid Essebsi's death, Ennaceur ascended as president according to the Constitutional provision for the presidential succession of Tunisia.

== Career ==
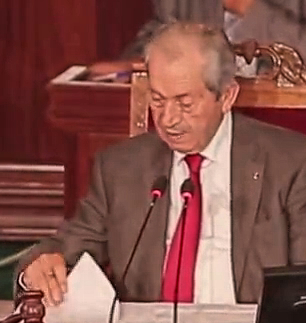
Ennaceur during his presidency of a parliamentary session.

Mohamed Ennaceur earned a diploma from the Institut des Hautes Études de Tunis and a doctorate in social law from the University of Paris 1 Pantheon-Sorbonne. His thesis dealt with the International Labour Organization and the development of social law in Tunisia and Libya.

Early in his career he served on the board of UNICEF (1963–64) and the United Nations Research Institute for Social Development (1966–72). He was Commissioner-General of the Office for Tunisian Workers Overseas (1973–74), chaired the World Employment Conference (1976) and the Arab League Social Affairs Bureau (1980–83). Between 1991 and 1996 he went on to serve as coordinator of the African group in the World Trade Organization and led the Tunisian permanent mission to the United Nations in Geneva. From 2000 he worked as a corporate social responsibility auditor and international consultant. In 2005 he became the coordinator for the United Nations Global Compact in Tunisia.

In addition to his international career, Mohamed Ennaceur held a number of political appointments in Tunisia. He served as governor of Sousse 1972–73 and as Minister of Social Affairs twice, from 1974 to 1977 and from 1979 to 1985. After the Tunisian Revolution of 2011 he was once again appointed Minister of Social Affairs in the governments of Mohamed Ghannouchi and Beji Caid Essebsi.

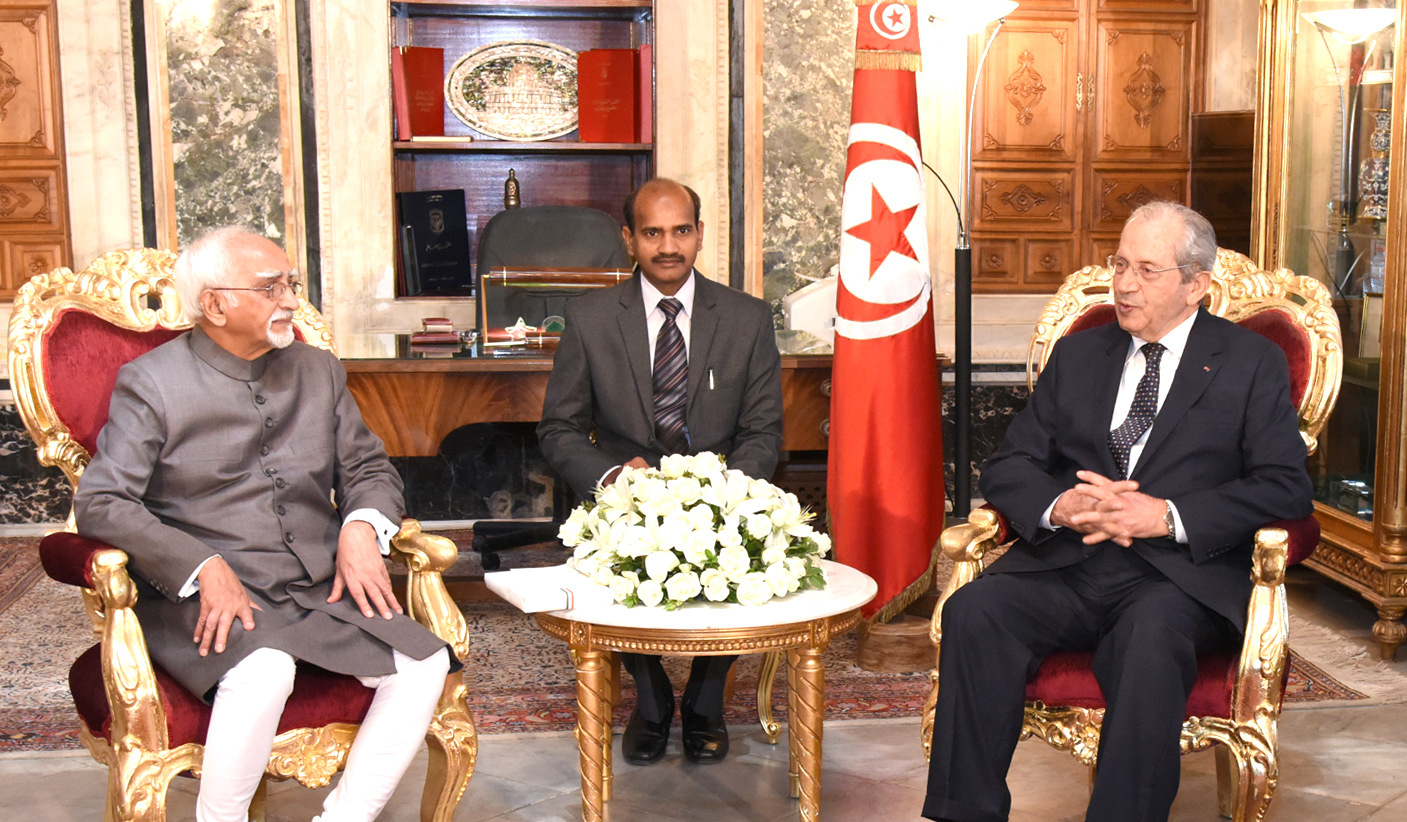
Ennaceur with the Vice President of India, Hamid Ansari, in 2016.

In February 2014, he joined the Nidaa Tounes party, becoming its vice-president. On 4 December 2014, he was elected President (Speaker) of the Assembly of the Representatives of the People, securing 176 votes out of a possible 217, and becoming the first President of the Chamber after the adoption of the Tunisian Constitution of 2014. On 31 December, after Béji Caïd Essebsi became President of the Republic, he succeeded him as interim head of the Nidaa Tounes party.

Soon after Essebsi's death on 25 July, Ennaceur announced in a nationwide address that in accordance with the Constitution, he was now acting president. According to Article 84 of the Tunisian constitution, an acting president may serve in their role for a maximum of 90 days, meaning Ennaceur's role is due to expire on 23 October 2019. Although presidential elections were already scheduled for 17 November, the Independent High Authority for Elections advanced the date to 15 September to ensure that a permanent successor would be in office by 23 October.

== Personal life ==
Mohamed Ennaceur is married to Siren Mønstre, a Norwegian national from Bergen. They met when they were students in Paris and have been married for over 60 years. They have five children.

== Health ==
In late July 2019, shortly after the death of his predecessor, Beji Caid Essebsi, Ennaceur was reported to be in poor health.

== Honours ==
=== Tunisian national honours ===
- Tunisia:
- Grand Cordon of the Order of Independence.
- Grand Cordon of the Order of the Republic.
- Gold Labour Medal.

=== Foreign honors ===
- Belgium : Grand Cordon in the Order of Leopold.
- France : Grand officer of the National Order of Merit.
- Germany : Commander of the Order of Merit of the Federal Republic of Germany.
- Ivory Coast : Grand officer of the National Order of the Ivory Coast.
- Luxembourg : Grand Cross in the Order of Merit of the Grand Duchy of Luxembourg.
- Netherlands : Knight Grand Cross in the Order of Orange-Nassau.
- United Kingdom : Honorary Knight Commander of the Order of the British Empire.

== Publications ==
- Deux Républiques, une Tunisie, Tunis, ed. Leaders, 2021. ISBN 978-9973-9886-6-9.

Political offices
| Preceded by Beji Caid Essebsi | President of Tunisia; Acting; 2019 | Succeeded by Kais Saied |
