= Ridha Belhaj =

Ridha Belhaj is the name of:

- Ridha Belhaj (politician), Tunisian lawyer and politician of secularist Nidaa Tounes party (born 1962)
- Ridha Belhaj (activist), Tunisian activist and spokesman of Islamist Hizb ut-Tahrir organization.
