= Ahmed Ounaies =

Tunisian politician

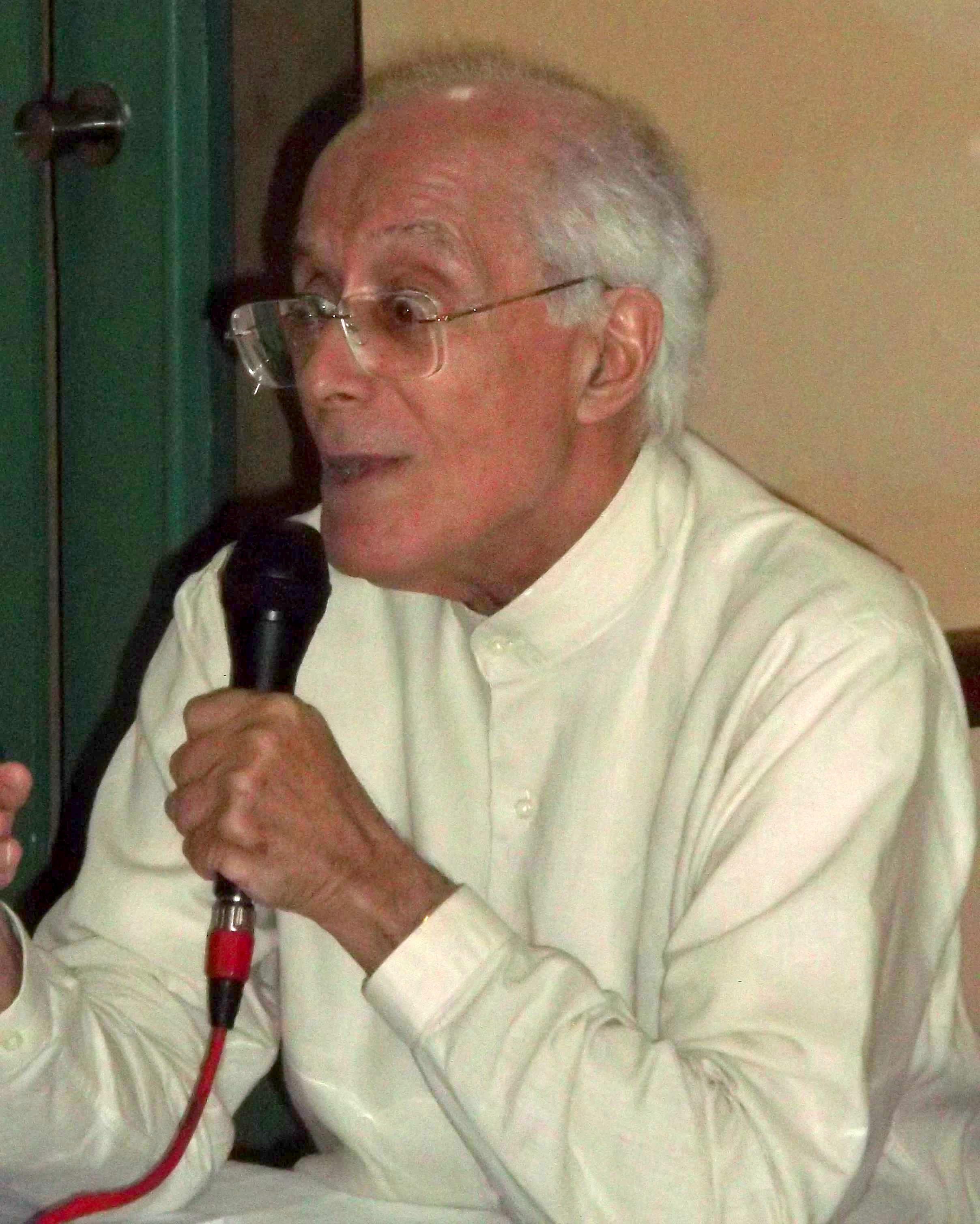

Minister of Foreign Affairs of Tunisia
- In office 27 January 2011 – 13 February 2011
- President: Fouad Mebazaa (Acting)
- Prime Minister: Mohamed Ghannouchi
- Preceded by: Kamel Morjane
- Succeeded by: Mouldi Kefi

Personal details
- Born: 25 January 1936 (age 90) Tunis, Tunisia

Ahmed Ounaies (born 25 January 1936), also spelled Ahmed Ounaiss, is a Tunisian politician and diplomat who was Foreign Minister for two weeks in the transitional government established after the 2010–2011 Tunisian uprising. Public pressure forced him to resign a week after controversially praising French Minister Michèle Alliot-Marie, who openly supported Ben Ali and helped deliver tear gas to police forces.

His predecessor who was Ben Ali's foreign minister — Kamel Morjane — had also resigned from his post. His successor — Mouldi Kefi — was appointed on 21 February 2011.

== Minister of Foreign Affairs ==
On January 29, after a week of protests in Egypt he said Tunisia and Egypt are different and both must "chart their own course". He also emphasized that Tunisia was not going to involve itself in Egypt.

=== Controversy and resignation ===
During his trip to Paris, he angered many Tunisians by stating he had always dreamed of meeting French Foreign Minister Alliot-Marie. He went on to praise her by stating she was "above all a friend of Tunisia". In Tunis, about 300 employees of the foreign ministry staged a protest rally outside their workplace to demand that he step down after his comments. Hundreds more joined the protest.

After only two weeks as foreign minister, he resigned on 13 February 2011.

=== Honours ===
- 2018 : Grand officier of the National Order of Merit of Tunisia

== See also ==
- Government Mohamed Ghannouchi
