= Lazhar Karoui Chebbi =

Tunisian lawyer and politician

- الأزهر القروي الشابي

Personal details
- Born: Karoui Lazhar Chebbi; 7 October 1927 Tozeur, French Tunisia
- Party: Nidaa Tounes
- Education: University of Ez-Zitouna
- Profession: Lawyer, Politician

Karoui Lazhar Chebbi (born 7 October 1927 in Tozeur) is a Tunisian lawyer and politician. He became Minister of Justice in the government of Mohamed Ghannouchi. He was a member of the secular political party Nidaa Tounes.

He studied first in Tozeur, then at the University of Ez-Zitouna in Tunis, where he qualified as a lawyer in 1954.

== Biography ==
Chebbi was born on 7 October 1927 in Chebbia neighborhood in Tozeur where he also finished his primary school education and then studied in Ez-Zitouna of Tunis. He graduated from the Tunis School of Law in 1954 and worked as a clerk at the Tunis Court of First Instance and as a lawyer from 7 October 1956 until his appointment as Minister of Justice in 2011.

Chebbi was appointed on January 17, 2011 as Minister of Justice in the government of national unity formed following the departure of the President of the Republic, Zine el-Abidine Ben Ali. He announced on January 26 that an international arrest warrant had just been issued against Ben Ali, his wife Leila and members of the Trabelsi clan.

After leaving the government, he joined Nidaa Tounes launched by Beji Caid Essebsi and became responsible for legal relations.

On February 2, 2015, he was appointed Personal Representative of the President of the Republic Beji Caid Essebsi.

Chebbi also chairs the Tunisian Association for the Promotion of Legal Studies. He was one of the founders of the Association of Arab Maghreb Lawyers in Algiers in 1970. He has also worked in the Arab Lawyers Union and the International Union of Lawyers.

== See also ==
- Government Mohamed Ghannouchi
- 2010–2011 Tunisian uprising
