= Mohamed Nejib Berriche =

Tunisian politician (died 2021)

Secretary of State for Housing and Regional Development
- In office 13 March 2006 – 17 January 2011
- Preceded by: position created
- Succeeded by: Anouar Ben Gueddour

Member of the Chamber of Deputies of Tunisia
- In office 2004–2009
- Constituency: Tunis' 2nd constituency

Personal details
- Died: 2 July 2021
- Party: RCD

Mohamed Nejib Berriche (died 2 July 2021) was a Tunisian politician. He served as Secretary of State for Housing and Regional Development within the Ministry of Equipment, Housing and Land Development from 2006 to 2011 under Ministers Samira Khayach Belhaj and Slaheddine Malouche.

== Biography ==
Berriche graduated from the Carthage High Commercial Studies Institute and joined the Urban Rehabilitation and Renovation Agency under Ali Chaouch. In 1991, he was appointed deputy secretary general of the coordination committee Democratic Constitutional Rally in La Marsa, and subsequently became secretary general in 1996. He served in the Chamber of Deputies from 2004 to 2009 and became Secretary of State for Housing and Regional Development from 2006 to 2011. He also served as Mayor of La Marsa.

Mohamed Nejib Berriche died on 2 July 2021, from COVID-19.
