= Moncer Rouissi =

Tunisian politician (1940–2021)

Ambassador of Tunisia to France
- In office 4 November 2003 – 27 August 2005
- Preceded by: Faïza Kefi
- Succeeded by: Mohamed Raouf Najar

Personal details
- Born: 9 September 1940 Degache, French Tunisia
- Died: 5 January 2021 (aged 80) Tunis, Tunisia
- Party: RCD

Moncer Rouissi (9 September 1940 – 5 January 2021) was a Tunisian politician and diplomat.

== Biography ==
Rouissi studied sociology, literature, and social sciences at the University of Toulouse. He then earned a degree in demography at the University of Paris 1 Pantheon-Sorbonne, as well as a doctorate in sociology at the School for Advanced Studies in the Social Sciences. He became a senior executive for the Union générale des étudiants de Tunisie in Toulouse and Paris. As a member of the union, he attended conferences put on by the likes of Alain Touraine, Pierre Bourdieu, Raymond Aron, Georges Gurvitch, and Jacques Berque.

Rouissi returned to Tunisia in 1966 and joined the Centre d'études et de recherches économiques et sociales, where he wrote numerous articles and collective works and contributed to scientific studies. He wrote essays such as Une oasis du Sud tunisien, le Jarid, Essai d'histoire sociale and Population et société au Maghreb. In 1979, the United Nations sent him on a 13-month mission to Syria, and then a mission to Morocco from 1980 to 1983.

In 1987, when Zine El Abidine Ben Ali came to power, he made Rouissi his advisor. He accompanied Ben Ali on his first trip to France in 1988 and to the United Nations in 1989. He became the campaign manager for Ben Ali in the 1989 Tunisian general election. He was subsequently appointed Minister of Social Affairs, a position he held until 1991. He then became Minister of Culture for eight months and thereafter was a minister-advisor to the President. He also served as Minister of Vocational Training and Employment and Minister of Education.

On 29 September 2003, Rouissi was appointed Ambassador of Tunisia to France. After holding this position, he served in the Chamber of Advisors and became President of the Higher Committee for Human Rights and Fundamental Freedoms. He was also a member of the central committee of the Democratic Constitutional Rally from July 2003 until its dissolution on 9 March 2011.

Alongside Salah Baccari, Rouissi wrote President Ben Ali's final speech, given on 13 January 2011 just before the end of the Tunisian Revolution. Rouissi's appointment of the Second cabinet of Mohamed Ghannouchi angered the population of Tunisia greatly. He officially left the Democratic Constitutional Party on 20 January 2011, and left the government one week later.

Moncer Rouissi died on 5 January 2021 at the age of 80 from COVID-19.
