= Laroussi Mizouri =

Tunisian politician

Laroussi Mizouri (born May 6, 1950) is a Tunisian politician. He was appointed minister of religious affairs in the government of Mohamed Ghannouchi.

== See also ==
- Ghannouchi II Cabinet
