= Mouldi Kefi =

Tunisian politician and diplomat

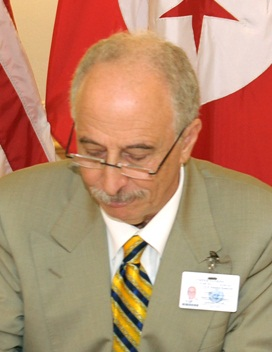

Minister of Foreign Affairs of Tunisia
- In office 21 February 2011 – 23 December 2011
- President: Fouad Mebazaa (Acting)
- Prime Minister: Mohamed Ghannouchi; Béji Caïd Essebsi
- Preceded by: Ahmed Ounaies
- Succeeded by: Rafik Abdessalem

Personal details
- Born: February 10, 1946 (age 80) Le Kef, Tunisia
- Education: Strasbourg University

Mohamed Mouldi Kefi (born February 10, 1946, in Le Kef, Tunisia) was the Minister of Foreign Affairs of Tunisia under the transitional government in 2011, and is a retired diplomat. He is married and has four children.

== Biography ==
Kefi has a degree in philosophy from the Strasbourg University in France.

His diplomatic career started within the Ministry of Foreign Affairs, where he held various positions: head of the Central and South America department (1978), head of the diplomatic protocol department (1980), deputy director of the Americas department (1989), chief of staff of Minister Habib Ben Yahia (1994), project manager in the minister's office (1999) and director general of political affairs and cooperation for the countries of America and Asia (2006).

He was the Ambassador of Tunisia in Czechoslovakia in 1971, where he met his wife, Dagmar. Then, he was accredited to East Germany, the Soviet Union, the United Kingdom, Nigeria (1990-1994), Russia (1996-1999) and Indonesia (2002-2005).

He retired in 2006 when he was 60 years old, but returned after the Tunisian revolution as Minister of Foreign Affairs, under first Mohamed Ghannouchi then Caïd Essebsi.
