= Lilia Labidi =

Politician from Tunisia

- Born: 1949 (age 76–77); Radès, Tunisia
- Occupations: Anthropologist; Politician

Academic background
- Education: Paris Diderot University

Lilia Labidi (Arabic: ليليا العبيدي) (born 1949) is a Tunisian anthropologist, feminist and politician. She was Minister of Women's Affairs, from January 17 to December 24, 2011, in the government of Mohamed Ghannouchi, and of Béji Caïd Essebsi.

== Life ==
Lilia Labidi studied at the Paris Diderot University and obtained a doctorate in psychology in 1978 and a doctorate of state in anthropology in 1986.

She was a lecturer in Clinical Psychology at the Faculty of Humanities and Social Sciences, Tunis, Institute for Advanced Study in Princeton, New Jersey, and George Washington University's Woodrow Wilson International Center.

A committed feminist, she writes several books on the subject. She is a member of the Tunisian Women's Association for Development Research; she is a member of its steering committee in 1989.

Following the 2011 revolution, Labidi was appointed Minister of Women's Affairs in the national unity government of Mohamed Ghannouchi and then in that of Béji Caïd Essebsi. She says she has faith in the revolution and does not consider her feminist views as confining her to a ministry dealing with women's affairs: "I would have been called upon to do anything for the service of women. democracy, pluralism and a better Tunisia, which I would have accepted without hesitation ".

She is a Global Fellow at the Woodrow Wilson International Center for Scholars. In 2016–2017, she was a Fellow at the Swedish Collegium for Advanced Study in Uppsala, Sweden.
