= Slim Amamou =

Tunisian blogger

- سليم عمامو
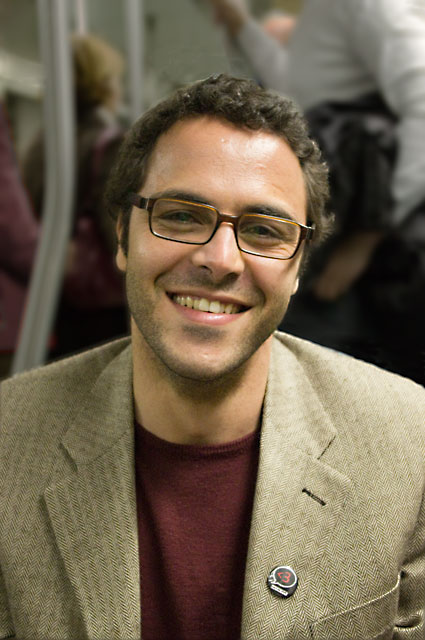

Secretary of State for Sport and Youth
- In office 17 January 2011 – 25 May 2011
- Preceded by: Post created
- Succeeded by: Myriam Mizouni

Personal details
- Born: 1977 (age 48–49)
- Party: Tunisian Pirate Party (2010-2011); Pirate Party of Tunisia
- Education: University of Sousse
- Profession: Programmer
- Website: No Memory Space

Slim Amamou (Arabic: سليم عمامو, romanized: Slīm ‘Amāmū,; born 1977) is a Tunisian blogger and a former Secretary of State for Sport and Youth in the transitional Tunisian government of early 2011. He resigned from the role in the week of 25 May 2011 in protest of the transitional government's censorship of several websites.

== Early life and education ==
Amamou studied at the University of Sousse. He is a blogger and author of ReadWriteWeb France.

== Political career ==
He protested against censorship in Tunisia and organized a demonstration on 22 May 2010.

He was arrested on 6 January 2011 during the protests that led to the Tunisian Revolution, alongside others including Azyz Amami. The Anonymous hacktivist group had led attacks on the Tunisian government's websites, and Amamou was held for five days by the state security forces under the suspicion of having collaborated with the hackers. Following a mass internet campaign and protest, Amamou and other bloggers were released from government custody.

Amamou was later released, and, following the flight of Zine El Abidine Ben Ali, a national unity government was formed. Amamou was invited to become Secretary of State for Sport and Youth (Arabic: كاتب دولة للشباب والرياضة, French: Secrétaire d'État à la Jeunesse et aux Sports) in that government on 17 January 2011. When he assumed the role he told television channel France 2 that he would resign from his role if the government started to interfere with the internet, such as using internet censorship. He received considerable criticism online for joining the transitional government, particularly from fellow bloggers and internet activists.

In his role as Secretary of State for Youth and Sports, he was subordinate to the Minister for Youth and Sports, Mohamed Aloulou. On 29 March 2011, he was expelled from the Tunisian Pirate Party for joining the transitional national unity government. He later joined a rival party, the Pirate Party of Tunisia, instead.

On the week of May 25, he resigned from his post in protest of the transitional government's censorship of several websites at the request of the Tunisian Army.

== Political positions ==
He is an advocate for network neutrality and opposes internet censorship.

He supports the legalization of cannabis in Tunisia.

== See also ==
- 2010–2011 Tunisian revolution
- Operation Tunisia, which gave Amamou software to spread during the revolution
