= Slaheddine Malouche =

Tunisian politician

Slaheddine Malouch is a Tunisian politician. He is the former Minister of Equipment, Housing, and Land Development.

== Biography ==
Slaheddine Malouch was born on June 4, 1956, in Haffouz, Tunisia. He graduated from the Ecole Nationale des Ingénieurs de Tunis in 1981, and received an MPhil in 1986. He also attended the University of Pittsburgh.

IN 1981, he started his career as Director of Equipment and Housing in Kasserine, Jendouba, Monastir and Tunis. In 1995, he became the CEO of Tunisie-Autoroutes. From 2000 to 2008, he was the CEO of the Agence de Réhabilitation et de Rénovation Urbaine.

He has been involved with the Constitutional Democratic Rally from an early age, and has worked on many campaigns.
