= Faouzia Charfi =

Tunisian physicist and politician

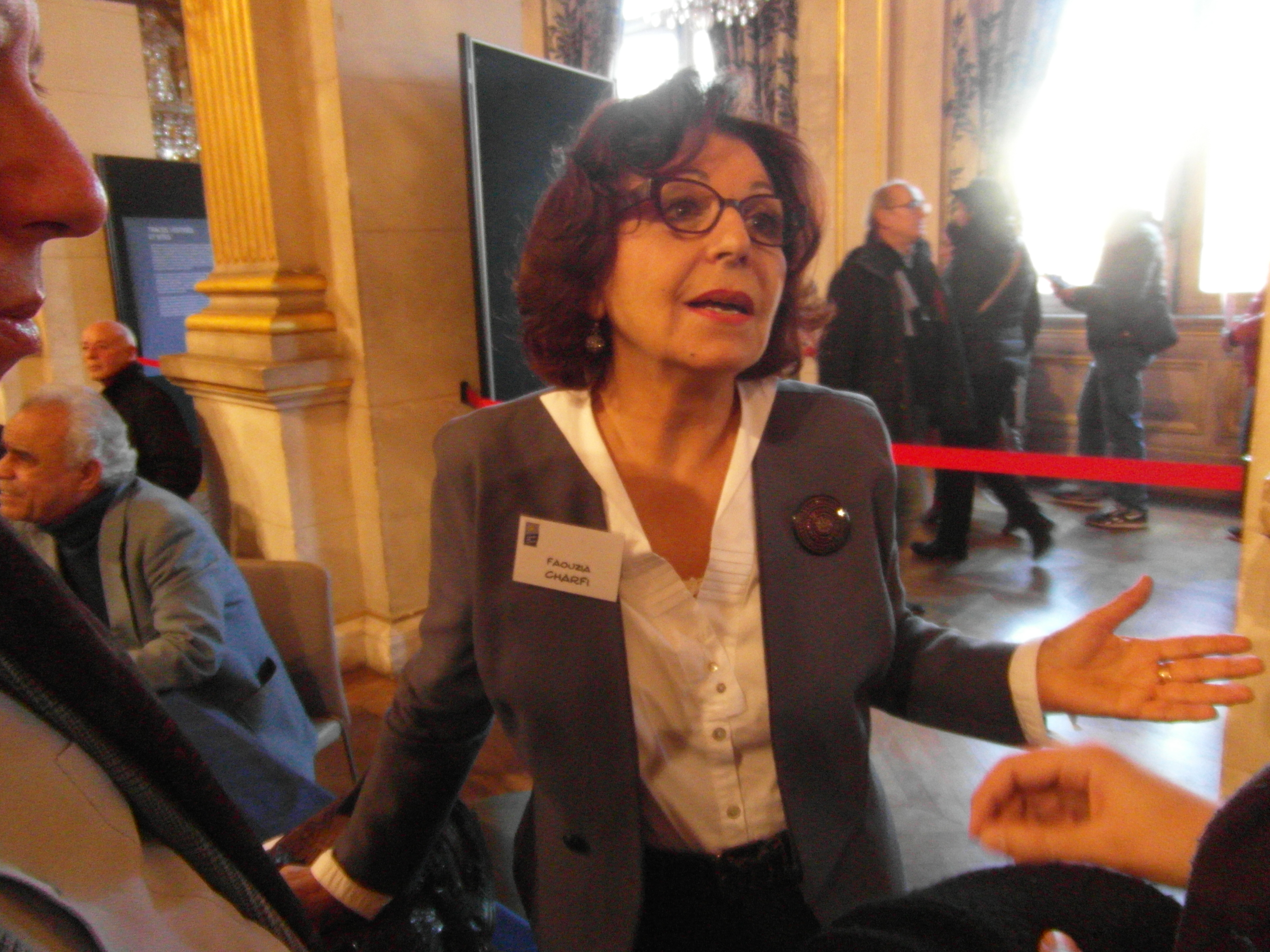
Faouzia Charfi in 2015

Faouzia Farida Charfi (born 1941 in Sfax, née Rekik) is a Tunisian scientist, intellectual and politician. She was Minister of State for Education in 2011.

== Life ==
Charfi graduated from the Sorbonne, Paris, in 1963 in physical sciences, then gained doctorates in 1978 and 1984 from the Faculty of Science of Tunis which is part of Tunis El Manar University. She became the Tunisian Minister of State for Education in 2011.

== Recognition ==
In 1997 she was appointed a Chevalier de la Légion d’Honneur, and in 2001 a Commandeur des Palmes Académiques. In 2019 she was awarded the Chair's medal of the Arab World Institute in recognition of her work against islamic fundamentalism.

== Personal life ==
Charfi's husband was Mohamed Charfi (1936–2008), a Tunisian academic and politician.

== Selected publications ==
- Charfi, Faouzia Farida (2013). La science voilée. Odile Jacob. ISBN 978-2738129895.
- Charfi, Faouzia Farida (2017). Sacrées questions... : Pour un islam d'aujourd'hui. Odile Jacob. ISBN 978-2738134868.
- Charfi, Faouzia Farida (2009). Electromagnétisme, Electrostatique et magnétostatique. Centre de Publication Universitaire, Tunis.
- Charfi, Faouzia (2021). L'islam et la science – en finir avec les compromis. Odile Jacob. ISBN 978-2738156723.
- Charfi, Faouzia (2020). La science en pays d'Islam. Bayard. ISBN 978-2227498235.
