= Mohamed Nouri Jouini =

Tunisian politician

- محمد النوري الجويني
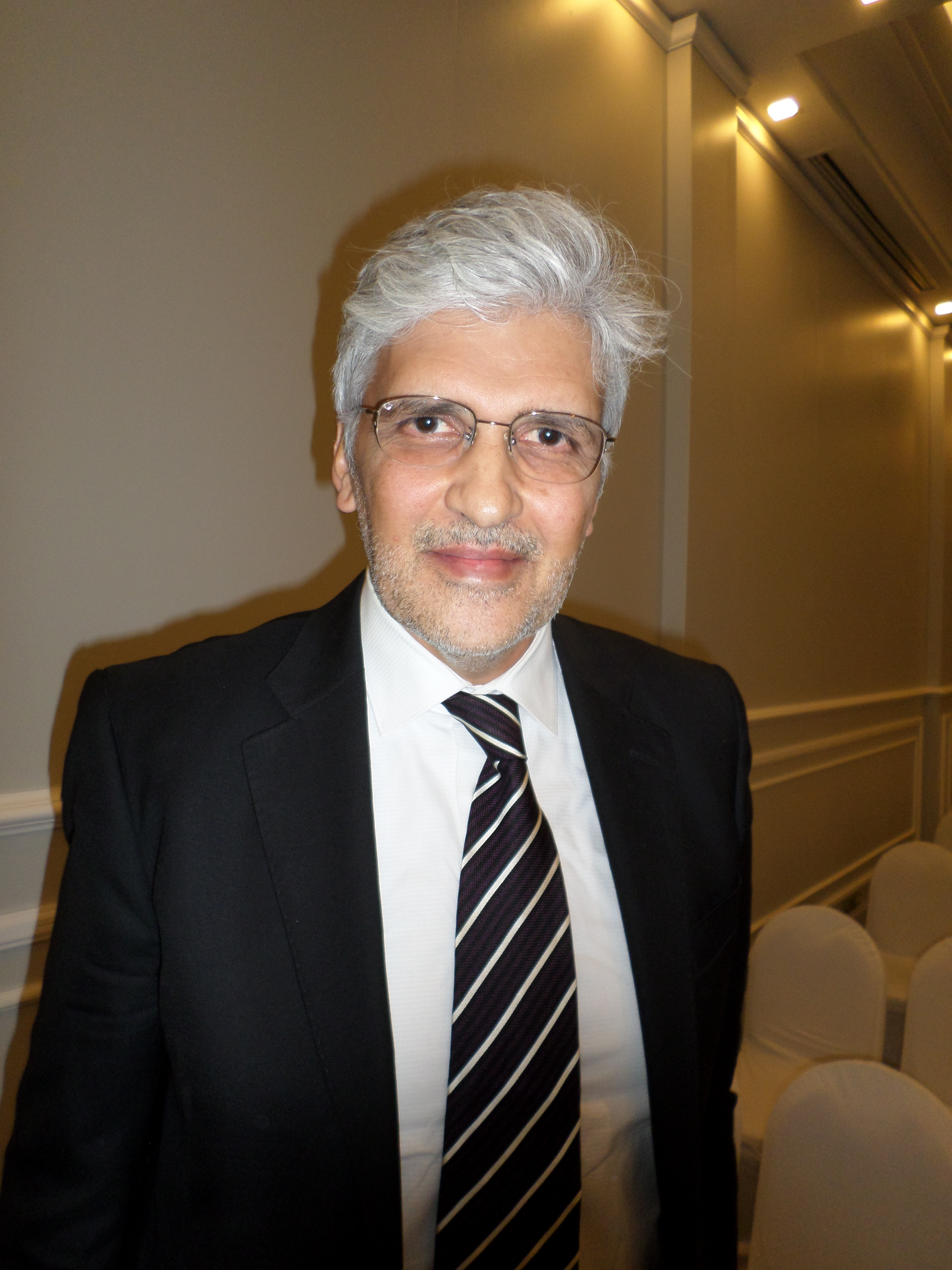
- Mohamed Nouri Jouini, former Tunisian minister

Minister of Planning and International Cooperation
- In office September 2002 – February 2011

Mohamed Nouri Jouini (Arabic: محمد النوري الجويني, born 13 October 1961 in Tunis) is a Tunisian politician.

== Biography ==
He lived in Oregon and returned to Tunisia when former President Zine El Abidine Ben Ali came to power in 1987. He sits on the board of governors of the Arab Bank for Economic Development in Africa.

He received his Ph.D. in Decision Sciences from the University of Oregon and is a former director of the Sousse (Tunisia) Higher Institute of Management. He has also served on the faculty at the University of Tunis.

He is Minister of Planning and International Cooperation between September 2002 and February 2011.

== Honours ==
- 2002 : Officier of the Order of the Republic of Tunisia
- 2009 : Grand Cross of the Order of the Seventh of November (Tunisia)
- 2019 : 2nd Class of the Order of the Rising Sun (Japan)
