= Afif Chelbi =

Tunisian politician

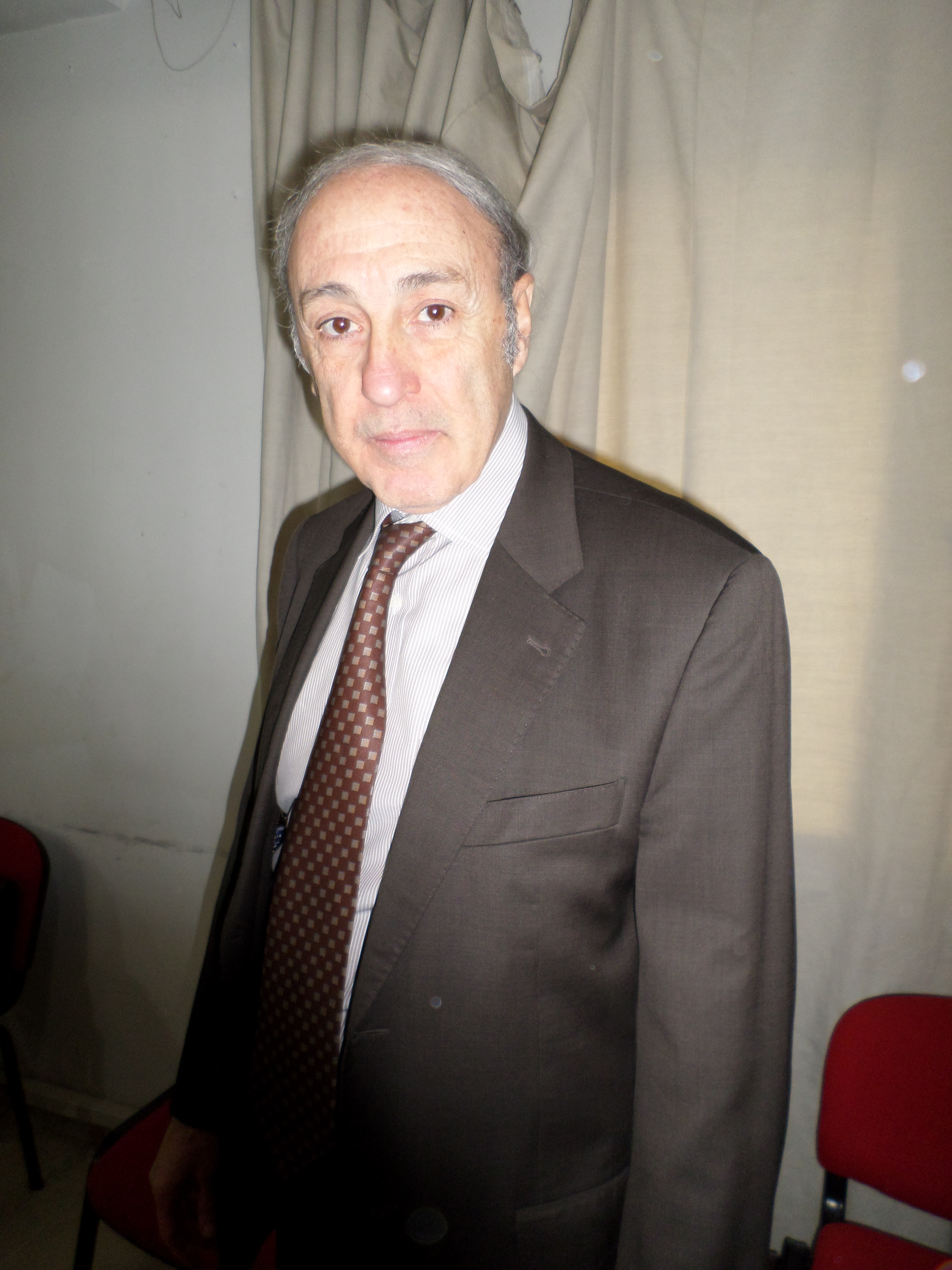
- Chelbi in 2015

Minister of Industry and Technology
- In office 2004–2011

Personal details
- Born: March 14, 1953 (age 73) Tunis, Turkey

Afif Chelbi (born March 14, 1953) is a Tunisian politician. He was the Minister of Industry and Technology from 2004 to 2011.

== Biography ==
Afif Chelbi was born on March 14, 1953, in Tunis. He graduated from the École Centrale Paris in 1978. He worked for the Tunisian Ministry of Economy and for Tunisian Qatari Bank.

Since 2001, he has been the CEO of the International Maghreb Merchant Bank. In 2004, he was appointed as Minister of Industry, Energy and SMEs.
