= Ridha Belhaj (politician) =

Tunisian lawyer and politician

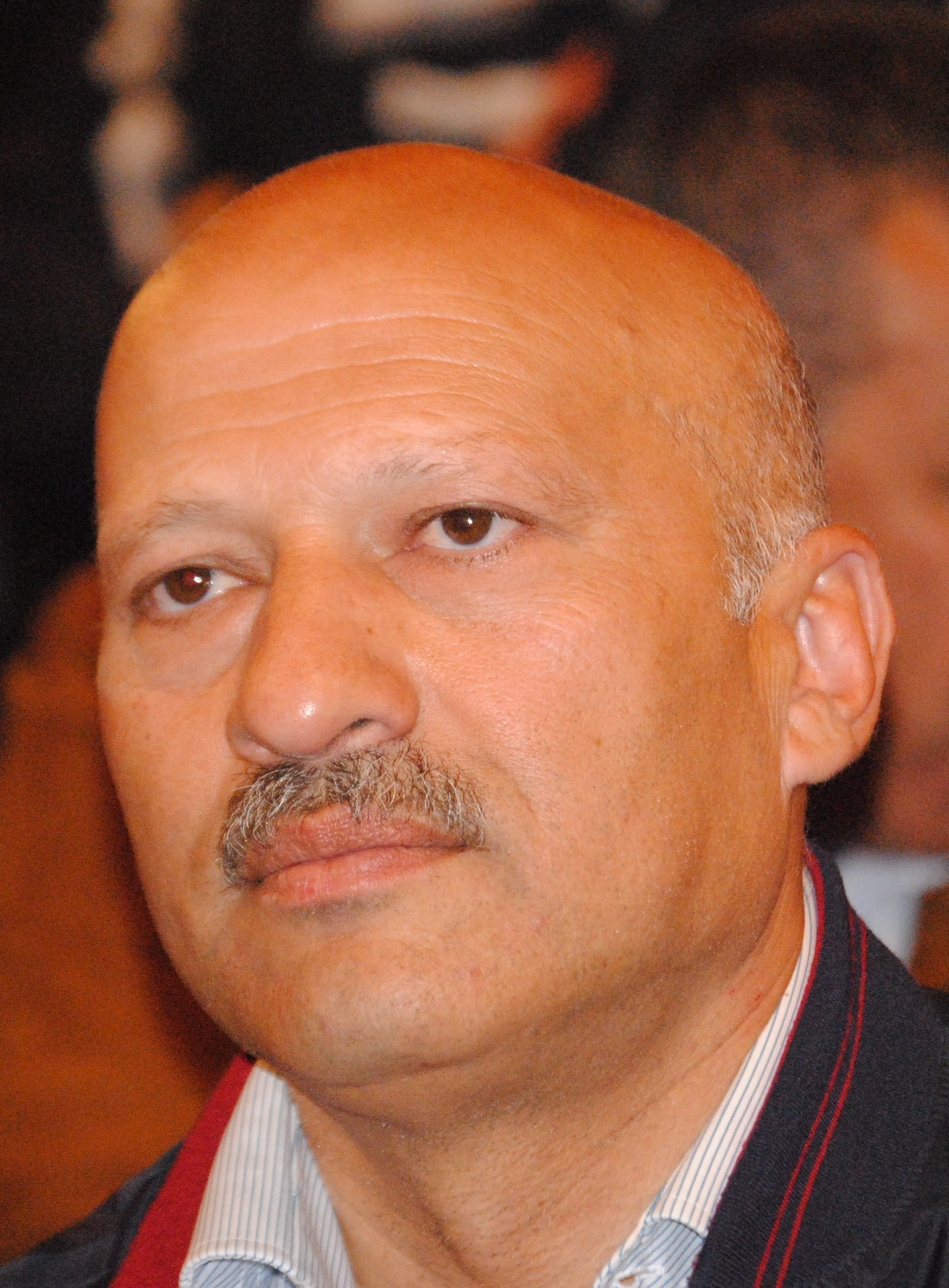

Head of the Presidential Cabinet

Delegate-minister in the Tunisian Transitional Government

Personal details
- Born: 16 February 1962 (age 63); Tunis, Tunisia
- Political party: Nidaa Tounes, Tounes Awalan
- Profession: lawyer

Ridha Belhaj (Arabic: رضا بلحاج), (born 16 February 1962) is a Tunisian lawyer, senior official and politician.

== Biography ==
Ridha Belhaj studied at Alaoui High School in Tunis and then at the Tunisian-Algerian Institute, where he obtained a law degree in 1986 and a diploma in customs and tax economics in 1988.

He was first head of service in the general directorate of participations of the Ministry of Finance. From 2002, he practiced as a lawyer with the Court of cassation.

Having served as the General-secretary and delegate-minister in Beji Caid Essebsi's Transitional Government from February 2011 to December 2011.

On 1 January 2015, the new president of Tunisia Essebsi appointed him the head of his presidential cabinet. On 1 February 2016, Belhaj stepped back to be replaced by Caid Essebsi's cousin Selim Azzabi.

After leaving the government, he joined Nidaa Toune. Member, spokesperson and then vice-president of Nidaa Tounes, he resigned from this party in February 2016 due to political perspective problems. In 2017, he announced the creation of a new party called Tounes Awalan of which he is the chairman of the constitutive committee.

== Honours ==
- Commander of the Order of the Republic of Tunisia (2011)

== Private life ==
Ridha Belhaj is married and has three children.

He is currently in prison.
