= Tunisian revolution =

2010–2011 campaign of civil resistance

- الثورة التونسية (Arabic); Part of the Arab Spring
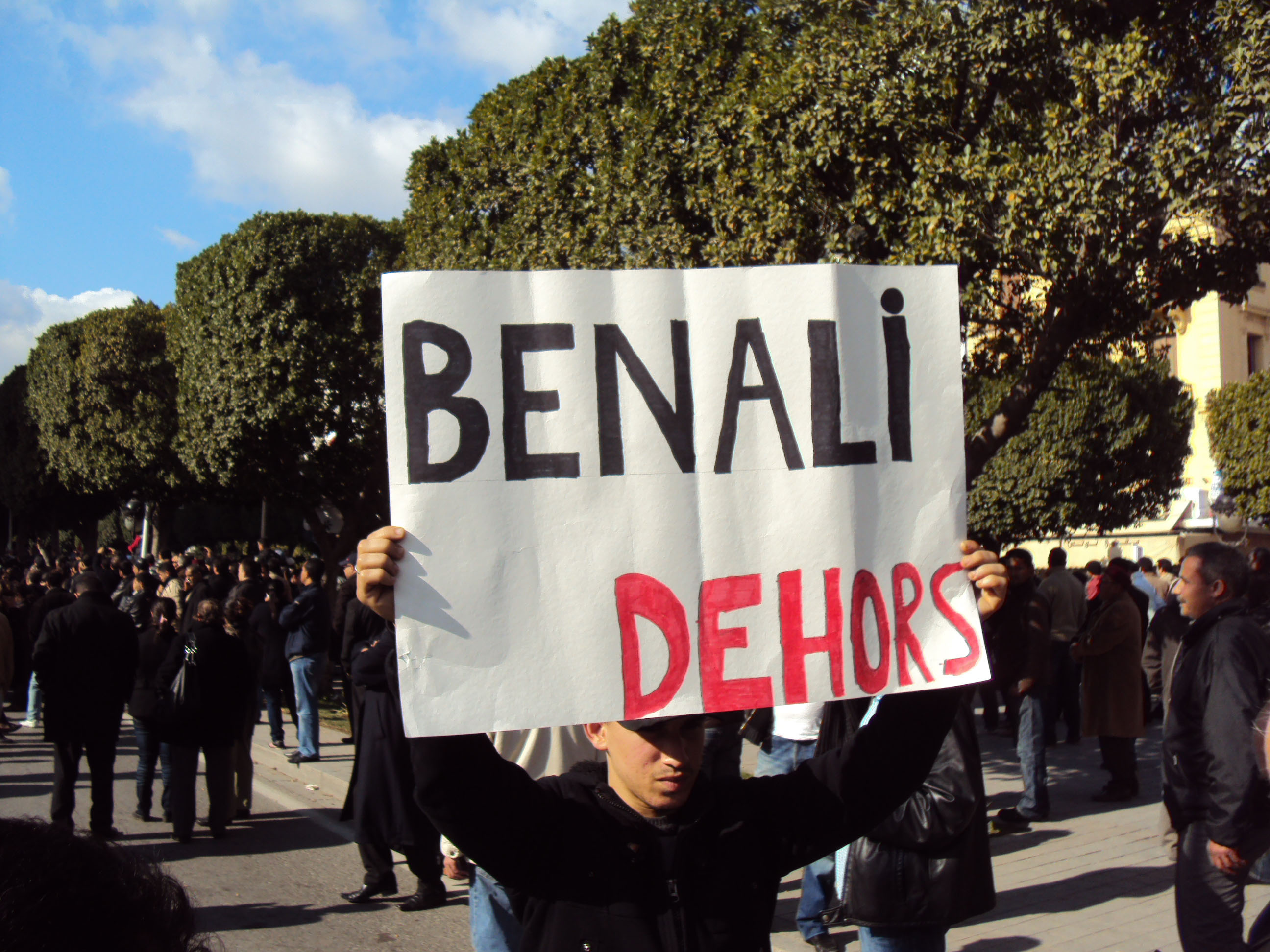
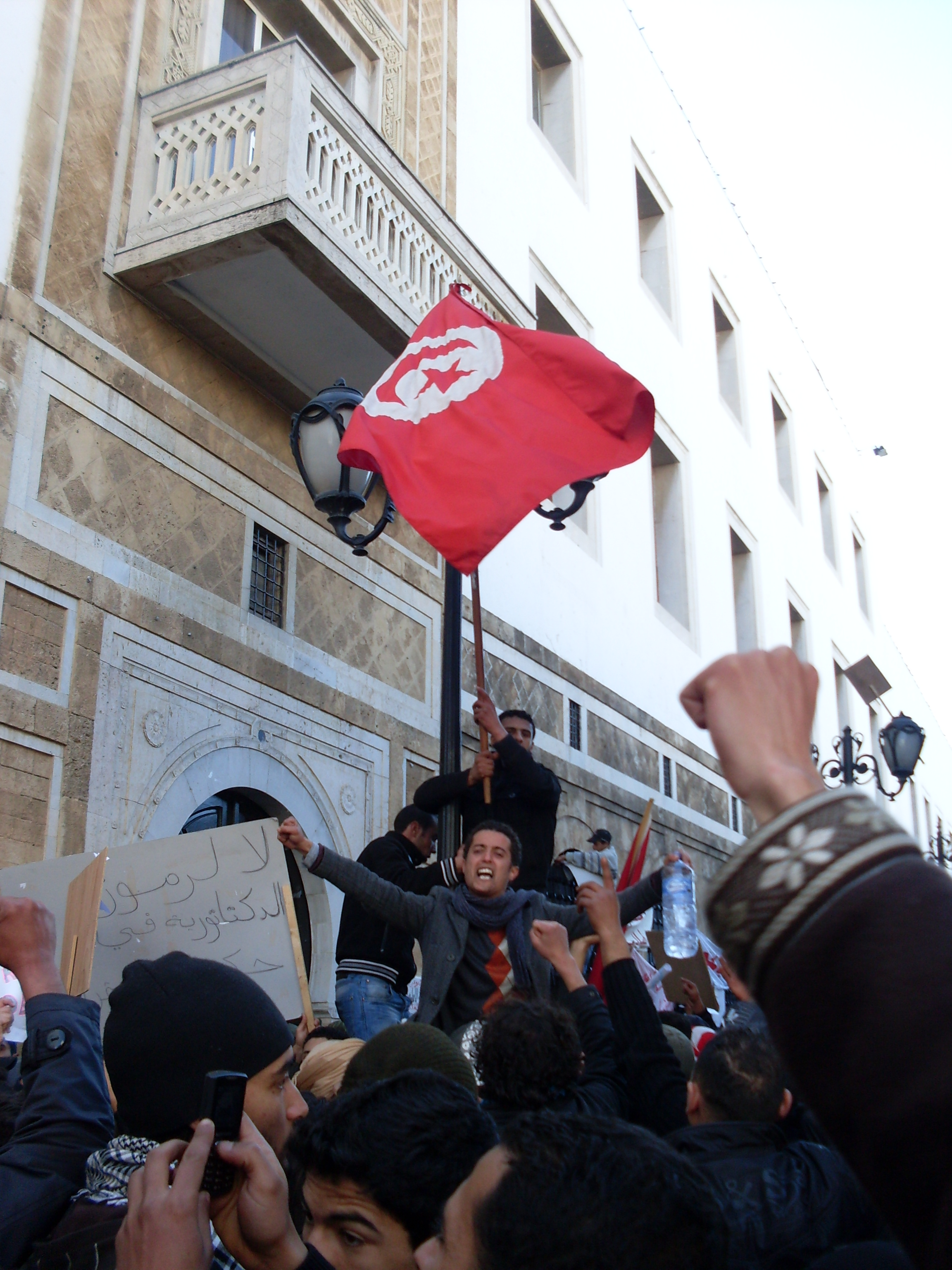
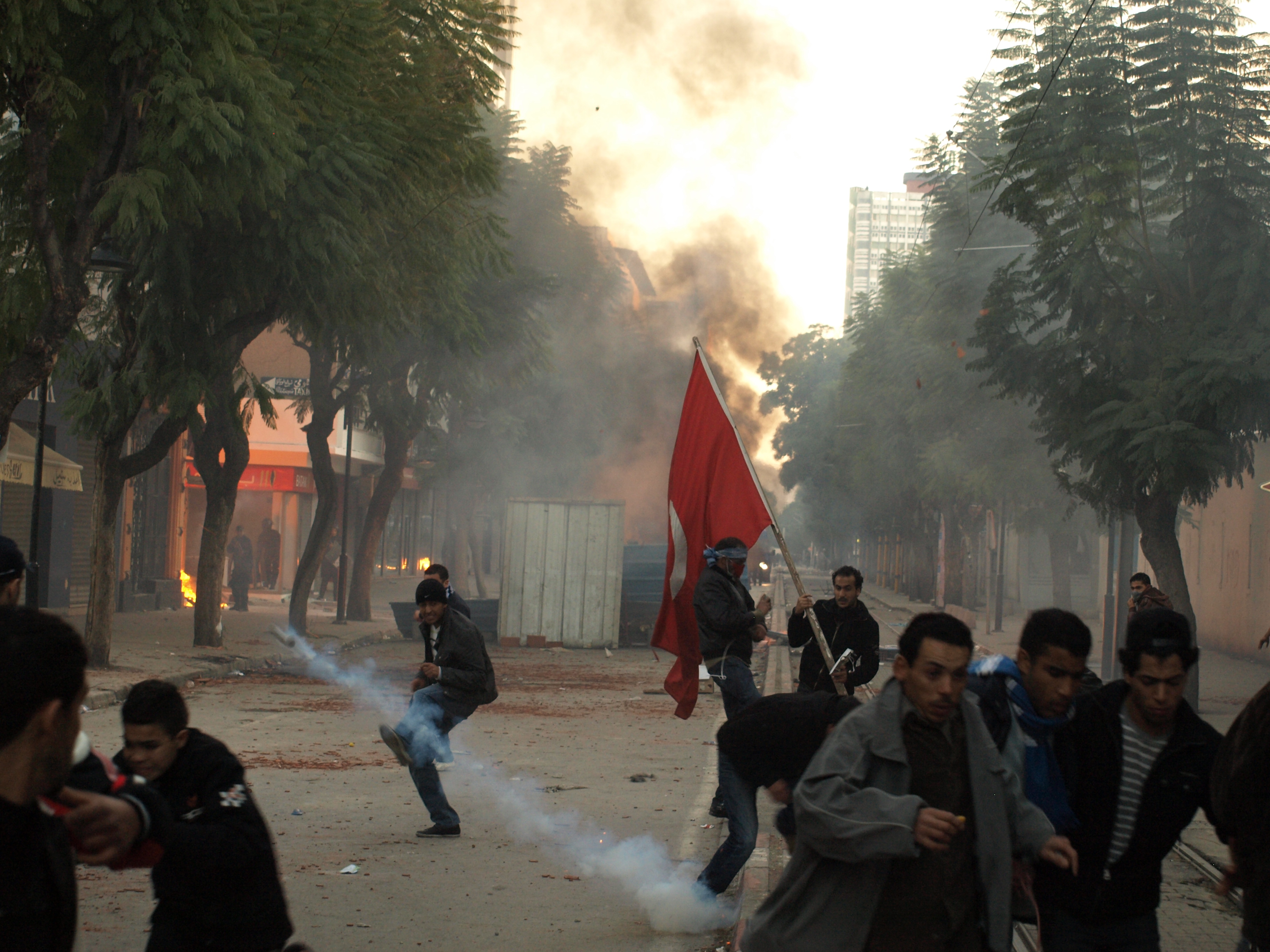
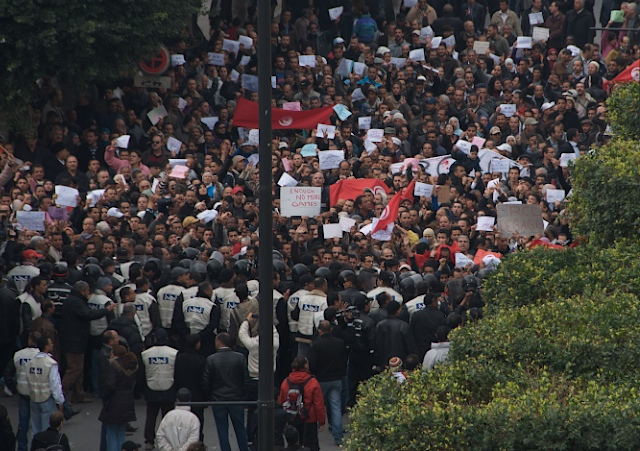
- Date: 17 December 2010 – 14 January 2011 (4 weeks)
- Location: Tunisia
- Caused by: Government corruption; Social inequalities; Unemployment; Political repression; Self-immolation of Mohamed Bouazizi
- Methods: Civil resistance; Demonstrations; General strikes; Self-immolations; Spontaneous uprisings; Online activism
- Result: Overthrow of the Ben Ali government; Resignation of Prime Minister Ghannouchi; Dissolution of the political police; Dissolution of the ruling party; Release of political prisoners; Elections of a Constituent Assembly; Start of the Arab Spring; Subsequent protests against the interim Islamist-led constituent assembly

Casualties
- Deaths: 338
- Injuries: 2,147

The Tunisian revolution (Arabic: الثورة التونسية), also called the Jasmine Revolution and Tunisian Revolution of Dignity, was an intensive 28-day campaign of civil resistance. It included a series of street demonstrations which took place in Tunisia, and led to the ousting of longtime dictator Zine El Abidine Ben Ali in January 2011. It eventually led to a thorough democratization of the country and to free and democratic elections, which had led to it being described as the only successful movement in the Arab Spring.

The demonstrations were caused by high unemployment, food inflation, corruption, a lack of political freedoms (such as freedom of speech), and poor living conditions. The protests constituted the most dramatic wave of social and political unrest in Tunisia in three decades and resulted in scores of deaths and injuries, most of which were the result of action by police and security forces.

The protests were sparked by the self-immolation of Mohamed Bouazizi on 17 December 2010. They led to the ousting of Ben Ali on 14 January 2011, when he officially resigned after fleeing to Saudi Arabia, ending his 23 years in power. Labor unions were an integral part of the protests. The Tunisian National Dialogue Quartet was awarded the 2015 Nobel Peace Prize for "its decisive contribution to the building of a pluralistic democracy in Tunisia in the wake of the Tunisian Revolution of 2011". The protests inspired similar actions throughout the Arab world, in a chain reaction which became known as the Arab Spring movement.

Clashes during the revolution resulted in 338 deaths and 2,174 injuries.

== Naming ==
In Tunisia, and the wider Arab world, the protests and change in government are called the revolution or sometimes called the Sidi Bouzid revolt, the name being derived from Sidi Bouzid, the city where the initial protests began. In the Western media, these events have been dubbed the Jasmine Revolution or Jasmine Spring, after Tunisia's national flower and in keeping with the geopolitical nomenclature of "color revolutions". The name "Jasmine Revolution" originated from American journalist Andy Carvin, but it was not widely adopted in Tunisia itself.

The protests and resultant political crises have generally been called the Jasmine revolution only in the foreign media. Tunisian philosopher Youssef Seddik deemed the term inappropriate because the violence that accompanied the event was "perhaps as deep as Bastille Day", and although the term was coined by the Tunisian journalist Zied El Hani, who first used it on his blog on 13 January and initially spread via social media, it is not in widespread use in Tunisia itself.

The debate surrounding the name and the poetic influences behind the Tunisian revolution was a popular question among Tunisian intellectuals. The name adopted in Tunisia was the Dignity Revolution, which is a translation of the Tunisian Arabic name for the revolution, ثورة الكرامة (Thawrat al-Karāmah). Within Tunisia, Ben Ali's rise to power in 1987 was also known as the Jasmine Revolution.

Because Tunisia's anti-government protests were in part fueled by WikiLeaks revelations, the uprising has been called the first WikiLeaks revolution. The increased reliance on social media as an organizing tool also introduced the label, the Facebook revolution. Le Monde reported how it was common for Tunisian youth to use that term. In a 2012 article in Cyberpsychology, Behavior, and Social Networking, Tunisian and French academics stated that "communication of information has been vital to the success of the Tunisian revolution, and Facebook was its main 'catalyst.'"

== Background ==
President Zine El Abidine Ben Ali had ruled Tunisia since 1987, mostly as a one-party state with the Democratic Constitutional Rally (RCD), following the overthrowing of his predecessor Habib Bourguiba. His government was characterised by the development of Tunisia's private sector in favor of foreign investment, and the repression of political opposition. Foreign media and NGOs criticised his government, which was supported by the United States and France. As a result, the initial reactions to Ben Ali's abuses by the U.S. and France were muted, and most instances of socio-political protest in the country, when they occurred at all, rarely made major news headlines.

Riots in Tunisia were rare and noteworthy, especially since the country is generally considered to be wealthy and stable as compared to other countries in the region. Protests had been repressed and kept silent by the regime, and protesters would be jailed for such actions, as with hundreds of unemployed demonstrators who protested in Gafsa in 2008. As noted by Mohamed Bacha in his book, The Revolutionary Chants of Club Africain Ultras, Tunisian youth had found an outlet to express their anger and dissatisfaction, through the fan chants of sports association Club Africain Ultras, such as: The capital is very angry, We are solidary when we make war to the sons of — Who oppress us, and Hey Regime, The Revolution is Imminent.

At the time of the revolution, Al Jazeera English reported that Tunisian activists are among the most outspoken in its part of the world, with various messages of support being posted on Twitter and Facebook for Bouazizi. An op-ed article in the same network said of the action that it was "suicidal protests of despair by Tunisia's youth." It pointed out that the state-controlled National Solidarity Fund and the National Employment Fund had traditionally subsidized many goods and services in the country but had started to shift the "burden of providence from state to society" to be funded by the bidonvilles, or shanty towns, around the richer towns and suburbs. It also cited the "marginalisation of the agrarian and arid central, northern west and southern areas [that] continue[s] unabated." The protests were also called an "uprising" because of "a lethal combination of poverty, unemployment, and political repression: three characteristics of most Arab societies." It was a revolution, notes a Tunisian geographer, "started not by the middle class or the northern urban centers, but by marginalised social groups."

== Mohamed Bouazizi and Sidi Bouzid ==
Twenty-six-year-old Mohamed Bouazizi had been the sole income earner in his extended family of eight. He operated a vegetable or apple cart (the contents of the cart are disputed) for seven years in Sidi Bouzid, 300 kilometres (190 miles) south of Tunis. On 17 December 2010, a female officer confiscated his cart and produce. Bouazizi, who had such an event happen to him before, tried to pay the 10-dinars fine (a day's wages, equivalent to US$3). It was initially reported that in response, the policewoman insulted his deceased father and slapped him. Although many of the details were incorrect, the story was "disseminated and used to mobilize as much as possible against the Ben Ali regime," according to sociologist Habib Ayeb. The officer, Fedia Hamdi, stated that she was not even a policewoman, but a city employee who had been tasked that morning with confiscating produce from vendors without licenses. When she tried to do so with Bouazizi, a scuffle ensued. She said in a subsequent interview that she never slapped him.

A humiliated Bouazizi then went to the provincial headquarters in an attempt to complain to local municipality officials and to have his produce returned. He was refused an audience. Without alerting his family, at 11:30 am and within an hour of the initial confrontation, Bouazizi returned to the headquarters, doused himself with a flammable liquid and set himself on fire. Public outrage quickly grew over the incident, leading to protests. This immolation, and the heavy-handed response by the police to peaceful marchers, provoked riots the next day in Sidi Bouzid. The riots went largely unnoticed, though social media sites disseminated images of police dispersing youths who attacked shop windows and damaged cars. Bouazizi was subsequently transferred to a hospital near Tunis. In an attempt to quell the unrest, President Ben Ali visited Bouazizi in the hospital on 28 December. Bouazizi died on 4 January 2011.

Sociologist Asef Bayat, who visited Tunisia after the uprising and carried out field research, wrote about the mechanisation of large-scale capitalist farms in towns like Sidi Bouzid that have come "at the cost of smallholders' debt, dispossession, and proletarianization." Tunisian geographer-cinematographer Habib Ayeb, founder of the Tunisian Observatory for Food Sovereignty and the Environment (OSAE), has questioned the model of development that was introduced in Sidi Bouzid:

[The region] received the most investment between 1990 and 2011. The leading region. It is a region that had an extensive semi-pastoral farming system, and it became in less than 30 years the premier agricultural region of the country. At the same time Sidi Bouzid had been a "moderately poor" region, in a sense, and I put that in quotation marks, and it is now the fourth-poorest region in the country. This is the development which people desire... The problem is that the local population does not benefit. These are people from Sfax and the Sahel who get rich in Sidi Bouzid, not the people of Sidi Bouzid. Hence the link with the story of Mohamed Bouazizi.

== Protests ==
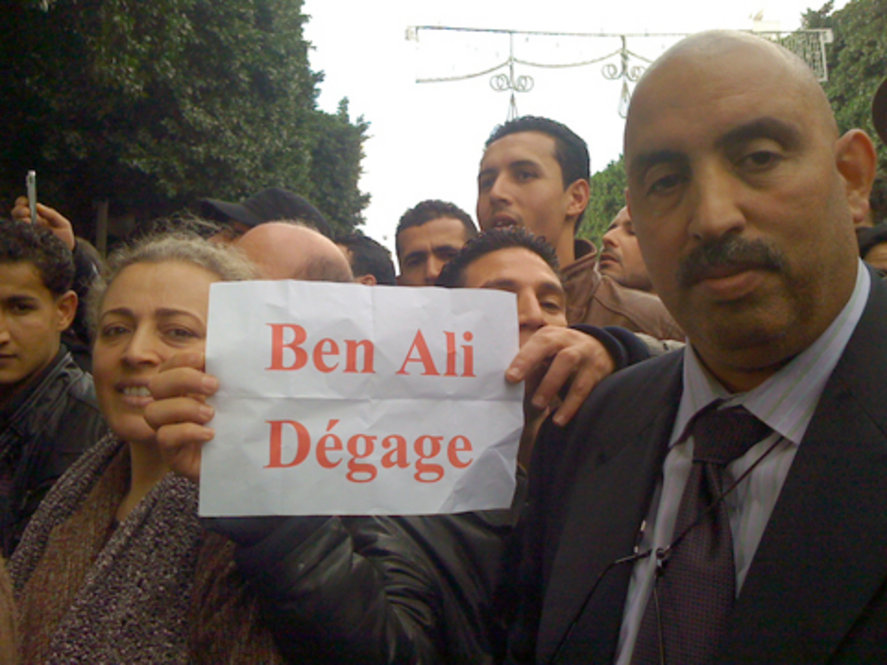
Protesters with a sign that says "Ben Ali, get lost" in French

On 28 November 2010, WikiLeaks and five major newspapers (Spain's El País, France's Le Monde, Germany's Der Spiegel, the United Kingdom's The Guardian, and the United States' The New York Times) simultaneously published the first 220 of 251,287 leaked documents labeled confidential. These included descriptions of corruption and repression by the Tunisian regime. It is widely believed that the information in the WikiLeaks documents contributed to the protests, which began a few weeks later.

There were reports of police obstructing demonstrators and using tear gas on hundreds of young protesters in Sidi Bouzid in mid-December. The protesters had gathered outside regional government headquarters to demonstrate against the treatment of Mohamed Bouazizi. Coverage of events was limited by Tunisian media. On 19 December, extra police were present on the city's streets.

On 22 December, protester Lahseen Naji, responding to "hunger and joblessness", electrocuted himself after climbing an electricity pylon. Ramzi Al-Abboudi also killed himself because of financial difficulties arising from a business debt by the country's micro-credit solidarity programme. On 24 December, Mohamed Ammari was fatally shot in the chest by police in Bouziane. Other protesters were also injured, including Chawki Belhoussine El Hadri, who died later on 30 December. Police claimed they shot the demonstrators in "self-defence". A "quasi-curfew" was then imposed on the city by police. Rapper El Général, whose songs had been adopted by protesters, was arrested on 24 December but released several days later after "an enormous public reaction".

Violence increased, and protests reached the capital, Tunis, on 27 December where a thousand citizens expressed solidarity with residents of Sidi Bouzid and called for jobs. The rally, organised by independent trade union activists, was stopped by security forces. Protests also spread to Sousse, Sfax and Meknassy. The following day, the Tunisian Federation of Labour Unions held another rally in Gafsa which was also blocked by security forces. About 300 lawyers held a rally near the government's palace in Tunis. Protests continued again on 29 December.

On 30 December, police peacefully dispersed a protest in Monastir, while using force to disrupt further demonstrations in Sbikha and Chebba. Momentum appeared to continue with the protests on 31 December and the Tunisian National Lawyers Order organised further demonstrations and public gatherings by lawyers in Tunis and other cities. Mokhtar Trifi, president of the Tunisian Human Rights League (LTDH), said that lawyers across Tunisia had been "savagely beaten". There were also unconfirmed reports of another man attempting to commit suicide in El Hamma.

On 3 January 2011, protests in Thala over unemployment and a high cost of living turned violent. At a demonstration of 250 people, mostly students, police fired tear gas; one canister landed in a local mosque. In response, the protesters were reported to have set fire to tires and attacked the RCD offices. Some of the more general protests sought changes in the government's online censorship; Tunisian authorities allegedly carried out phishing operations to take control of user passwords and check online criticism. Both state and non-state websites had been hacked.

On 6 January, 95% of Tunisia's 8,000 lawyers went on strike, according to the chairman of the national bar association. He said, "The strike carries a clear message that we do not accept unjustified attacks on lawyers. We want to strongly protest against the beating of lawyers in the past few days." It was reported on the following day that teachers had also joined the strike.

In response to 11 January protests, police used riot gear to disperse protesters ransacking buildings, burning tyres, setting fire to a bus and burning two cars in the Tunis working-class suburb of Ettadhamen-Mnihla. The protesters were said to have chanted "We are not afraid, we are not afraid, we are afraid only of God". Military personnel were also deployed in many cities around the country.

On 12 January, a reporter from Italian broadcaster RAI stated that he and his cameraman were beaten with batons by police during a riot in Tunis's central district and that the officers then confiscated their camera. A curfew was ordered in Tunis after protests and clashes with police.

Hizb ut-Tahrir organised protests after Friday prayer on 14 January to call for re-establishing the Islamic caliphate. A day later, it also organised other protests that marched to the 9 April Prison to free political prisoners.

Also on 14 January, Lucas Dolega, a photojournalist for the European Pressphoto Agency, was hit in the forehead by a tear gas canister fired by the police at short range; he died two days later.

== End of Ben Ali's rule ==
During a national television broadcast on 28 December, President Ben Ali criticised protesters as "extremist mercenaries" and warned of "firm" punishment. He also accused "certain foreign television channels" of spreading falsehoods and deforming the truth, and called them "hostile to Tunisia". His remarks were ignored and the protests continued.

On 29 December, Ben Ali shuffled his cabinet to remove communications minister Oussama Romdhani, while also announcing changes to the trade and handicrafts, religious affairs, communication and youth portfolios. The next day he also announced the dismissal of the governors of Sidi Bouzid, Jendouba and Zaghouan.

In January 2011, Ben Ali said 300,000 new jobs would be created, though he did not clarify what that meant. He described the protests as "the work of masked gangs" attacking public property and citizens in their homes, and "a terrorist act that cannot be overlooked". Ahmed Najib Chebbi, the leader of the Progressive Democratic Party (PDP), responded that despite official claims of police firing in self-defense "the demonstrations were non-violent and the youths were claiming their rights to jobs" and that "the funeral processions [for those killed on 9 January] turned into demonstrations, and the police fired [at] the youths who were at these [...] processions." He then criticised Ben Ali's comments as the protesters were "claiming their civil rights, and there is no terrorist act...no religious slogans". He further accused Ben Ali of "looking for scapegoats" and dismissed the creation of jobs as empty promises.

Several webloggers and rapper El Général were arrested, but the rapper and some of the bloggers were later released. Reporters Without Borders said the arrest of at least six bloggers and activists, who had either been arrested or had disappeared across Tunisia, was brought to their attention and that there were "probably" others. Tunisian Pirate Party activists Slah Eddine Kchouk, Slim Amamou (later appointed Secretary of State for Sport and Youth by the incoming government) and Azyz Amamy were arrested but later released. Hamma Hammami, the leader of the banned Tunisian Workers' Communist Party and a prominent critic of Ben Ali, was arrested on 12 January, and released two days later.

On 10 January, the government announced the indefinite closure of all schools and universities in order to quell the unrest. Days before departing office, Ben Ali announced that he would not change the present constitution, which would require him to step down in 2014 due to his age.

On 14 January, Ben Ali dissolved his government and declared a state of emergency. The official reason given was to protect Tunisians and their property. People were barred from gathering in groups of more than three, and could be arrested or shot if they tried to run away. Ben Ali called for an election within six months to defuse demonstrations aimed at forcing him out. France24 reported that the military took control of the airport and closed the country's airspace.

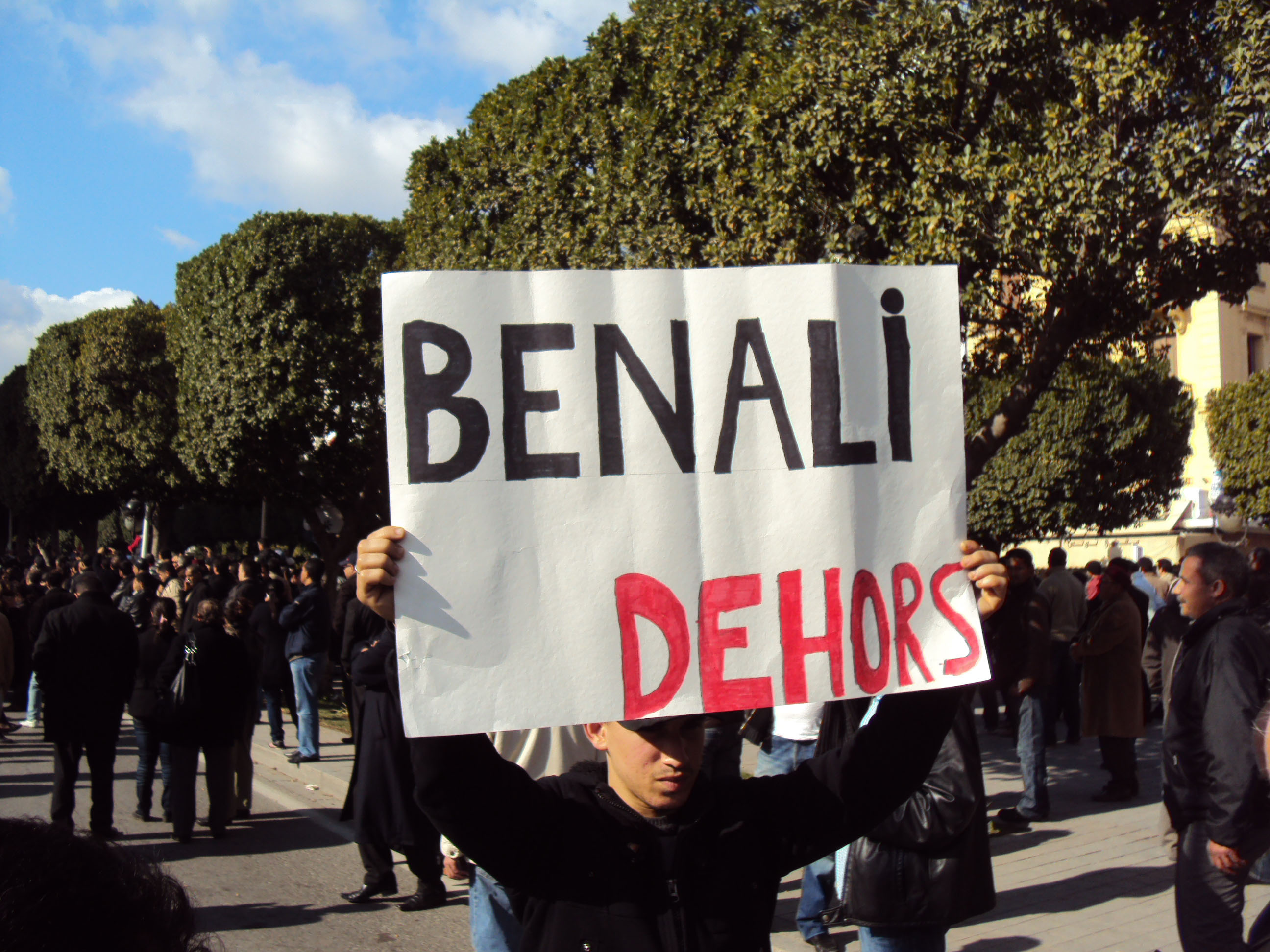
Translation from French: Ben Ali out

On the same day, Ben Ali fled the country for Malta under Libyan protection. His aircraft landed in Jeddah, Saudi Arabia, after France rejected a request to land on its territory. Saudi Arabia cited "exceptional circumstances" for their heavily criticised decision to give him asylum, saying it was also "in support of the security and stability of their country". Saudi Arabia demanded Ben Ali remain "out of politics" as a condition for accepting him.

== Initial impact of Ben Ali's overthrow ==
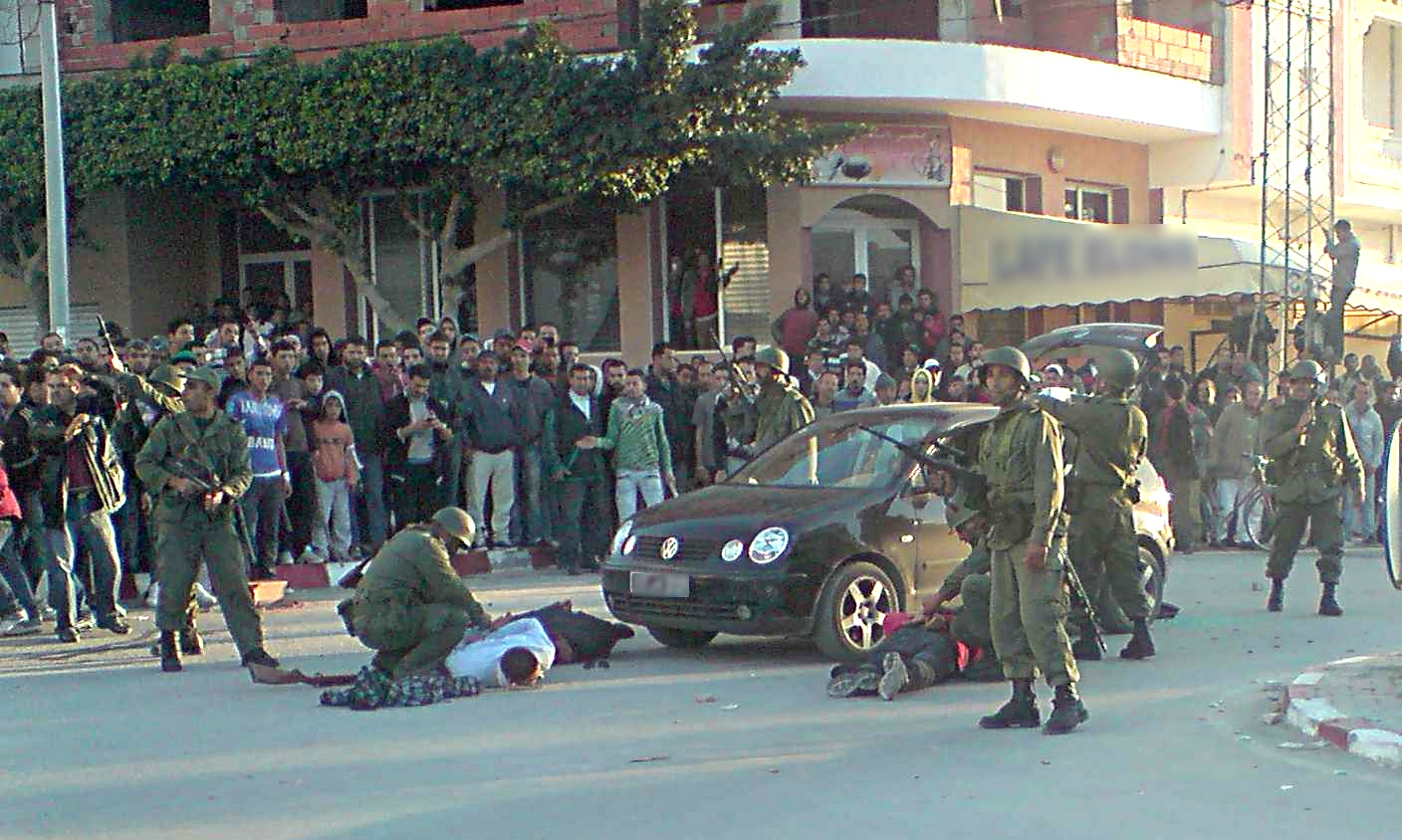
Tunisian soldiers serving as gendarmes

Following Ben Ali's departure from the country, a state of emergency was declared. Army Commander Rachid Ammar pledged to "protect the revolution". Prime Minister Mohamed Ghannouchi then briefly took over as acting president. On the morning of 15 January, Tunisian state TV announced that Ben Ali had officially resigned his position and Ghannouchi had handed over the presidency to parliamentary speaker Fouad Mebazaa, with Ghannouchi returning to his previous position as prime minister. This was done after the head of Tunisia's Constitutional Council, Fethi Abdennadher, declared that Ghannouchi did not have right to power, and confirmed Fouad Mebazaa as acting president under Article 57 of the constitution. Mebazaa was given 60 days to organise new elections. Mebazaa said it was in the country's best interest to form a national unity government.

INTERPOL confirmed that its National Central Bureau (NCB) in Tunis had issued a global alert to find and arrest Ben Ali and six of his relatives.

A commission to reform the constitution and law in general was set up under Yadh Ben Achour. There were also calls by the opposition to delay the elections, holding them in six or seven months with international supervision.

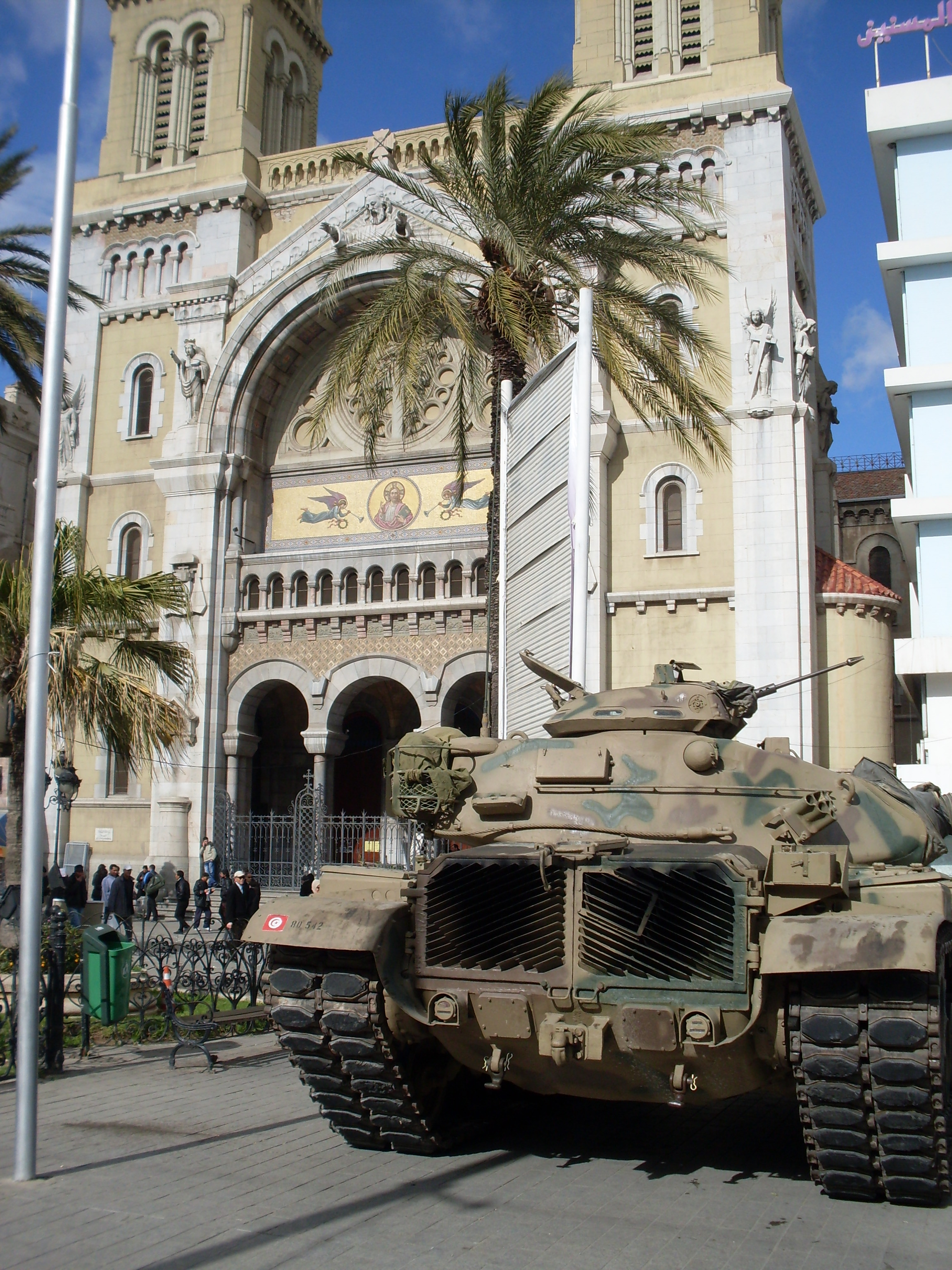
A Tunisian army tank deployed in front of the Cathedral of St. Vincent de Paul in Tunis

Following Ben Ali's departure, violence and looting continued and the capital's main train station was torched. The national army was reported to be extensively deployed in Tunisia, including elements loyal to Ben Ali.

A prison director in Mahdia freed about 1,000 inmates following a prison rebellion that left 5 people dead. Many other prisons also had jailbreaks or raids from external groups to force prisoner releases, some suspected to be aided by prison guards. Residents who were running out of necessary food supplies had armed themselves and barricaded their homes, and in some cases had formed armed neighborhood watches. Al Jazeera's correspondent said there were apparently three different armed groups: the police (numbering 250,000), security forces from the Interior Ministry, and irregular militias supportive of Ben Ali who were vying for control.

Ali Seriati, head of presidential security, was arrested and accused of threatening state security by fomenting violence. Following this, gun battles took place near the Presidential Palace between the Tunisian army and elements of security organs loyal to the former regime. The Tunisian army was reportedly struggling to assert control. Gunfire continued in Tunis and Carthage as security services struggled to maintain law and order.

The most immediate result of the protests was seen in increased Internet freedoms. While commentators were divided about the extent to which the Internet contributed to the ousting of Ben Ali, Facebook remained accessible to roughly 20% of the population throughout the crisis whilst its passwords were hacked by a country-wide man-in-the-middle attack. YouTube and DailyMotion became available after Ben Ali's ouster, and the Tor anonymity network reported a surge of traffic from Tunisia.

=== Displays of support ===
In France, where a large Tunisian diaspora resides, displays of support were organized in several cities, including Paris Toulouse, Lyon, Nantes, Marseille, Nice, Bordeaux, and Strasbourg.

== Ghannouchi government ==
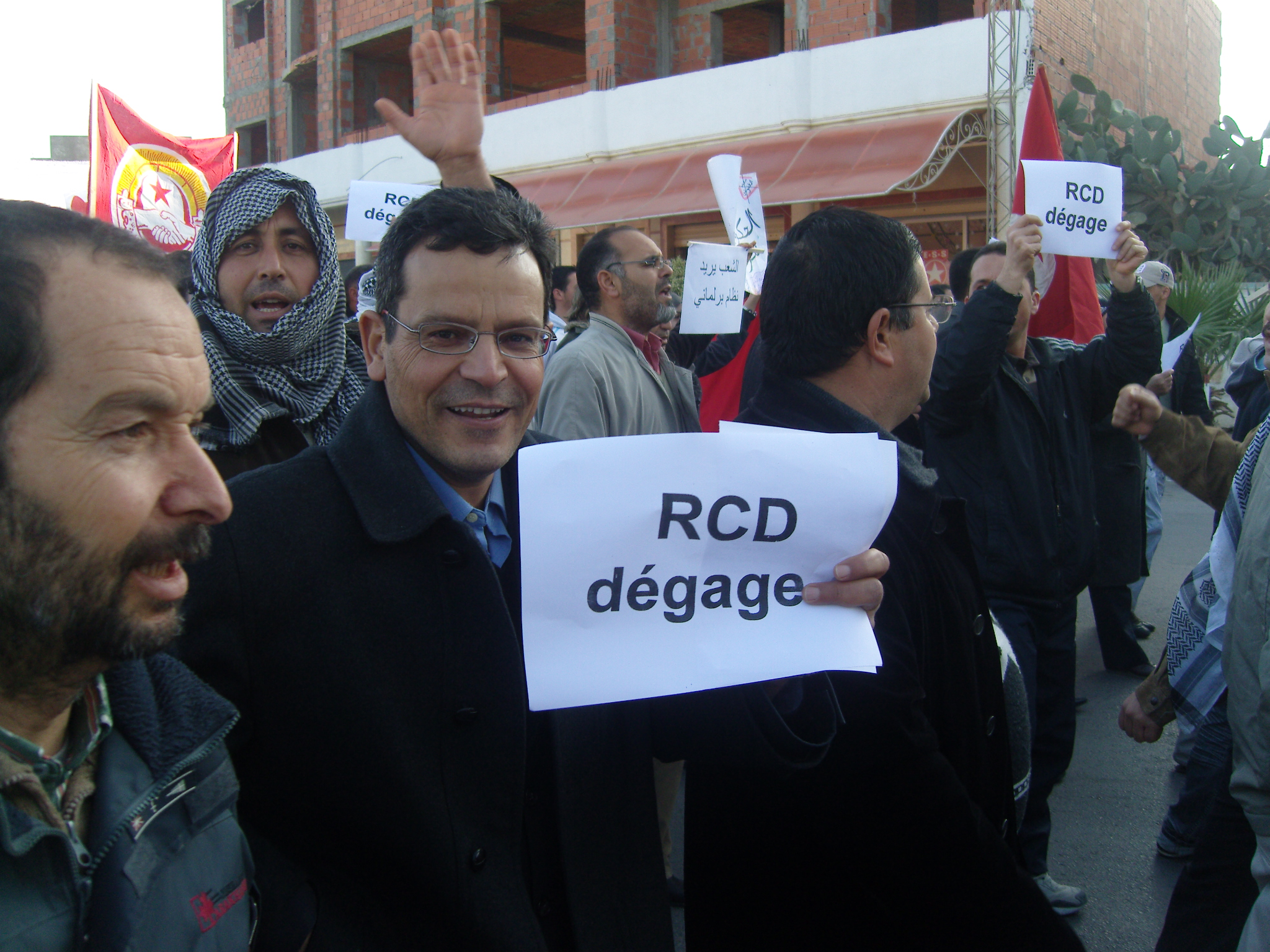
A protest by the General Labour Union

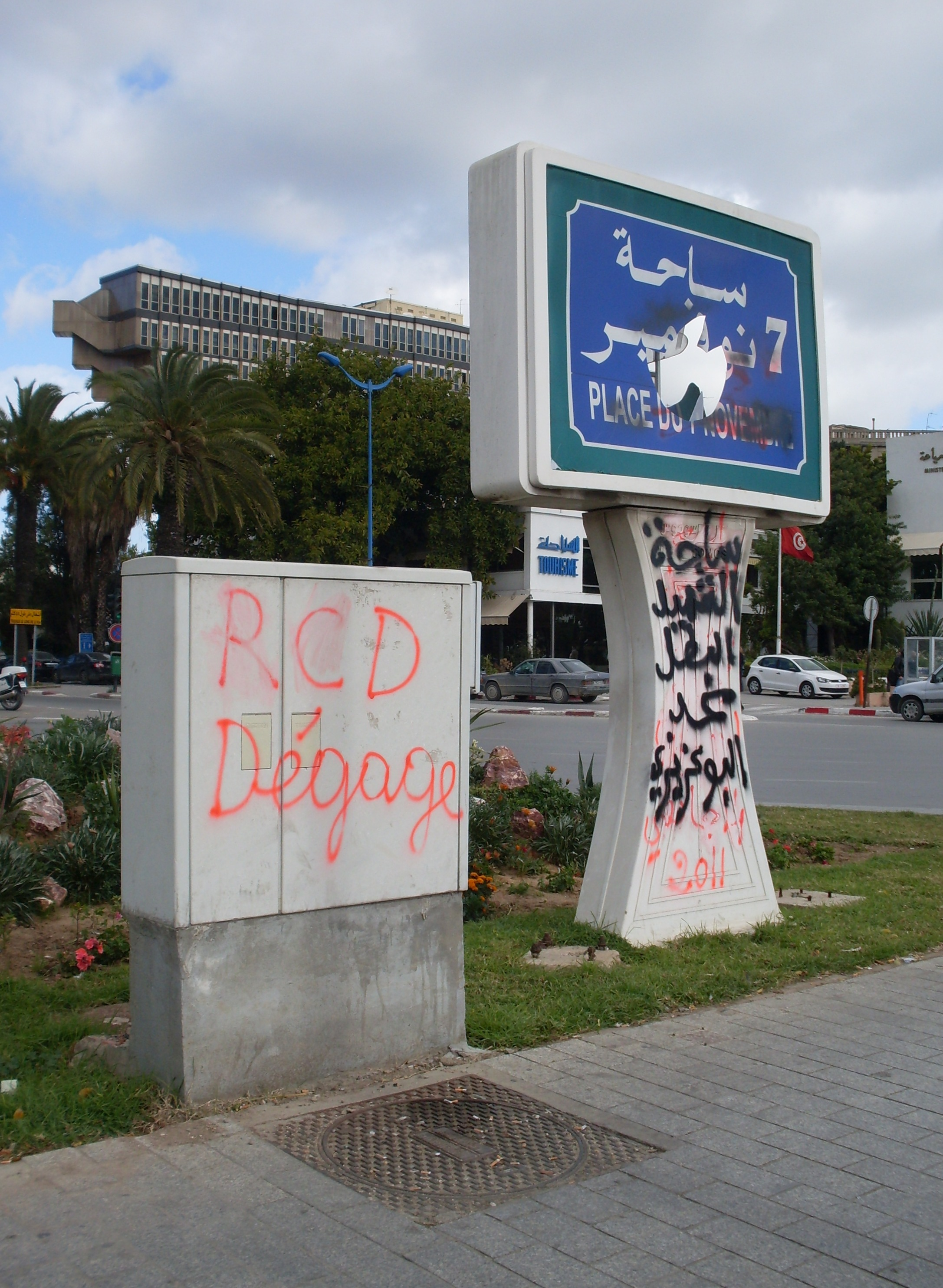
Anti-RCD graffiti and vandalism

The Ghannouchi administration (15 January – 27 February 2011) was a caretaker government with the primary goal of maintaining the state and providing a legal framework for new elections.

Prime Minister Mohamed Ghannouchi announced his cabinet on 17 January 2011, three days after Ben Ali's departure. The cabinet included twelve members of the ruling RCD, the leaders of three opposition parties (Mustapha Ben Jafar from the Democratic Forum for Labour and Liberties [FTDL], Ahmed Brahim of the Ettajdid Movement, and Ahmed Najib Chebbi of the PDP), three representatives from the Tunisian General Labour Union (UGTT), and representatives of civil society (including prominent blogger Slim Amamou). Three notable movements not included in the national unity government were the banned Ennahda Movement, the Tunisian Workers' Communist Party and the secular reformist Congress for the Republic. The following day, the three members of the UGTT and Ben Jafaar resigned, saying that they had "no confidence" in a government featuring members of the RCD.

There were daily protests that members of Ben Ali's RCD party were in the new government. Thousands of anti-RCD protesters rallied in a protests with relatively little violence. On 18 January, demonstrations were held in Tunis, Sfax, Gabes, Bizerta, Sousse and Monastir. Ghannouchi and interim president Mebazaa resigned their RCD memberships in a bid to calm protests, and Ghannouchi stated that all members of the national unity government had "clean hands".

On 20 January, Zouhair M'Dhaffer, a close confidant of Ben Ali, resigned from the government. All other RCD ministers resigned from the party and the central committee of the RCD disbanded itself. The new government announced in its first sitting that all political prisoners would be freed and all banned parties would be legalised. The next day, Ghannouchi committed to resigning after holding transparent and free elections within six months.

Police began to join the protests in Tunis on 23 January over salaries, and to deflect blame over political deaths attributed to them during Ben Ali's rule. Army chief Rachid Ammar declares that the armed forces are also on the side of the protesters and would "defend the revolution".

On 27 January, Ghannounchi reshuffled his cabinet, with six former-RCD members departing the interim government. Only Ghannouchi and the ministers of industry and international cooperation (who had not been RCD members) remained from Ben Ali's old government. This was seen as meeting one of the protesters' demands, and the UGTT stated its support for the reorganised cabinet. New ministers included state attorney Farhat Rajhi as interior minister, retired career diplomat Ahmed Ounaies as foreign minister, and economist Elyes Jouini as minister delegate to the prime minister in charge of administrative and economic reform. Ounaies later resigned after praising a foreign politician with ties to Ben Ali. Mouldi Kefi became the new foreign minister on 21 February.

By 3 February, all 24 regional governors had been replaced. Days later, the government reached an agreement with the UGTT on the nomination of new governors. The Interior Ministry replaced 34 top-level security officials who were a part of Ben Ali's security infrastructure. Mebazaa promised a national dialogue to address protester demands.

Sidi Bouzid and El Kef saw violence in early February with protesters killed and a police car set on fire. A local police chief was arrested. On 7 February, the defense ministry called up soldiers discharged in the previous five years to help control unrest.

The first steps were taken on a bill that would give Mebazaa emergency powers, allowing him to bypass the RCD-dominated parliament. The bill would allow Mebazaa to ratify international human-rights treaties without parliament; he had previously stated that Tunisia would accede to the International Convention for the Protection of All Persons from Enforced Disappearance, the Rome Statute of the International Criminal Court, the Optional Protocol to the Convention against Torture and other Cruel, Inhuman or Degrading Treatment or Punishment, and the First and Second Optional Protocol to the International Covenant on Civil and Political Rights (which would mean abolishing the death penalty).

Reports emerged on 18 February that Ben Ali had had a stroke and was gravely ill. Plans for a general amnesty were also announced on that day.

Protests flared on 19 February, with 40,000 protesters demanding a new interim government completely free of association with the old regime, and a parliamentary system of government replacing the current presidential one. As a date was announced for an election in mid-July 2011, more than 100,000 protesters demanded the removal of Ghannouchi. On 27 February, following a day of clashes in which five protesters were killed, Ghannouchi resigned. He stated that he had carried his responsibilities since Ben Ali fled, and "I am not ready to be the person who takes decisions that would end up causing casualties. This resignation will serve Tunisia, and the revolution and the future of Tunisia."

== Caïd Essebsi government ==
Béji Caïd Essebsi became prime minister, appointed by Mebazaa on the day Ghannouchi resigned. Although the cabinet was now free of RCD members, demonstrations continued as the protesters criticized the unilateral appointment of Essebsi without consultation.

Ghannouchi's resignation was followed the next day by the resignations of industry minister Afif Chelbi and international co-operation minister Mohamed Nouri Jouini. There were now protests for the entire interim government to resign, with the UGTT calling for an elected constituent assembly to write a new constitution. Further resignations were reported on 1 March: minister for higher education and scientific research Ahmed Brahim, minister of local development Ahmed Nejib Chebbi, and minister of economic reform Elyes Jouini.

Mebazaa announced elections to a Constituent Assembly would be held on 24 July 2011. This would likely postpone general elections to a later date. This fulfilled a central demand of protesters.

In early March, the interim government announced that the secret police would be dissolved. A Tunis court announced the dissolution of the RCD and liquidation of its assets, though the party said it would appeal the decision.

In mid-April, charges were announced against Ben Ali, for whom international arrest warrants were issued in January. There were 18 charges, including voluntary manslaughter and drug trafficking. His family and former ministers faced 26 further charges.

The elections were further postponed and ultimately held on 23 October 2011. The election appointed members to a Constituent Assembly charged with rewriting Tunisia's Constitution. The formerly banned Islamic party Ennahda, which was legalised in March, won with 41% of the total vote.

== Effects ==
=== Refugees ===
In mid-February 2011, about 4,000 mostly Tunisian refugees landed on the Italian island of Lampedusa, causing the authorities to declare a state of emergency that would allow for federal aid to the island. Italian Interior Minister Roberto Maroni accused the EU of not doing enough to curb immigration and asked them to do more. He said that the "Tunisian system was collapsing" and that he would "ask the Tunisian Foreign Ministry for permission for our authorities to intervene to stop the flow in Tunisia", suggesting Italian troops would be on Tunisian soil. He called the event a "biblical exodus". The comments started a row between the two countries with the Tunisian Foreign Ministry saying it was ready to work with Italy and others but that it "categorically rejects any interference in its internal affairs or any infringement of its sovereignty." In response, Italy's Foreign Minister Franco Frattini said that both countries share a "common interest" to halt the immigration, while he also offered "logistical help in terms of police and equipment" and called to re-establish previously successful coastal patrols of Northern Africa. By 14 February, at least 2,000 refugees had been sent to Sicily with the other 2,000 quarantined at a re-opened holding center. On 2 March about 350 more people arrived on the island. In response, Italy declared a humanitarian emergency.

The International Organization for Migration said that no new boats had been spotted. The EU's Catherine Ashton was on a visit to Tunisia to discuss the issue. German Chancellor Angela Merkel said that "not everyone who does not want to be in Tunisia can come to Europe. Rather, we need to talk to each other how we can strengthen the rule of law in Tunisia again and whether Europe can be of help."

=== Stock market ===
The national stock market, the Bourse de Tunis (TUNINDEX), fell on 12 January for a three consecutive day loss of 9.3%. Following the curfew in Tunis, the market index again fell 3.8% as the cost of protecting against a sovereign default in credit default swaps rose to its highest level in almost two years.

Following the resignations of Ghanoucchi and two Ben Ali-era ministers, the bourse was again suspended.

=== International and non-state ===
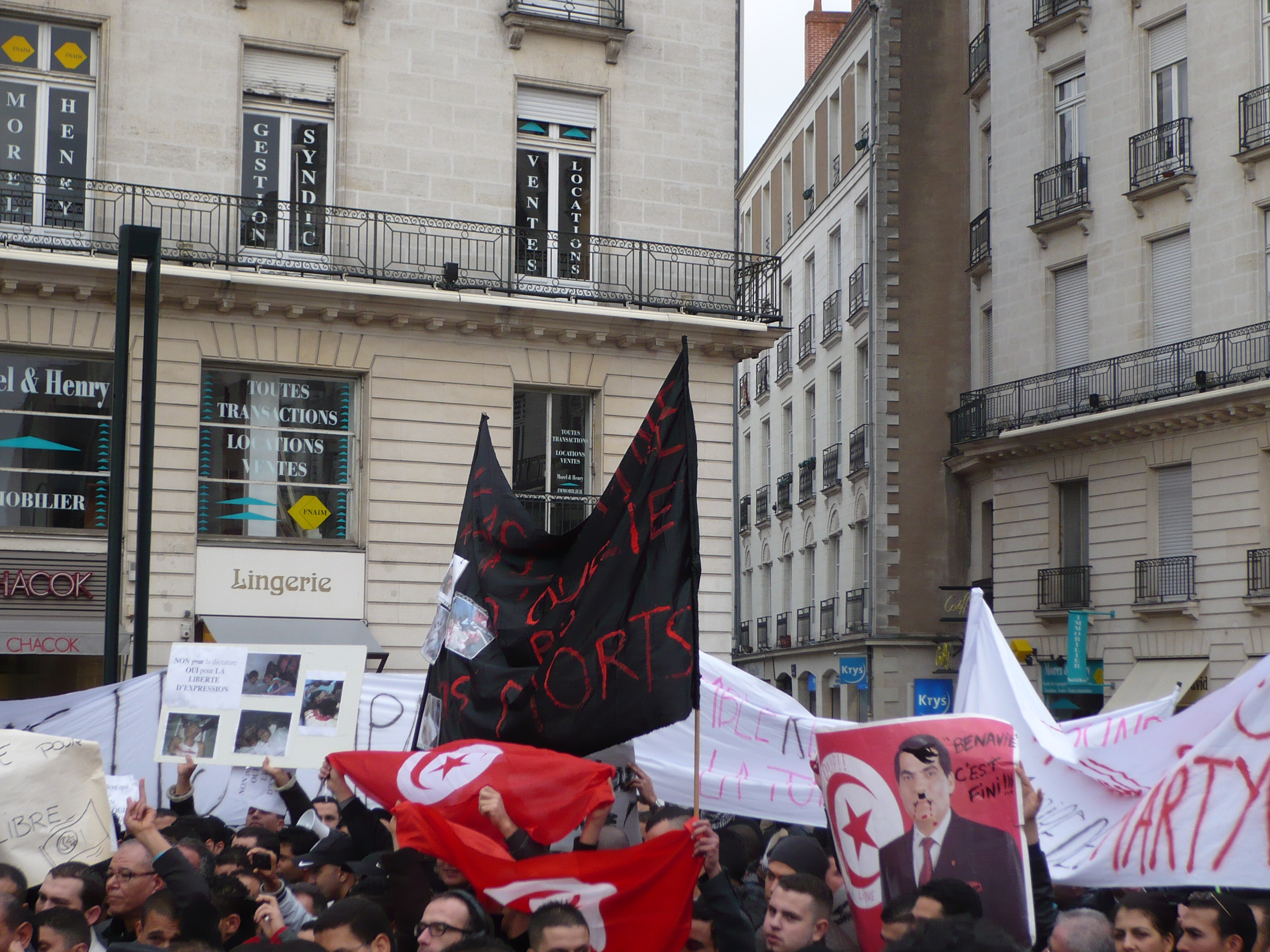
Nantes, France, demonstration in support of the Tunisian protests

Many governments and supranational organisations expressed concerns over use of force against protesters. France, the former colonial power of Tunisia, was one of just a few states that expressed strong support for the Ben Ali government prior to its ouster, though protests were held in solidarity with Tunisia in several French cities, with the French Socialist Party voicing support for the popular revolution.

=== Media and punditry ===
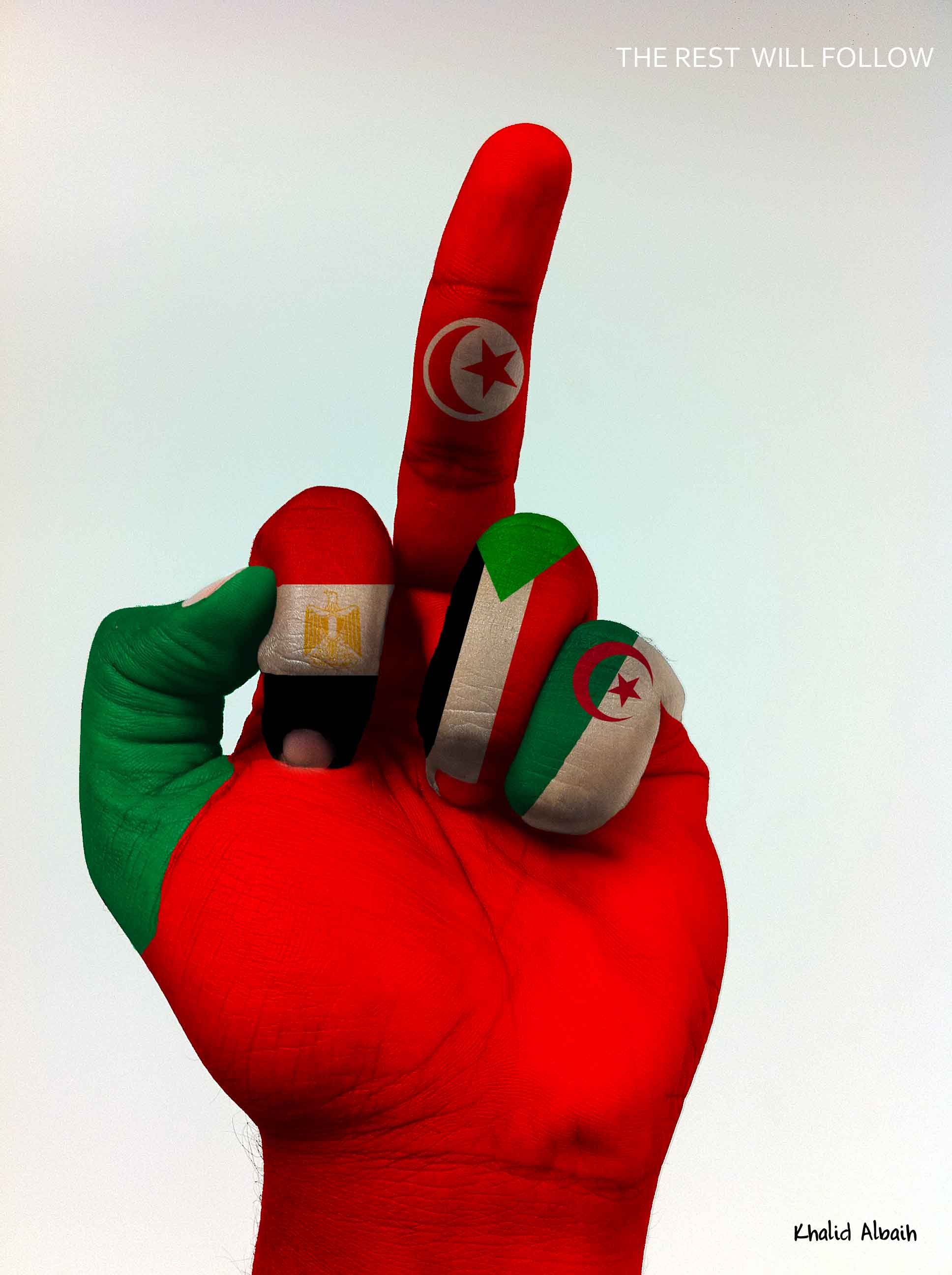
"The rest will follow". Symbolic middle finger gesture representing the Tunisian Revolution and its influences in the Arab world. From left to right, the fingers are painted as flags of Muammar Gaddafi's Libya, Egypt, Tunisia, Sudan and Algeria.

The lack of coverage in the domestic state-controlled media was criticised. Writer/activist Jillian York alleged that the mainstream media, particularly in the Western world, was providing less coverage and less sympathetic coverage to the Tunisia protests relative to Iranian protests, the Green movement, and censorship in China. York alleged the "US government – which intervened heavily in Iran, approving circumvention technology for export and famously asking Twitter to halt updates during a critical time period – has not made any public overtures toward Tunisia at this time."

Despite criticism about the "sparse" level of coverage and "little interest" given to the demonstrations by the international media, the protests were hailed by some commentators as "momentous events" in Tunisian history. Brian Whitaker, writing in The Guardian on 28 December 2010, suggested that the protests would be enough to bring an end to Ben Ali's presidency and noted similarities with the protests that led to the end of Nicolae Ceauşescu's reign in Romania in 1989. Steven Cook, writing for the Council of Foreign Relations, noted that a tipping point is only obvious after the fact, and pointed to the counter-example of the 2009–2010 Iranian election protests. Ben Ali's governing strategy was nevertheless regarded as being in serious trouble, and Elliott Abrams noted both that demonstrators were able for the first time to defy the security forces and that the regime had no obvious successors to Ben Ali and his family. French management of the crisis came under severe criticism, with notable silence in the mainstream media in the run-up to the crisis.

== Repercussion analysis ==
Al Jazeera believed the ousting of the president meant the "glass ceiling of fear has been shattered forever in Tunisia and that the police state that Ben Ali created in 1987 when he came to power in a coup seems to be disintegrating". It added that Ben Ali's resignation, following his statement that he had been "duped by his entourage", may not have been entirely sincere. Le Monde criticised French President Nicolas Sarkozy and the European Union's "Silence over the Tragedy" when the unrest broke. The Christian Science Monitor suggested that mobile telecommunications played an influential role in the "revolution".

The revolt in Tunisia began speculation that the Tunisian Jasmine Revolution would lead to protests against the multiple other autocratic regimes across the Arab world. This was most famously captured in the phrase asking whether "Tunisia is the Arab Gdańsk?". The allusion refers to the Polish Solidarity movement and the role of Gdańsk as the birthplace of the movement that ousted Communism in Eastern Europe. The phrase appeared in outlets such as the BBC, as well as editorials by columnists Rami Khouri and Roger Cohen.

Larbi Sadiki suggested that although "conventional wisdom has it that 'terror' in the Arab world is monopolised by al-Qaeda in its various incarnations", there was also the fact that "regimes in countries like Tunisia and Algeria have been arming and training security apparatuses to fight Osama bin Laden [but] were [still] caught unawares by the 'bin Laden within': the terror of marginalisation for the millions of educated youth who make up a large portion of the region's population. The winds of uncertainty blowing in the Arab west – the Maghreb – threaten to blow eastwards towards the Levant as the marginalised issue the fatalistic scream of despair to be given freedom and bread or death." A similar opinion by Lamis Ardoni carried by Al Jazeera said that the protests had "brought down the walls of fear, erected by repression and marginalization, thus restoring the Arab peoples' faith in their ability to demand social justice and end tyranny." He also said that the protests that succeeded in toppling the leadership should serve as a "warning to all leaders, whether supported by international or regional powers, that they are no longer immune to popular outcries of fury" even though Tunisia's ostensible change "could still be contained or confiscated by the country's ruling elite, which is desperately clinging to power." He called the protests the "Tunisian intifada" which had "placed the Arab world at a crossroads". He further added that if the change was ultimately successful in Tunisia it could "push the door wide open to freedom in Arab world. If it suffers a setback we shall witness unprecedented repression by rulers struggling to maintain their absolute grip on power. Either way, a system that combined a starkly unequal distribution of wealth with the denial of freedoms has collapsed."

Similarly, Mark LeVine noted that the events in Tunisia could spiral into the rest of the Arab world as the movement was "inspiring people...to take to the streets and warn their own sclerotic and autocratic leaders that they could soon face a similar fate." He then cited solidarity protests in Egypt where protesters chanted "Kefaya" and "We are next, we are next, Ben Ali tell Mubarak he is next;" and that Arab bloggers were supporting the movement in Tunisia as "the African revolution commencing...the global anti-capitalist revolution." He concluded that there were two scenarios that could play out: "a greater democratic opening across the Arab world," or a similar situation to Algeria in the early 1990s when the democratic election was annulled and Algeria went into a civil war.

Robert Fisk asked if this was "The end of the age of dictators in the Arab world?" and partly answered the question in saying that Arab leaders would be "shaking in their boots". He also pointed out that the "despot" Ben Ali sought refuge in the same place as the ousted Idi Amin of Uganda and that "the French and the Germans and the Brits, dare we mention this, always praised the dictator for being a 'friend' of civilized Europe, keeping a firm hand on all those Islamists." He notably pointed at the "demographic explosion of youth" of the Maghreb, though he said that the change brought about in Tunisia may not last. He thinks "this is going to be the same old story. Yes, we would like a democracy in Tunisia – but not too much democracy. Remember how we wanted Algeria to have a democracy back in the early Nineties? Then when it looked like the Islamists might win the second round of voting, we supported its military-backed government in suspending elections and crushing the Islamists and initiating a civil war in which 150,000 died. No, in the Arab world, we want law and order and stability."

Blake Hounshell wrote on Foreignpolicy.com that the Tunisian precedent raised the prospect of a "new trend. There is something horrifying and, in a way, moving about these suicide attempts. It's a shocking, desperate tactic that instantly attracts attention, revulsion, but also sympathy."

=== Impact of the Internet ===
The use of communication technologies, and the Internet in particular, has been widely credited as a contributor to the mobilization of protests. A blog associated with Wired described the intricate efforts of the Tunisian authorities to control such online media as Twitter and Facebook. Other regional regimes were also on higher alert to contain spillover effects that might have ensued.

On 11 March 2011, Reporters Without Borders gave its annual award for online media freedom to the Tunisian blogging group Nawaat.org. Founded in 2004, it played an important role for rallying anti-government protesters by reporting on the protests which the national media ignored.

== Regional instability ==
In January 2011, the BBC reported: "Clearly the self-immolation of Mohamed Bouazizi has resonated across the region...'There is great interest. The Egyptian people and the Egyptian public have been following the events in Tunisia with so much joy, since they can draw parallels between the Tunisian situation and their own.'"

After the beginning of the uprising in Tunisia, a similar revolution in Egypt led to the removal of president Hosni Mubarak on 11 February, in turn triggering a wider series of protests across the Arab world. Major demonstrations against longtime Libyan leader Muammar Gaddafi broke out on 17 February and quickly deteriorated into civil war, ultimately resulting in the downfall of the Gaddafi regime later in the year. In Syria, an uprising demanding the removal of President Bashar al-Assad also deteriorated into a civil war, and partly causing the current refugee crisis. In addition, Yemen, Bahrain, and Algeria also saw major protests.

However, a financial analyst in Dubai suggested that "the spillover effect of the political turbulence to the large countries in the Gulf Cooperation Council is non-existent as there are no similar drivers."

== Aftermath ==
In mid-May 2013, Tunisia banned the Salafi Jihadist Ansar al-Sharia organization from carrying out party congresses. The day after the congress was due to be carried out, clashes between security forces and party supporters in Kairouan resulted in one death amid attempts to disperse those who wanted to carry out the events.

The Tunisian president, Beji Caïd Essebsi, renewed the state of emergency in October 2015 for three months due to previous terror attacks. In August 2019, the United States aided Tunisia with $335 million that will be given in five years to support its democratic transition and help in funding projects and initiatives that would develop the country.

The European Commission is refusing to release the results of a human rights inquiry in Tunisia, raising questions about transparency in relation to a migration deal, amid reports of mistreatment of migrants.

== See also ==
- 2008 Tunisian protests
- 2011–2012 Tunisian protests
- Art and politics in post-2011 Tunisia
- List of conflicts in Africa
- List of modern conflicts in North Africa
- Operation Tunisia
- Self-immolations in Tunisia
