= Mohamed Ghannouchi =

Tunisian politician (born 1941)

- محمد الغنوشي
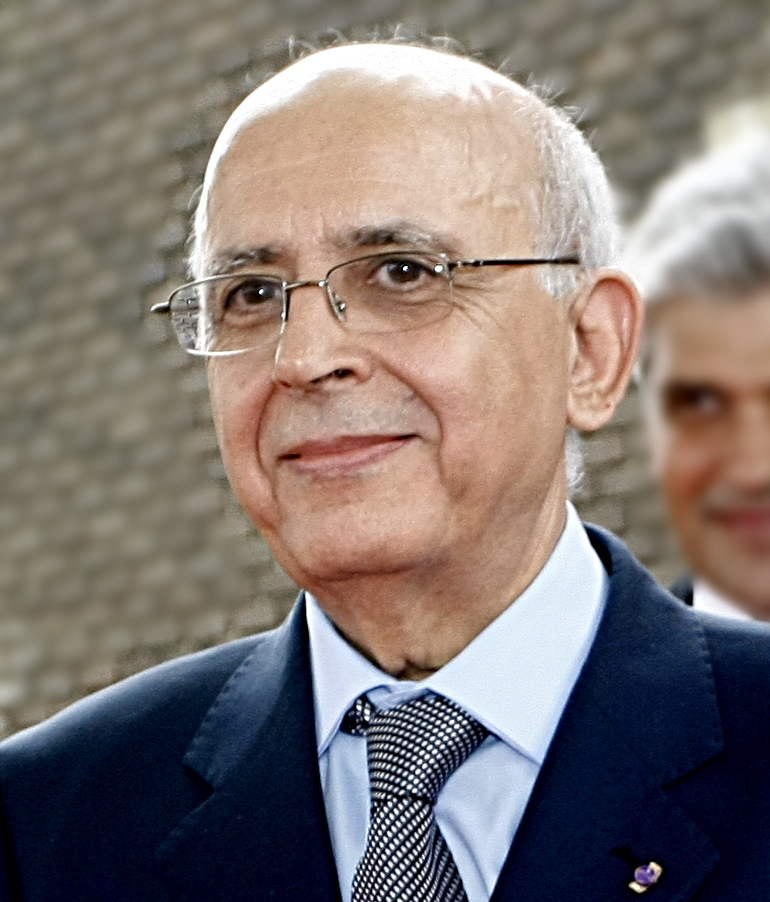
- Ghannouchi in 2013

Interim President of Tunisia
- In office 14 January 2011 – 15 January 2011
- Prime Minister: Himself
- Preceded by: Zine El Abidine Ben Ali
- Succeeded by: Fouad Mebazaa (acting)

Prime Minister of Tunisia
- In office 17 November 1999 – 27 February 2011
- President: Zine El Abidine Ben Ali; Himself; Fouad Mebazaa (Acting)
- Preceded by: Hamed Karoui
- Succeeded by: Béji Caïd Essebsi

Personal details
- Born: 18 August 1941 (age 85) Sousse, French Tunisia
- Party: Independent (2011–present)
- Other political affiliations: Constitutional Democratic Rally (Before 2011)
- Children: 2
- Education: Tunis University

Mohamed Ghannouchi (Arabic: محمد الغنوشي, romanized: Muḥammad Al-Ghannūshī; born 18 August 1941) is a Tunisian politician who was Prime Minister of Tunisia from 1999 to 2011. Regarded as a technocrat, Ghannouchi was a long-standing figure in the Tunisian government under President Zine El Abidine Ben Ali. He also served as the President of Tunisia from 14 to 15 January 2011, holding the powers and duties of the office nominally for the absent President Zine El Abidine Ben Ali, who had fled the country due to the 2011 revolution. On 15 January 2011 the presidency was declared vacant by the Constitutional Court and Ben Ali's term was officially terminated, leading to Speaker of Parliament Fouad Mebazaa taking office as Acting President. Ghannouchi stayed on as prime minister for six more weeks after Ben Ali's overthrow before himself resigning.

== Political career ==
Ghannouchi was a member of the Tunisian parliament for the Democratic Constitutional Rally. He was the Minister of Finance from 1989 to 1992. From 1992 to 1999, he served as Minister of International Co-operation and Foreign Investment, and from 1999 to 2011 he was the Prime Minister of Tunisia, making him the longest serving prime minister since the proclamation of independence, surpassing his predecessor Hamed Karoui.

After the fall of President Zine El Abidine Ben Ali on 14 January 2011 in the wake of the 2010–2011 Tunisian uprising, he was the self-proclaimed acting president of the country for a few hours starting on 14 January 2011, under Article 56 of the Constitution of Tunisia. He remained prime minister for six weeks before stepping down.

=== WikiLeaks description ===
In a 2006 diplomatic cable from the United States diplomatic cables leak, Ghannouchi was described as being generally popular among the population of Tunisia. Passport, a blog by Foreign Policy, gave a different view of Ghannouchi, saying he "is not necessarily any more popular than Ben Ali, though he's not nearly as tainted by the lurid tales of corruption and excess that so damaged the ruling family. But Tunisians certainly don't respect the prime minister; they call him 'Mr. Oui Oui' because he's always saying yes to Ben Ali".

=== Role following 2010–2011 Tunisian uprising ===
On 14 January 2011, before Ben Ali had fled the country during the Tunisian Revolution, Ghannouchi announced that Ben Ali had called for parliamentary elections in six months, dismissed the government, and asked him to form a new government. During the evening, Ghannouchi announced that he was taking temporary control of the country on state television. Ghannouchi promised to begin discussing political and economic reforms the next day. Ghannouchi said he would hold new elections within sixty days, as required by the Tunisian Constitution. On January 15, The Economist reported that some protesters were calling for Ghannouchi to step down. On that same day, it was announced that Congress Speaker Fouad Mebazaa was taking the post of Acting President of Tunisia.

Al Jazeera claimed that some lawyers disagreed with Ghannouchi's claim to power, interpreting the constitution differently, in particular referring to Article 57.

Afterwards he resumed as prime minister and formed a new national unity government that included members of opposition parties, civil society representatives, and even a blogger, Slim Amamou, who only a week previously had been imprisoned by the regime of the deposed President.

Ghannouchi resigned his membership of the RCD on 18 January. His resignation was followed by similar actions from other RCD members within the government; but on 27 January, Ghannouchi carried out a major reshuffle of the government to remove most former RCD members other than himself.

After a new wave of protests, Ghannouchi resigned as PM on 27 February 2011. The current whereabouts of Ghannounchi to this day are unknown, but it is likely Ghannounchi is still residing in Tunisia with his family.

== Awards and honors ==
- Knight of the Order of Independence (Tunisia)
- Grand Cordon of the Order of the Republic of Tunisia
- Grand Cordon of the National Order of Merit of Tunisia
- Grand Cordon of the Order of 7 November
- Grand Cordon of the Order of the Rising Sun (Japan)

== Personal life ==
Ghannouchi is married and has two children.

== See also ==
- Ghannouchi II Cabinet

Political offices
Preceded by Hamed Karoui	Prime Minister of Tunisia; 1999–2011	Succeeded by Beji Caid Essebsi
