= Chaambi Operations =

2012 battle in Tunisia

Coordinates: 35.2064°N 8.6825°E

- Part of the insurgency in the Maghreb
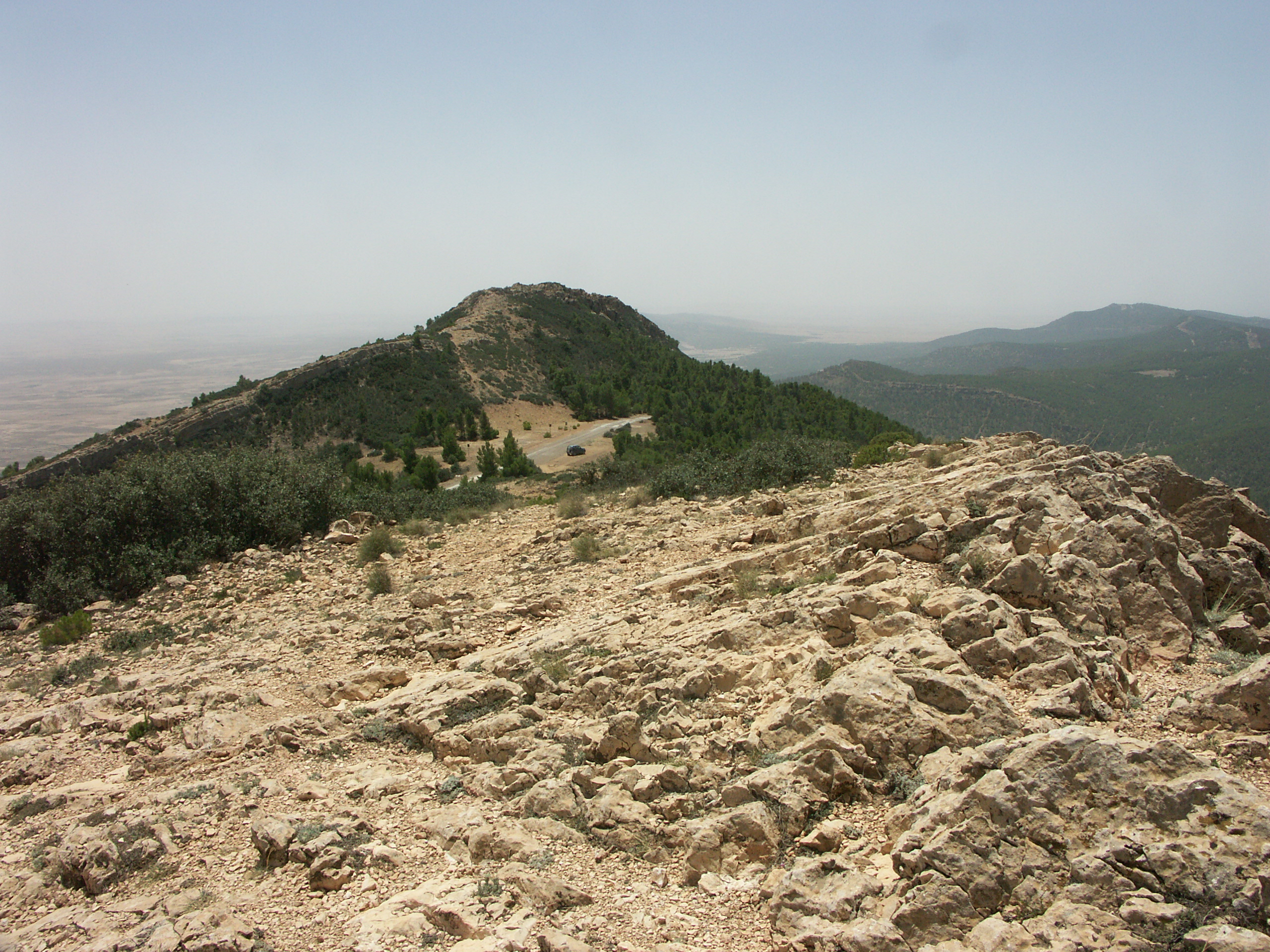
- View from the top of Mount Chambi in 2008.
Date	10 December 2012 – 1 December 2019
Location	Jebel ech Chambi
Status	Tunisian victory; Tunisian National Guard eliminates Okba Ibn Nafaa commanders on 28 March 2015 and continues to eliminate many more afterwards.; Declaration of certain mountain areas as military locked zones that require prior authorization to enter for non-military entities.

Belligerents
Tunisia	Ansar al-Sharia; AQIM; Uqba ibn Nafi Brigade

Commanders and leaders
(Tunisia) Kais Saied; Former commanders: (Tunisia) Moncef Marzouki; (Tunisia) Beji Caid Essebsi †; (Tunisia) Mohamed Ennaceur; (Tunisia) Hamadi Jebali; (Tunisia) Ali Laarayedh; (Tunisia) Mehdi Jomaa; (Tunisia) Habib Essid; (Tunisia) Youssef Chahed; (Tunisia) Elyes Fakhfakh; (Tunisia) Hichem Mechichi; (Tunisia) Najla Bouden; (Tunisia) Lotfi Ben Jeddou; (Tunisia) Mohamed Najem Gharsalli; (Tunisia) Hédi Majdoub; (Tunisia) Lotfi Brahem; (Tunisia) Hichem Fourati; (Tunisia) Ridha Gharsallaoui; (Tunisia) Taoufik Charfeddine; (Tunisia) Rachid Sabbagh; (Tunisia) Ghazi Jeribi; (Tunisia) Farhat Horchani; (Tunisia) Abdelkarim Zbidi; (Tunisia) Mohamed Karim El Jamoussi; (Tunisia) Imed Hazgui; (Tunisia) Brahim Bartagi	Khaled Chaieb (Lokman Abou Sakhr) †; Mourad Chaieb (Aouf Abu Al-Mudjahed); Abd Al-Kader Dabbar (Haroun) †; Seifallah Ben Hassine (Abu Iyadh); Abu Anas Al-Djazayiri; Kamel Zaghrouf (Muawiya Abou Hamza) †; Anas El Atri (Abu Anas) †; Mourad Gharsalli †; Abu Sofiane Al-Soufi †; Moussa Abu Rahla (Abu Daoud); Mohammad Al-Arbi Ben Messaoud (Yahya Abu Saad); Abu Abdulrahman; Abu Ahmad Al-Djazayiri

Units involved
Tunisian Army; Tunisian National Guard	No specific units

Strength
6,000 soldiers (August 2014)	80 (2018)

Casualties and losses
57 killed^{[a]} 60 wounded	200 killed 1,500 captured
- ^{a} 21 National Guard, 14 GFS, and 1 Customs Guard.

The Chaambi Operations, or Battle of Chaambi were part of the insurgency in the Maghreb. In December 2012, the Tunisian Army launched an offensive against the Salafist jihadists in Jebel ech Chambi near Kasserine. The conflict ended with the victory of the Tunisian Army in 2019.

== Timeline ==
=== 2013 ===
On June 6, a Tunisian vehicle hit a roadside bomb in Doghra in Jebel Chambi. Two soldiers were killed and two others wounded. According to the Tunisian government, the jihadists belonged to the militias of Okba ibn Nafaâ, an al-Qaida cell in the Islamic Maghreb (AQIM), and Ansar al-Sharia. The latter group, led by Seifallah Ben Hassine, known as "Abu Iyadh," however, says they have no connection with the clashes delivered in Jebel Chambi.

On July 18, in the wilaya of El Oued, the Algerian army intercepted a pickup truck loaded with weapons from Libya to Jebel Chambi; two of its occupants were killed.

On July 29, around 6 pm, a group of Tunisian soldiers were ambushed in Sabaa Diar, in Jebel Chambi. Their truck was strafed by some thirty rebel Salafists, with several soldiers being disarmed and executed. Eight soldiers were killed and three others injured, one fatally, and several bodies were slaughtered. According to Mohamed Ali Aroui, spokesman for the Interior Ministry, Gadhgadhi Kamel, suspected of being the murderer of Chokri Belaid, took part in the slaughters. The same day at Talla an army vehicle hit a mine, wounding three men.

On the evening of August 1, the Tunisian army launched an offensive on the Djebel Chambi with ground forces and air force, saying combat katiba Okba Ibn Nafaâ. The clashes that occurred during the night of August 3–4 would have left a dozen rebels dead. On August 4, a Tunisian military vehicle hit a mine; a soldier was killed and seven wounded. One of the soldiers died of his wounds the following day, bringing to fourteen the number of military and Tunisian national guard officers killed in Jebel Chambi since December 2012.

On August 5, three insurgents fleeing the mountain killed by Algerian forces deployed to the border in the region of Bir el-Ater, in Tébessa.

On August 6, the interior minister, Lotfi Ben Jeddou says that 140 Salafists took part in the fighting in the Jebel Chambi and that 46 of them were captured.

Four jihadists were killed on the evening of August 7.

On August 11, four jihadists were killed and four others captured.

On August 27, the Tunisian government, which includes Ennahda, the Congress for the Republic, Ettakatol, accuses Ansar al-Sharia of being linked to al-Qaeda and of being responsible for political assassinations and attacks in the Jebel Chambi. Ansar al-Sharia then classified by the government as a terrorist organization.

On September 1, the spokesman of the Ministry of Interior, Mohamed Ali Aroui, said that the number of Salafist rebels entrenched in the Jebel is no more than thirty. According to two prisoners interviewed, fifteen of these fighters are Algerians; the others are Malians, Mauritanians and Tunisians.

In a statement to Ennahdha, AQIM said he had no connection with the fighting in Jebel Chambi and said he respected Ayman al-Zawahiri an instruction not to target governments born of the Arab revolutions.

On September 25, Minister Ben Jeddou says fourteen Islamists, Ansar al-Sharia and AQIM, which Kamel Gadhgadhi founded, are still active in Jebel Chambi and fourteen others in Samama. He argues that these insurgents are known to the police and twelve of them are Algerians. He also believes that Seifallah Ben Hassine has probably fled to Libya.

In early October, according to an Algerian jihadist prisoner captured in Illizi, 17 men were sent as reinforcements from Libya on the orders of Djamel Okasha.

On the night of October 11 to 12, a unit of the anti-terrorism brigade stormed a house in Kasserine after learning that Mourad Gharsalli had descended the mountain to visit his family. However, the attack fails, and, after an hour of shooting that partially destroyed the house, jihadists manage to escape. The military did grab a phone and some ammunition.

In November, the Tunisian army carried out several bombings in Jebel Chambi, including from November 12 to 13, 20 to 21, and on December 26. A mine exploded north of Jebel Chambi; a Special Forces officer, Captain Youssef Dridi, was killed and another injured.

On December 21 and 22, eight people suspected of being connected with the jihadists were arrested in Chaambi. After identifying suspicious movements, the Tunisian army bombed the mountain on the nights of December 27 to 28, then from December 31 to January 1, and January 4.

=== 2014 ===
On February 1, 2014, three persons, including a "terrorist" and two "accomplices" accused of funding insurgent Salafists, were arrested by the Tunisian National Guards (TNG) in Jebel Chambi. Further north, five others are captured in Jendouba. According to the Ministry of Interior they are members of a cell involved in the supply of jihadists in Jebel Chaambi.

The army carried out new bombing on 4 and 6 February. 7. A Moroccan jihadist described as "hungry" and in "a state of extreme exhaustion" was arrested near the Algerian border; he tried to flee the Djebel Chambi where climatic conditions are harsh due to heavy snowfall.

On April 16, 2014, the Tunisian army sent reinforcements to the Djebel Chambi, which is declared a "closed military zone.". All access to the mountain were sealed off by the Tunisian and Algerian armies. 10,000 soldiers were involved in the operation.

On the morning of April 18, after an exchange of fire between Tunisian soldiers and insurgents, a vehicle of the Tunisian army hit a mine near Henchir Talla, inside the closed military zone. The driver was killed, and three other soldiers were wounded. Between 18 and 22, two jihadists were killed, and the charred body of a third fighter, probably killed by bombing the previous day, was also found. On April 23, clashes are taking place outside of the closed military zone in an industrial area on the road to Kasserine, in Kef. On the morning of April 24, F-5 aircraft bombed the mountain with support of helicopters.

On May 1, the Tunisian army regained control of Jebel Chambi without encountering resistance, and Tunisian flags were planted on four peaks of the mountain. The jihadists are believed to have fallen back on the Jebel Salloum, which is bombed by aircraft and artillery. According to security sources in the newspaper Le Maghreb, 70% of the total area of the mountain is under control of the Tunisian army.

On May 5, security units in Kasserine stopped eight people suspected of providing logistical support to insurgents in Chaambi. According to the Interior Ministry, they provided food, phone chips, cameras, money, and ammunition and gave them information about the movements of the security forces. The same day, in the closed military zone of Chaambi, Tunisian soldiers opened fire on two men who refused to obey the summons of the soldiers; one of them managed to escape, and the other was killed. According to the Ministry of Defense, the last person named Ben Ali Mabrouk Yahyaoui was wanted, and military equipment and a large amount of ammunition were found on site. The second man was finally caught while trying to hide in a house. This version of the story is disputed by other sources who claim that Yahyaoui was killed while he was alone, that he was not wanted for business flights, and had no connection with jihadists.

On May 6, Tunisian President Moncef Marzouki visited Jebel Chambi and promised amnesty to insurgents who were willing to render aid, provided they had not committed any crimes. "We decided at the last Security Council that there would be amnesty and reconciliation for those who do not have their hands soiled with blood. Those still have a place in our people. "On May 7, Atef Boughatas, Governor of Kasserine, said that the reserve of Djebel Chambi has been "cleansed" of all its mines. On May 8, the Tunisian army had taken 80% of the Djebel Chambi.

On May 16, the trail to the reserve of Chaambi was reopened. On May 23, the explosion of a mine passage in a vehicle of the Tunisian army caused the deaths of two soldiers and injured four injured.

On June 17, the prime minister, Mehdi Jomaa, says that security forces and the army "took control of Mount Châambi, which now is no longer a safe haven for terrorists, despite the ability to withdraw these reliefs to neighboring and their attempts to carry out further terrorist operations."

On July 16 to 19, two monitoring stations of the army attacked simultaneously by two groups of jihadists, forming total forty to sixty men who opened fire with machine guns and rocket launchers RPG-7: Fifteen soldiers were killed and twenty injured, according to the Ministry of Defense; the press service of the ministry said that "this is the heaviest record to be recorded by the army since independence in 1956." An attacker was also killed in the clash. The attack was claimed by katiba Ibn Okba Nafa, linked to AQIM This katiba, with a strong 70 to 100 fighters divided into small groups of 25 to 30 men is controlled by Lokman Abu Sakhr.

On August 3, Islamist fighters attacked a military base in Sbeïtla, east Chambi: A soldier was killed and a civilian wounded.

On September 16, two jihadists were killed in a battle against soldiers and Tunisian National Guards. Soon after, Katiba Okba Ibn Nafaâ left AQIM announced allegiance to the Islamic State.

=== 2015 ===
On March 28, the Elite Force of the National Guard Commandos USGN successfully killed 9 of Katiba Okba Ibn Nafaâ, including its Operational Leader Khaled Hammadi Chaeib (Luqman Abu Sakhr), and 5 more leaders of Algerian nationality in an ambush near Sidi Aïch, Gafsa. Investigation has also proved that one of the 9 terrorists is named Muawiyah Abu Hamza of Algerian nationality, Al-Qaeda leader of the "southern part", and the supervisor of "Luqman Abu Sakhr", Muawiyah is considered one of the biggest leaders of al-Qaeda in the Islamic Maghreb.

On 22 April, GFS (Tunisian Army's Special Force) and various special army units launched a military operation named Invasion of Kasserine's Mountains, the battle continued for 4 days between the two belligerents resulting in the death of confirmed 10 jihadists (likely more) including its new appointed Operational Leader "Abu Sofian Assufi", 3 GFS soldiers died in the same battle.

On June 5, two camps of terrorists were discovered on Mount Salloum after a sweeping operation conducted by the National Army. The Army has killed and injured 4 terrorists in the same day after they were spotted near the area of operations. Lieutenant Colonel Belhassan Oueslati said terrorist groups holed up in these camps were forced to leave them as a result of military attacks conducted by the Army. During the operation, national army units seized weapons and ammunition, grenades, binoculars, night vision goggles, computer equipment, photovoltaic panels, medicines, mobile phones, SIM cards, two national identity cards, a passport and food.

On 15 June, Tunisian intelligence have received intel about Two terrorists descending from Mount Salloum towards the small town of Bir El Hafey in Sidi Bouzid then Souk El Jedid, coordination has been established with the security units in the region in order to set up an ambush, once intercepting the two terrorists riding a motorcycle, they initiated opening fire and throwing a grenade directly towards the policemen, which resulted in the death of the Commander of the intervention regiment in Sidi Bouzid Captain "Monaam Gharsalli", the head of the Public police station in Hichria(town) First Lieutenant "Romdhane Khadhraoui", and two policemen injured by shrapnel, they were Resuscitated and sent to the Hospital. however, clashes continued afterwards, injuring one of the terrorists, they have decided to kidnap 8 citizens then steal a vehicle and went to the city of Sidi Ali Ben Aoun, after arriving in the city, they fired at a national guard member, First Caporal "Aymen Massaoudi", in front of the national guard station, he died later in the hospital. the Terrorists were trying to neutralize all the agents inside the national guard station, where they were surrounded by National Guard Special Units in coordination with the Military and Police units, the Operation resulted in neutralizing one terrorist named "Khaled Ben Kamel Al-Dhibi", and capturing the second terrorist named "Mahmoud Ghnimi" injured badly, which was wanted by the Anti Terrorism units. 2 AK-47s, 4 ammunition magazines, and a cell phone were seized after the Operation.

On 10 July, The Elite force of the National Guard USGN, the GFS (Tunisian Army's Special Forces) and other police units and following intel about terrorist activity in Mount Aarbata, Gafsa south of Kasserine, the combined forces have managed to kill 5 terrorists including a Leader named Mourad Gharsalli. 4 AK-47s, One Steyr AUG rifle, One Grenade and One pistol were seized during the Operation which is still ongoing.

On 9 August, USGN and Kasserine's National Guard's Commandos Unit UCGN has managed to eliminate "Haroun Al-Djazayiri" (Haroun the Algerian) rated as a dangerous terrorist by the Tunisian Authorities, in Mount Sammema east of Chaambi after ambushing the target. 1 AK-47, 1 Grenade, 1 Night Vision Goggles and a number of bullets was seized after the Operation.

On 23 August, One customs officer was killed and three other wounded in a terrorist attack that targeted, Sunday evening, a customs patrol in Jebel Esnak, Bouchebka (Kasserine). Terrorists took 3 Steyr AUG, 1 Pistol and an amount of money and number of bullets from the guards.

=== 2016 ===
On 30 March, a Tunisian border guard was injured in an ambush by around 15 militants near Fériana in Kasserine region.

On 29 August, three Tunisian soldiers were killed and seven more wounded after Islamic militants ambushed and fired rifles and rocket-propelled grenades at them near Mount Sammama.

=== 2017 ===
On 17 February, Tunisian soldiers shot dead 2 suspected jihadists in Kasserine Region, said the defence ministry. They also detained a suspected person and seized three firearms and ammunition during the operation.

On 28 May, Tunisian security forces killed a leading member of IS, known as Houssem Tlithi (born 1997) near the Algerian border. A day later, three people were arrested as part of an operation, according to the interior ministry.

=== 2018 ===
On 24 September, two people were killed in a truck by a landmine blast in the mountainous central regions of Tunisia.

On 3 October, A IED detonation struck an armored vehicle killing 2 soldiers and injuring 5 at Mount Chaambi of Tunisia, an Al-Qaeda wing in Tunisia claimed responsibility for the attack.
