= Ministry of the Interior (Tunisia) =

Government minister of Tunisia

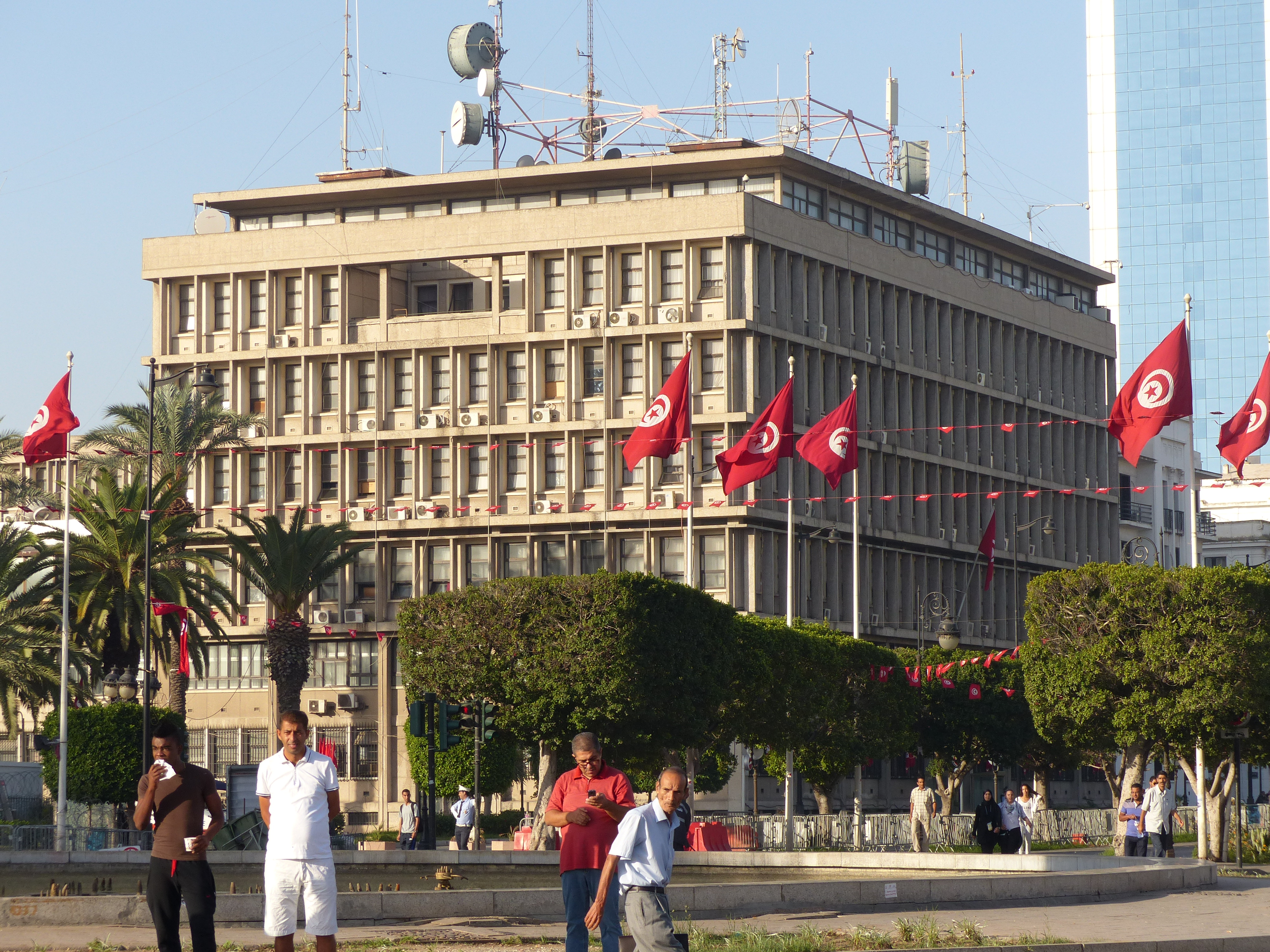
Tunisian Ministry of the Interior in October 2014

The Tunisian Ministry of the Interior is a government ministry of Tunisia, responsible mainly for internal affairs.

== 2011 communiqué ==
In a communiqué released on Monday 7 March 2011, the Tunisian Ministry of the Interior said it has already started implementing the following measures:

- Breaking definitely with any "political police" functions whether at the level of structure, mission or practices.
- Removing the State Security Division.
- Reasserting the commitment of the Interior Ministry to enforce the law and respect freedoms and civil rights.

In this communiqué the Interior Ministry said all these practical measures are in harmony with the values of the revolution and are designed to comply with the law, in theory and practice, in materialisation of the climate of confidence and transparency in the relationship between security services and the citizens. These measures, adds the communiqué, were also taken to overcome the deficiencies noted under the former regime. They are also part of the re-organisation of the Home Security structures by drawing inspiration on regulations in force in democratic States as well as the expertise and experiences of these countries.

These measures and decisions, said the communiqué, are part of the new approach of the Interior Ministry's competences and the will to continue the action already started to contribute to achieving the attributes of democracy, dignity and freedom.

== USGN ==
The National Guard Special Unit (USGN) (French: Unite Speciale' Garde Nationale) is a Tunisian counter-terrorism unit created in the 1980s and based in Hammamet. It appears to be part of the National Guard of Tunisia, itself part of the Ministry of the Interior (Tunisia).

== BAT ==
The Anti-terrorist Brigade (فرقة مجابهة الارهاب) or BAT, whose members are referred to as « black tigers », is the unit of the Tunisian national police specialized in paramilitary operations during particularly serious events. According to OTAN's definition, the BAT is a special force. Its role notably includes taking action during crisis situations, such as hostage-taking on boats, aircraft, in cities etc, arresting high-risk criminals, and contributing to the fight against terrorism. The BAT is based in Tunis, at the headquarters of the intervention units at the Bouchoucha barracks, with the training and education centre located in Béjal. Joining the unit comes along with highly strict requirements, especially in terms of physical, medical, mental and psychotechnical fitness; it recruits the best people of the national police. Its motto is "Speed. Force. Effectivity".

The unit comprises 50 men divided into three sections (two operational, one headquarters). The USGN is reinforced by the National Guard Commando Company (GCGN) (French: Groupment de Commando de la Garde Nationale).

== BNE ==
La Brigade nationale de détection et de neutralisation d'explosifs (الفوج الوطني للمتفجرات ) or BNE is a Tunisian brigade specialising in explosives and bomb disposal. It also contributes to the fight against terrorism. The BNE is based in the headquarters of the intervention units in Bouchoucha barracks (Tunis) but it is also present in the country's major cities and at all border crossings. Access to the unit requires very strict criteria, particularly with regard to physical fitness, medical, psychological and psychotechnical tests; it recruits from the best elements of the national police and specialists in chemistry and electronics. The agents have a double capacity: that of participating in armed interventions and that of artificers.

== List of ministers ==
- 1955–1956: Mongi Slim
- 1956–1965: Taïeb Mhiri
- 1965–1969: Beji Caid Essebsi
- 1969–1970: Hédi Khefacha
- 1970–1971: Ahmed Mestiri
- 1971: Hedi Amara Nouira
- 1971–1973: Hédi Khefacha
- 1973–1977: Tahar Belkhodja
- 1977: Abdallah Farhat
- 1977–1979: Mohammed El Azzabi
- 1979–1980: Othman Kechrid
- 1980–1984: Driss Guiga
- 1984–1986: Mohammed Mzali
- 1986–1987: Zine El Abidine Ben Ali
- 1987–1988: Habib Ammar
- 1988–1990: Chédli Neffati
- 1990–1991: Abdelhamid Escheikh
- 1991–1995: Abdallah Kallel
- 1995–1997: Mohamed Jegham
- 1997: Mohamed Ben Rejeb
- 1997–1999: Ali Chaouch
- 1999–2001: Abdallah Kallel
- 2001–2002: Abdallah Kaâbi
- 2002–2004: Hédi M'henni
- 2004–2011: Rafiq Belhaj Kacem
- 2011: Ahmed Friaa
- 2011: Farhat Rajhi
- 2011: Habib Essid
- 2011–2013: Ali Laarayedh
- 2013–2015: Lotfi Ben Jeddou
- 2015–2016: Mohamed Najem Gharsalli
- 2016–2017: Hédi Majdoub
- 2017–2018: Lotfi Brahem
- 2018–2020: Hichem Fourati
- 2020: Hichem Mechichi
- 2020–2021: Taoufik Charfeddine
- 2021: Hichem Mechichi
- 2021: Ridha Gharsallaoui
- 2021-2023: Taoufik Charfeddine
- 2023-2024: Kamel Feki
- 2024-Present: Khaled Nouri
