= Ministry of Defence (Tunisia) =

Government minister of Tunisia

Ministry of National Defence
- وزارة الدفاع الوطني

Agency overview
- Formed: 1957
- Jurisdiction: Government of Tunisia
- Headquarters: Tunis, Tunisia
- Agency executive: Imed Memmich, Minister of National Defence
- Website: www.defense.tn

The Ministry of National Defence (Arabic: وزارة الدفاع الوطني) is a government ministry office of the Republic of Tunisia, responsible for coordinating and supervising all agencies and functions of the government concerned directly with national security and the Tunisian Armed Forces. From 2021 to 2024, the Minister of National Defence has been Imed Memmich. The Minister is now Khaled Al-Suhaily.

== List of ministers ==
This is a list of defence ministers of Tunisia.

- 1956–1957: Habib Bourguiba
- 1957–1966: Bahi Ladgham
- 1966–1968: Ahmed Mestiri
- 1968: Bahi Ladgham
- 1968–1969: Mohammed Mzali
- 1969–1970: Beji Caid Essebsi
- 1970–1971: Hassib Ben Ammar
- 1971–1972: Béchir M'hedhbi
- 1972–1974: Abdallah Farhat
- 1974–1976: Hédi Khefacha
- 1976–1979: Abdallah Farhat
- 1979–1980: Rachid Sfar
- 1980–1988: Slaheddine Baly
- 1988–1991: Abdallah Kallel
- 1991: Habib Boularès
- 1991–1996: Abdelaziz Ben Dhia
- 1996–1997: Abdallah Kallel
- 1997–1999: Habib Ben Yahia
- 1999–2001: Mohamed Jegham
- 2001–2004: Dali Jazi
- 2004–2005: Hédi M'henni
- 2005–2010: Kamel Morjane
- 2010–2011: Ridha Grira
- 2011–2013: Abdelkarim Zbidi
- 2013–2014: Rachid Sabbagh
- 2014–2015: Ghazi Jeribi
- 2015–2017: Farhat Horchani
- 2017–2019: Abdelkarim Zbidi
- 2019–2020: Mohamed Karim El Jamoussi (interim)
- 2020–2021: Imed Hazgui
- 2021: Brahim Bartagi
- 2021–2024: Imed Memmich
- 202?: Khaled Al-Suhaily
