= Jomaa Cabinet =

Tunisian government

- Cabinet of Tunisia

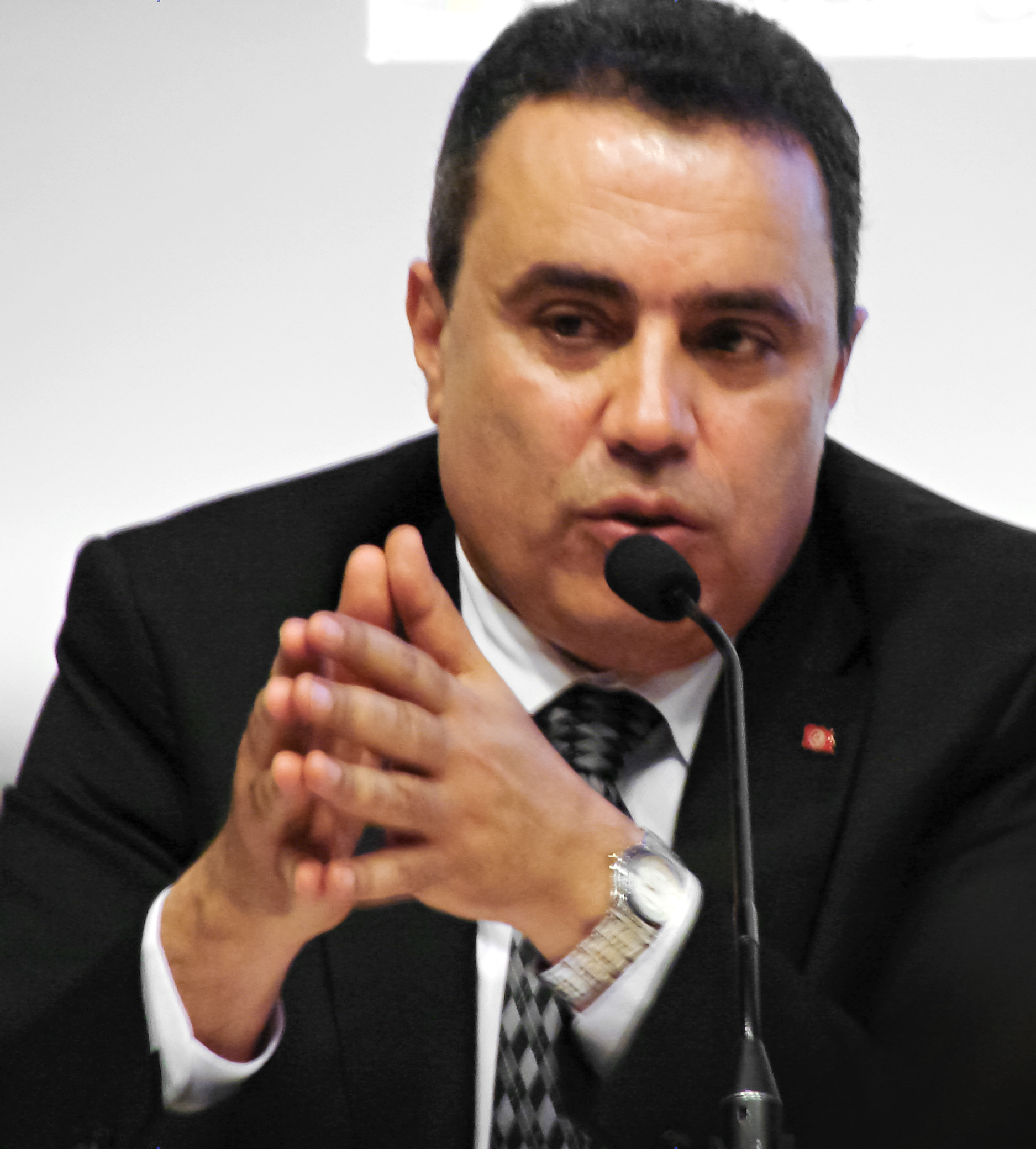
- Date formed: 29 January 2014
- Date dissolved: 6 February 2015 (1 year and 8 days)

People and organisations
- Head of state: Moncef Marzouki, Beji Caid Essebsi
- Head of government: Mehdi Jomaa
- Total no. of members: 29 (incl. Prime Minister)
- Member parties: Independent politicians External support: Ennahda, Ettakatol, CPR ("Troika")
- Status in legislature: Technocratic government

History
- Election: 2011 Constituent Assembly election
- Legislature term: Constituent Assembly (2011–2014)
- Predecessor: Laarayedh Cabinet (2013–14)
- Successor: Essid Cabinet (2015–2016)

The cabinet of Tunisian Head of Government Mehdi Jomaa was approved on 29 January 2014. The cabinet consists of 21 ministries and 7 secretaries of state.

== Cabinet members ==
Office	Name	Party
Head of Government	Mehdi Jomaa	Independent
Minister of Defence	Ghazi Jeribi	Independent
Minister of Justice	Hafedh Ben Sala	Independent
Minister of Interior	Lotfi Ben Jeddou	Independent
Minister of Foreign Affairs	Mongi Hamdi	Independent
Minister of Economy and Finance	Hakim Ben Hammouda	Independent
Minister of Tourism	Amel Karboul	Independent
Minister of Industry, Energy and Mining	Kamel Ben Naceur	Independent
Minister of Agriculture	Lassaad Lachaal	Independent
Minister of Commerce and Handicrafts	Nejla Moalla Harrouch	Independent
Minister of Social Affairs	Ahmed Ammar Younbaii	Independent
Minister of Higher Education, Scientific Research and ICT	Taoufik Jelassi	Independent
Minister of Education	Fathi Jarray	Independent
Minister of Health	Mohamed Salah Ben Ammar	Independent
Minister of Transport	Chiheb Ben Ahmed	Independent
Minister of Equipment, Spatial Planning and Sustainable Development	Hedi Larbi	Independent
Minister of Employment and Vocational Training	Hafedh Laamouri	Independent
Minister of Religious Affairs	Mounir Tlili	Independent
Minister of Youth, Sports, Women and Family	Saber Bouatay	Independent
Minister of Culture	Mourad Sakli	Independent
Minister to the Prime Minister, in charge of Co-ordination and Monitoring of Economic Affairs, Government spokesperson	Nidhal Ouerfelli	Independent
Minister delegate to the Minister of Interior in charge of Security	Ridha Sfar	Independent
Secretary of State to the Prime Minister, in charge of Governance and Public Service	Anouar Ben Khelifa	Independent
Secretary of State for Regional and Local Affairs	Abderrazak Ben Khelifa	Independent
Secretary of State for Foreign Affairs	Fayçal Gouiaa	Independent
Secretary of State in charge of Women and Family	Neila Chaabane	Independent
Secretary of State for Development and International Co-operation	Noureddine Zekri	Independent
Secretary of State for State Domains	Mohamed Karim El Jamoussi	Independent
Secretary of State for Sustainable Development	Mounir Majdoub	Independent
