= Abdallah Kallel =

Tunisian politician

President of the Chamber of Advisors
- In office 16 August 2005 – 25 January 2011

Abdallah Kallel (عبد الله القلال) (born 7 December 1943, Sfax) is a Tunisian politician. He was the President of the Chamber of Advisors from 16 August 2005 until 25 January 2011.

== Biography ==
Coming from a modest family of five (his father is a farmer and his mom, a homemaker), he joined the first class of the National School of Administration (ENAM) after a master's degree in economics from the Faculty of Law and Economics of Tunis.

During the presidency of Habib Bourguiba, he was successively attached cabinet to the Ministry of the Interior and Equipment (1972), chief of staff of Defense Ministers Abdallah Farhat and Rachid Sfar. Terminated in 1980, he taught for thirteen months at ENAM then became CEO of a company specializing in building.

On 11 April 1988, he became Minister of Defense before replacing General Abdelhamid Escheikh at the head of the Ministry of the Interior from 17 February 1991 to 24 January 1995, in a context of struggle against Islamism. He became an advisor to President Zine el-Abidine Ben Ali, he headed the Ministry of Defense from June 13, 1996 to January 22, 1997, moved to the Ministry of Justice in 1997-1999 before becoming Minister of the Interior for the second time November 17, 1999. On January 23, 2001, following the filing of a complaint of torture against him, President Ben Ali decided to temporarily remove him from politics.

Three years later, he was appointed in January 2004 as President of the Economic and Social Council. After the creation of the House of Councilors and its installation, he was elected on August 16. Treasurer of the Democratic Constitutional Rally (RCD) from 1988, he was a member of his political bureau and its central committee until his removal from the party on January 18, 2011.

On February 14, 2001, he was at the Cantonal Hospital of Geneva where he underwent a triple coronary bypass after having a discomfort. While Hatem Ben Salem was seen by an employee of the hospital, he called Abdennacer Nait-Liman, a Tunisian political refugee living in Geneva since 1995 and president of an association of victims of torture in Tunisia. He informed Éric Sottas, director of the World Organization against Torture in Geneva, and lawyer François Françoisz, and lodged a complaint against Kallel for "grievous bodily harm, kidnapping, insults, endangering the health, constraints and abuse of authority"; Naït-Liman was indeed tortured in the premises of the Ministry of the Interior between April 22 and June 1, 1992. If he had testified eight months earlier in the book Torture in Tunisia. 1987–2000. Plea for abolition and against impunity, the name of Kallel was not mentioned. The complaint was dismissed in February 2001 and then appealed on May 22, 2007. This initiative was a first for the Swiss prosecutor's office but Kallel leaves the territory in time thanks to the diplomatic passport that confers on him his rank of minister. Sottas accused him of being "responsible for the torture of thousands of people".

On January 23, 2011, after the revolution, he was placed under house arrest before resigning from the presidency of the House of Councilors two days later. He was arrested on 12 March, following a complaint filed by a group of 24 lawyers for a charge of embezzlement within the RCD. On the 14th of March his property was seized by decree; he was then interrogated on May 14, concluded by a warrant of committal. On 21 May, the State Litigation Officer lodged an urgent complaint for the freezing of the assets of Kallel's properties; his property was sequestrated three days later.

Abdallah Kallel was hospitalized on July 22 at the military hospital of Tunis, in a state considered quite serious by his family, following a cardiac malaise; this one points out its conditions of detention to explain the deterioration of its state of health.

On 29 November, the Criminal Chamber of the Tunisian Permanent Military Court of First Instance sentenced him to four years in prison in the case of Barraket Essahel, reduced to two years in prison on appeal on 7 April 2012. On July 10, 2013, he was released at the end of his sentence.
