= Ali Chaouch =

Tunisian politician (1948–2020)

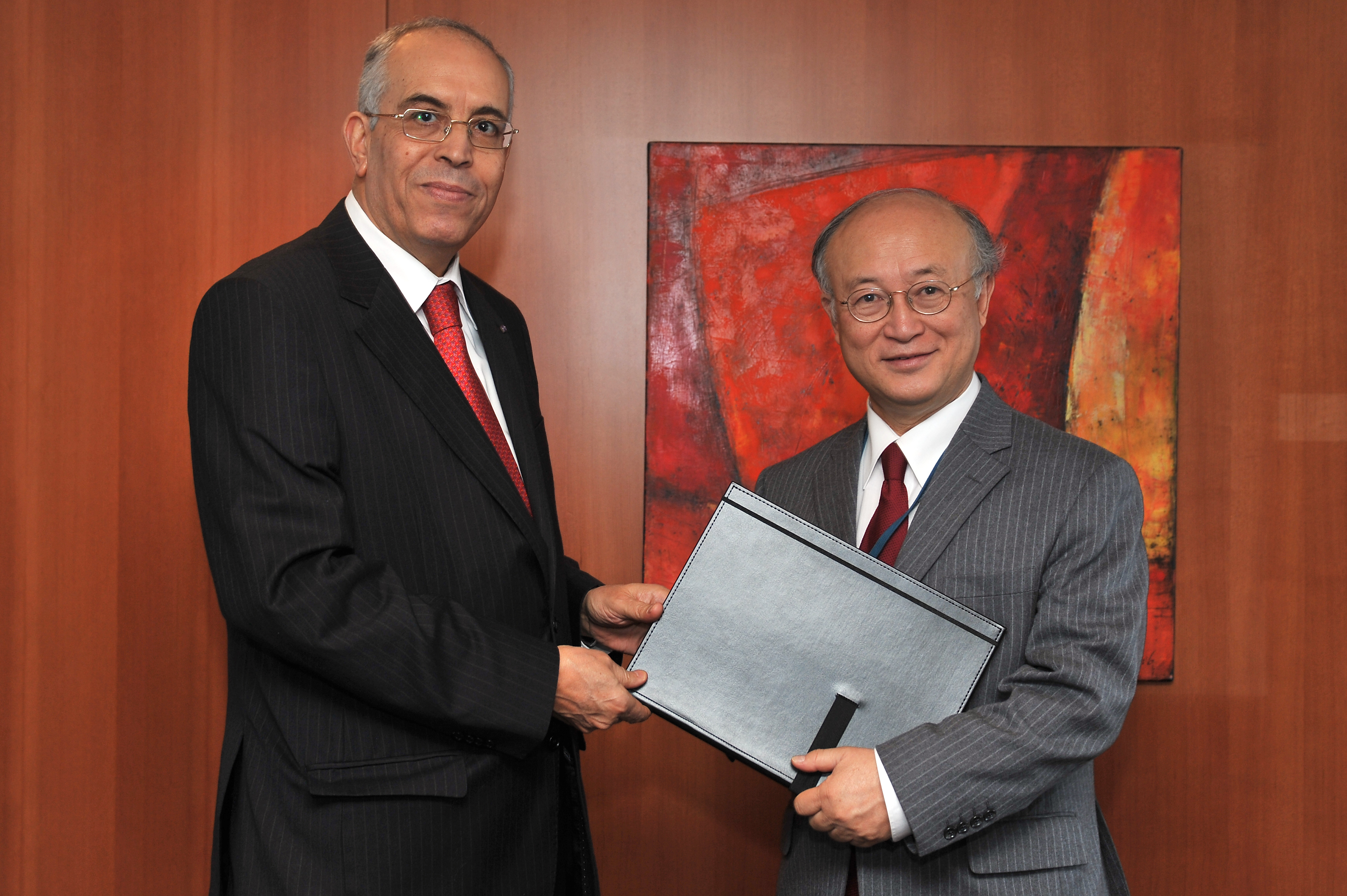
- Chaouch (left) and Yukiya Amano, director of the International Atomic Energy Agency

Tunisian Minister of Housing and Equipment
- In office 15 June 1993 – 9 October 1997
- Preceded by: Mohamed Charfeddine Gallouz
- Succeeded by: Slaheddine Belaïd

Tunisian Minister of the Interior
- In office 9 October 1997 – 17 November 1999
- Preceded by: Mohamed Ben Rejeb
- Succeeded by: Abdallah Kallel

Secretary General of the Democratic Constitutional Rally
- In office 5 December 2000 – 18 August 2005

Tunisian Minister of Social Affairs
- In office 17 August 2005 – 14 January 2010
- Preceded by: Chédli Neffati
- Succeeded by: Naceur El Gharbi

Personal details
- Born: 26 June 1948 Bou Arada, French Tunisia
- Died: 17 August 2020 (aged 72)
- Party: RCD

Ali Chaouch (26 June 1948 – 17 August 2020) was a Tunisian politician and government minister.

== Biography ==
Chaouch graduated from Tunis University in 1970 with a degree in economic science. He became director general of the Société d'économie mixte d'aménagement de Tunis in 1981, and he was nominated to be President-Director-General of the Agence de réhabilitation et de rénovation urbaine in 1982. After Zine El Abidine Ben Ali came to power, he was appointed leader of the Medenine Governorate on 21 November 1987, then became CEO of the Agence foncière de l'habitat.

Chaouch first entered government when he became a secretary to the Minister of Public Health on 31 July 1992. He then became Minister of Housing and Equipment on 15 June 1993, before heading the Ministry of the Interior beginning on 9 October 1997 and ending on 17 November 1999. He was appointed to the Social and Economic Council before serving as Secretary General of the Democratic Constitutional Rally party from 5 December 2000 until 18 August 2005. He returned as a minister on 17 August 2005 as Minister of Social Affairs, serving until a government reshuffle on 14 January 2010. He was then appointed Ambassador to Austria and became Tunisia's representative to the International Atomic Energy Agency.

A lawsuit was filed against Chaouch on 6 May 2011 for abuse of power and misappropriation of public property.

Ali Chaouch died on 17 August 2020 at the age of 72.
