= Othman Kechrid =

Tunisian politician (1920–2021)

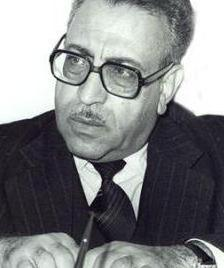

Minister of the Interior
- In office 8 November 1979 – 1 March 1980
- Preceded by: Dhaoui Hannablia
- Succeeded by: Driss Guiga

Minister of Relations with Tunisian Chamber of Deputies
- In office 27 December 1977 – 8 November 1979
- Preceded by: Moncef Bel Hadj Amor
- Succeeded by: Moncef Zaafrane

Personal details
- Born: 26 June 1920 Kairouan, French Tunisia
- Died: 23 February 2021 (aged 100)
- Party: Neo Destour; PSD

Othman Kechrid (Arabic: عثمان كشريد) (26 June 1920 – 23 February 2021) was a Tunisian politician.

== Biography ==
Kechrid attended primary school in Hajeb El Ayoun and secondary school in Sousse. In 1942, he graduated from the École normale supérieure de Tunisie and became a primary school teacher. He also joined the Neo Destour party, which sought to gain independence from France. In 1944, he became a math and science teacher at the Cours complémentaire de Kairouan. In 1949, he began studying law. On 16 November 1953, he began working at the General Secretariat and became chief of staff to the Minister of Finance, the first to hold the title since Tunisian independence. On 16 January 1961, he was appointed Deputy Director of External Finances.

On 2 April 1962, Kechrid founded the Office du commerce de Tunisie, of which he was the first CEO. Ahmed Ben Salah, former Secretary of State of the Economy, discussed Kechrid's departure from the office with the following statement: "Othman Kechrid, director of the Trade Office, one day came to see me to hand in his resignation because Béchir Zerglayoun had arrived in his office, asking him for favors, playing his revolver". In 1967, he became trade director and deputy general manager of the company El Bouniane. On 3 July 1973, he became Secretary General of the Ministry of the Interior, a position in which he launched a computerization program for the ministry's administration.

On 27 December 1977, Kechrid became the Minister of Relations with the Chamber of Deputies and Secretary General of the Government, appointed by President Habib Bourguiba. On 8 November 1979, he became Minister of the Interior, serving until 1 March 1980, when he was succeeded by Driss Guiga. On 23 October 1980, he became a technical advisor to President Bourguiba.

Aside from his political career, Kechrid founded several companies, including Ellouhoum, Ethimar, the Société des articles populaires, Société de cellulose de Kasserine, and a dozen other regional corporations. He was a member of the Social and Economic Council from 1970 to 1978.[5] He was a founding member of the École nationale d'administration de Tunisie. He was also a member of Les Scouts Tunisiens.

Othman Kechrid died on 23 February 2021 at the age of 100.
