= El Watan Party (Tunisia) =

Tunisian political party

Homeland Party حزب الوطن
- French name: Parti de la patrie
- Abbreviation: Al Watan
- Founded: 19 February 2011
- Dissolved: 9 March 2013
- Split from: Constitutional Democratic Rally
- Merged into: Free Destourian Party
- Ideology: Centrism; Bourguibism
- Colors: Light blue and Red

Website
- www.parti-alwatan.tn

The Homeland Party (Tunisian Arabic: حزب الوطن, Ḥizb el-Waṭan; French: Parti de la patrie) or El Watan Party was a centrist party in Tunisia, that was launched on 19 February 2011 and officially licensed on 9 March 2011.

It was founded by Mohamed Jegham, former minister of trade and tourism, Ahmed Friaa, former minister of the interior in the Government of Mohamed Ghannouchi, and ten other leaders. Both Jegham and Friaa come from the ranks of the old dominant party Constitutional Democratic Rally, sustaining the Zine El Abidine Ben Ali regime. On 13 June 2011, Friaa announced his resignation from the party to clear the way for younger politicians.
