= Ahmed Friaa =

Tunisian politician

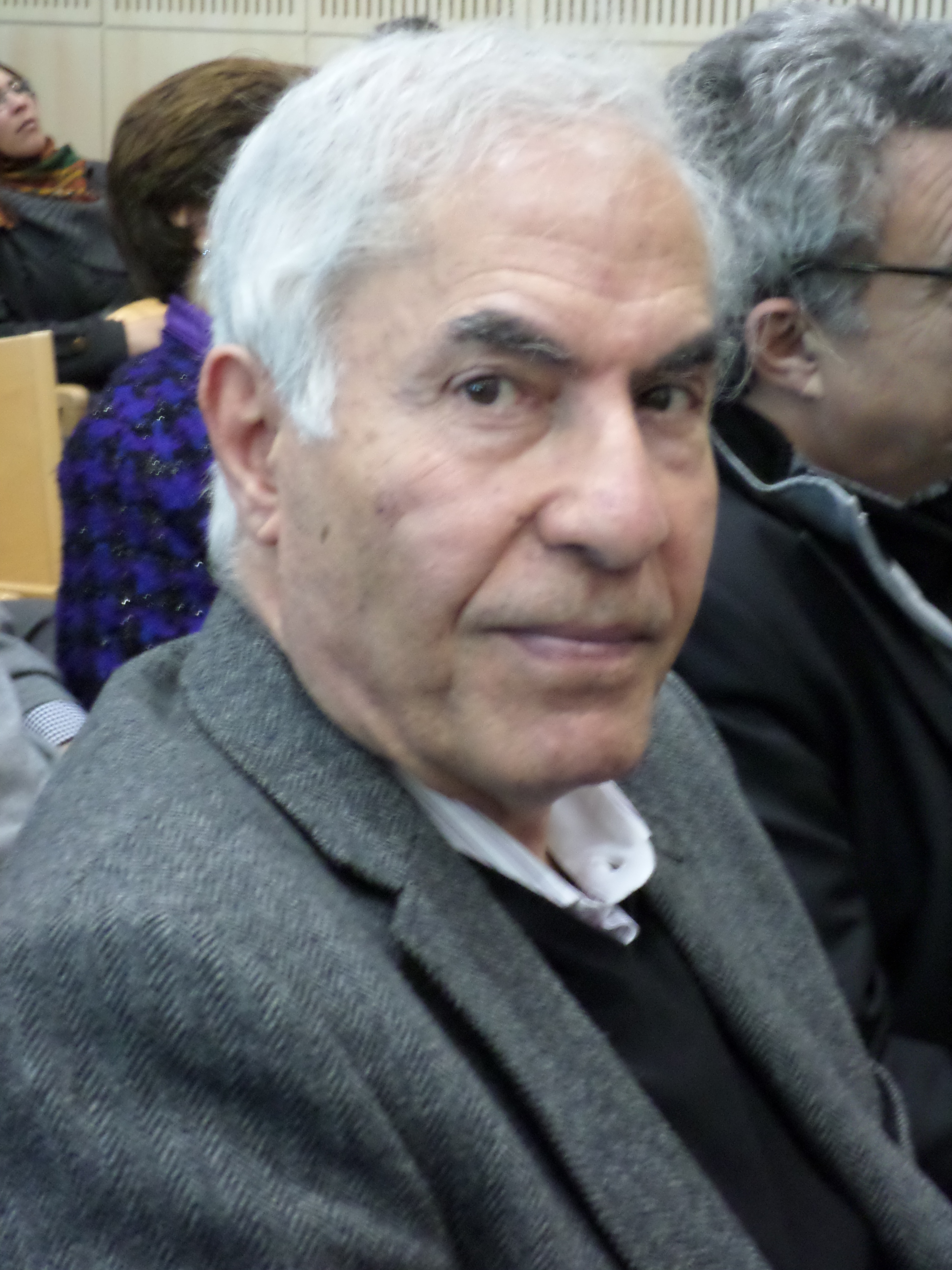

Minister of the Interior
- In office 12 January 2011 – 27 January 2011
- President: Zine El Abidine Ben Ali; Fouad Mebazaa (interim)
- Prime Minister: Mohamed Ghannouchi
- Preceded by: Rafiq Belhaj Kacem
- Succeeded by: Farhat Rajhi

Personal details
- Born: February 19, 1949 (age 77) Zarzis, Tunisia
- Party: Constitutional Democratic Rally; Homeland Party
- Children: 4
- Education: Tunis University; Paris VI University
- Profession: mathematician

Ahmed Friaa (Tunisian Arabic: أحمد فريعة) (born February 19, 1949) was the Minister of the Interior of Tunisia for two weeks in January 2011, during the peak of Tunisian revolution.

== Biography ==
Ahmed Friaa was born in 1949. He holds a PhD from the Paris-Sorbonne University.

He served as Housing Minister, then Education Minister, followed by Ambassador to Italy. On January 12, 2011, following the dismissal of Rafiq Belhaj Kacem, he was appointed Minister of the Interior. On 27 January 2011 he was replaced by Farhat Rajhi. He was a founding member of the Homeland Party in early March, but announced his retirement on 14 June 2011.
