= Abdelkarim Zbidi =

Tunisian politician (born 1950)

Abdelkrim Zbidi
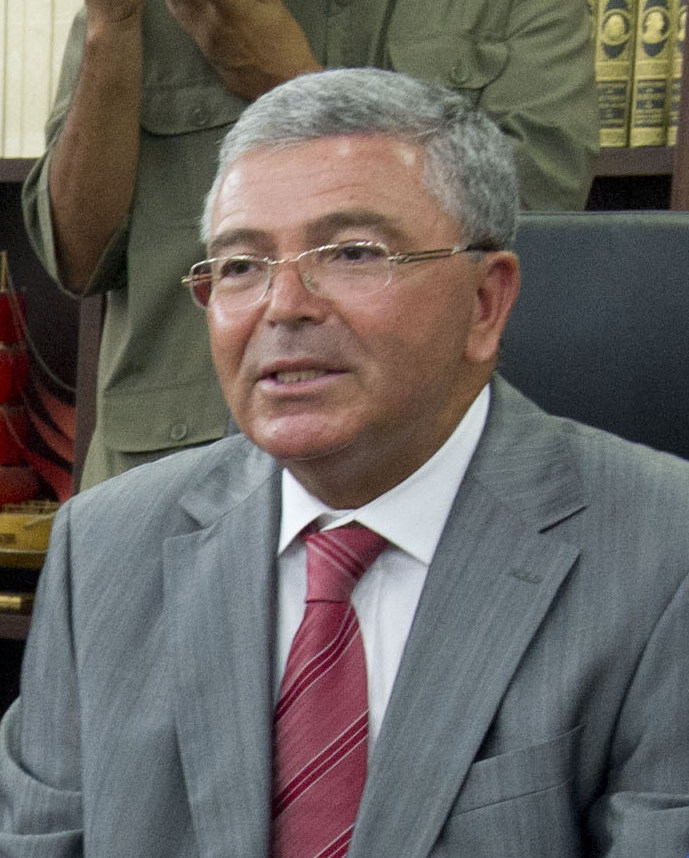

Minister of National Defence
- In office 12 September 2017 – 29 October 2019
- Prime Minister: Youssef Chahed
- Preceded by: Farhat Horchani
- Succeeded by: Mohamed Karim El Jamoussi
- In office 27 January 2011 – 13 March 2013
- Prime Minister: Mohamed Ghannouchi; Béji Caïd Essebsi
- Preceded by: Ridha Grira
- Succeeded by: Rachid Sabbagh

Minister of Health
- In office 23 January 2001 – 8 October 2001
- Prime Minister: Mohamed Ghannouchi
- Preceded by: Hédi M'henni
- Succeeded by: Habib M'barek

Personal details
- Born: 25 June 1950 (age 76) Rejiche, Mahdia, French Tunisia
- Party: Independent
- Spouse: Faïza Zbidi (m. 1978)
- Children: 1
- Education: Claude Bernard University Lyon 1
- Profession: Doctor

Abdelkrim Zbidi (born 25 June 1950 in Rejiche) is a Tunisian politician.

== Biography ==
He holds a doctorate of medicine from the University Claude Bernard of Lyon, a master's degree in human physiology and functional exploitations, a master's degree in human pharmacology, a diploma of advanced studies in human physiology and a degree in studies and research in human biology.

He became coordinator of the training of senior health technicians at the faculty of medicine of Sousse between 1981 and 1988; He also held several positions at the Faculty: Head of the Department of Basic Sciences from 1982 to 1989 and Professor of Hospital and University from 1987. He is also Head of Department of Functional Investigations at Farhat-Hached Hospital in Sousse between 1990 and 1999.

He is responsible from 1992 for missions of expertise in the field of medical applications of the nuclear power at the International Atomic Energy Agency.

He chairs the College of Physiology and Functional Explorations, between 1994 and 1997, reporting to the Ministry of Public Health and Central University from 1995 to 1999; he is also dean of the faculty of medicine of Sousse between 2005 and 2008.

== Political career ==
During the reshuffle of 27 January 2011 of Prime Minister Mohamed Ghannouchi, he became minister of national defence. He replaced Ridha Grira who held the office only for ten days.

== Honours ==
- Commander of the Order of the Republic (Tunisia, 2011)
- Grand officer of the National Order of Merit of Tunisia (Tunisia, 2015)
- Commander of the National Order of June 27 (Djibouti, 2025)

== See also ==
- Government Mohamed Ghannouchi
