= Exercise African Lion =

Annual U.S.-Moroccan joint military exercise

- Status: Active
- Genre: Multinational military exercise
- Frequency: Annual
- Locations: Morocco and partner nations (e.g. Ghana, Senegal)
- Years active: 2004–present
- Organized by: United States Africa Command; Royal Moroccan Armed Forces

African Lion is an annual, multinational military exercise co-organized by the United States Africa Command (USAFRICOM) and the Royal Moroccan Armed Forces (FAR). Initiated in 2004, it is considered the largest U.S.-led military exercise on the African continent, encompassing multiple domains including land, air, sea, and cyber operations.

The exercise typically spans multiple countries, including Morocco, Tunisia, Ghana, and Senegal; and brings together thousands of troops from across Africa, North America, Europe, and NATO allies.

== History ==
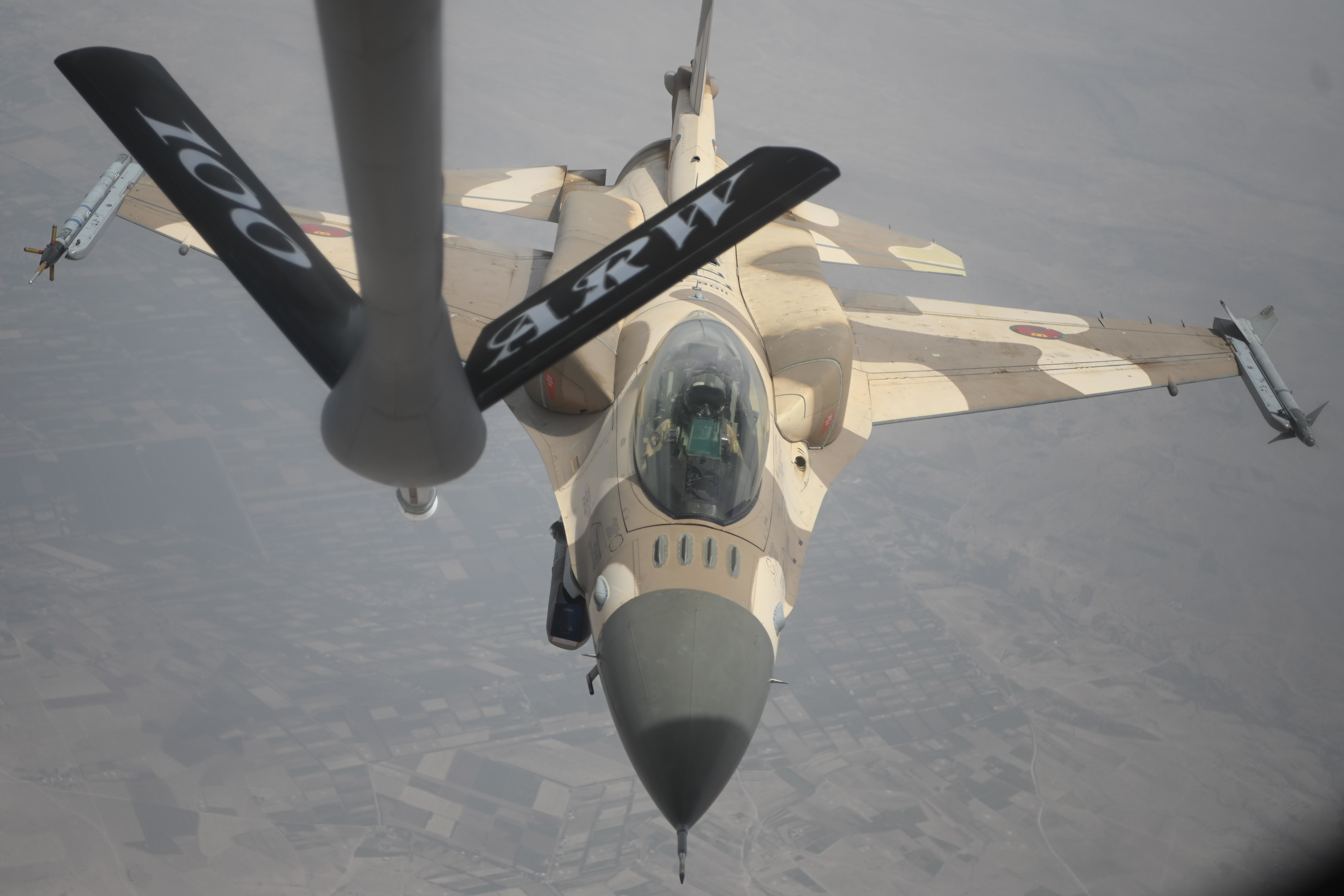
A Royal Moroccan Air Force F-16 refuels from a U.S. Air Force KC-135 during African Lion over Morocco

The African Lion military exercise was first conducted in 2004 as a bilateral training initiative between the United States and Morocco. It was designed to enhance military cooperation, improve interoperability, and support regional security. Initially limited to command post exercises and tactical drills, the exercise has since expanded significantly in scale and complexity.

The exercise is led by the United States Africa Command and co-organized by the Royal Moroccan Armed Forces. It involves coordination across multiple U.S. military branches, including the U.S. Army, U.S. Navy, U.S. Marine Corps, and U.S. Air Force. On the Moroccan side, the exercise includes the Royal Moroccan Army, Royal Moroccan Navy, and Royal Moroccan Air Force.

Over the years, African Lion has evolved into the largest annual joint military exercise on the African continent. Other host nations such as Tunisia, Senegal, and Ghana have periodically hosted components of the training. The number of participants has steadily grown, with recent editions including over 40 countries, such as France, Italy, the United Kingdom, the Netherlands, Brazil, and NATO elements.

The exercises incorporate multi-domain operations, including land, air, maritime, cyber, and space, alongside humanitarian civic assistance (HCA) and disaster response simulations. Training activities have included airborne insertions, live-fire drills, amphibious landings, and medical outreach missions.

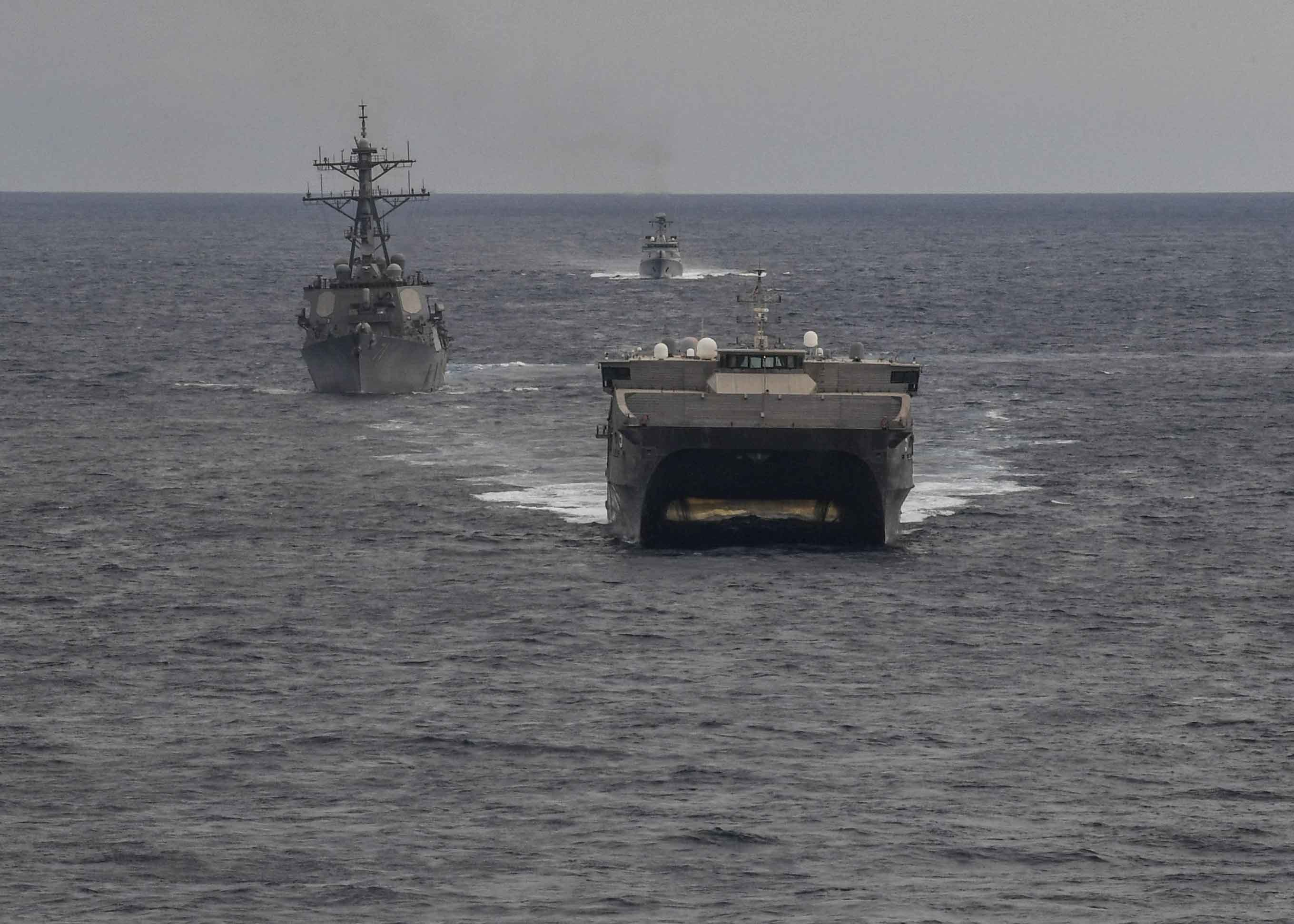
U.S. and Moroccan naval vessels in formation during an exercise in the Atlantic Ocean

Notable leadership figures involved in past iterations have included the commander of USAFRICOM, the Chief of Staff of the Royal Moroccan Armed Forces, and senior officers from participating NATO and partner countries.

African Lion 2021 marked a return to full-scale operations following disruptions caused by the COVID-19 pandemic. The exercise involved more than 7,000 military personnel from nine nations, including the United States, Morocco, Tunisia, and Senegal. Activities took place across multiple sites, and included land, air, and maritime components. Naval operations featured multinational formations and drills conducted in the Atlantic Ocean.

The 2023 and 2024 iterations of African Lion expanded the scope of the exercise by incorporating enhanced cyber defense training and joint logistics planning. These additions reflected a broader focus on multi-domain readiness and interoperability among participating forces.

== Objectives ==
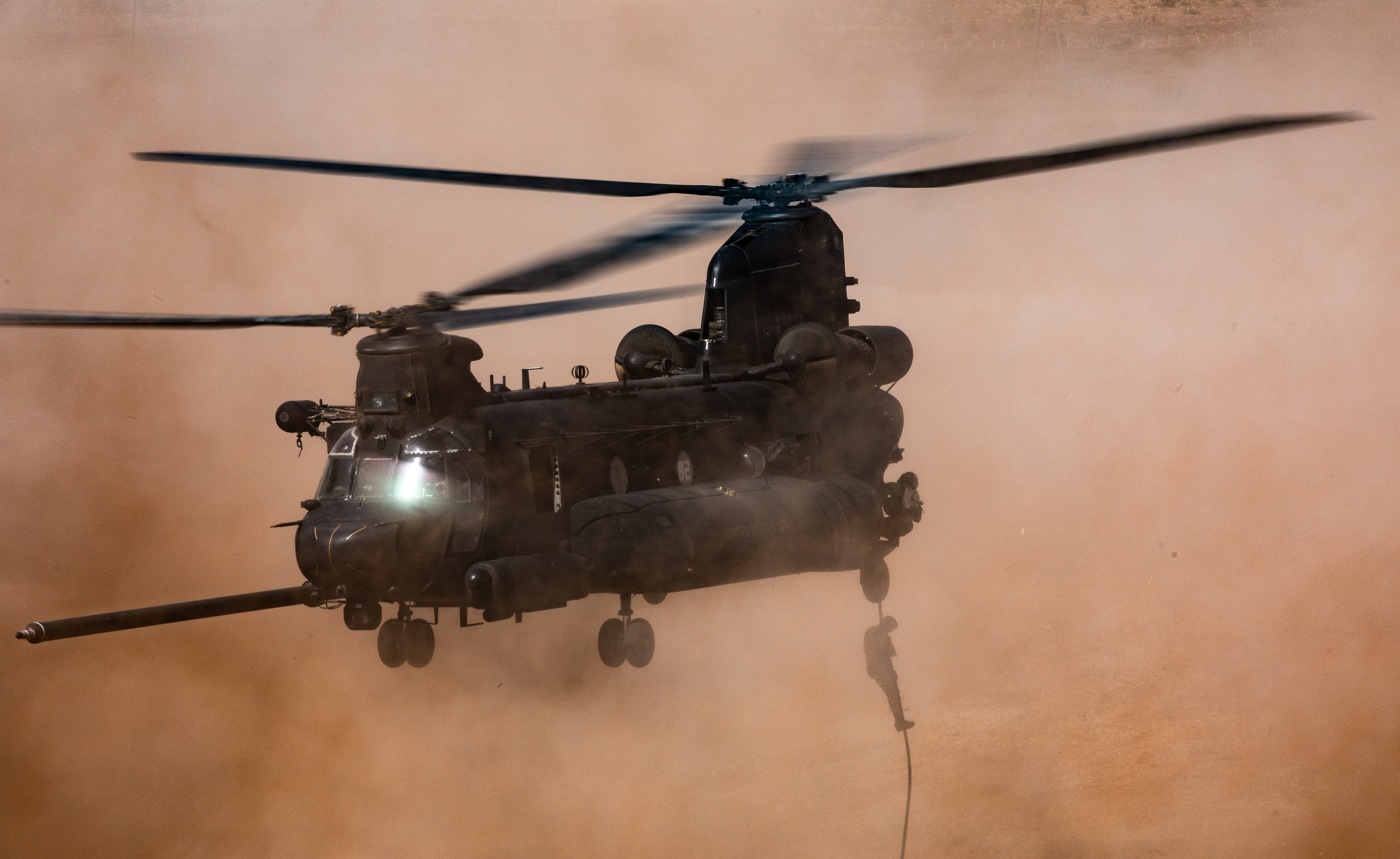
U.S. and Moroccan forces fast-roping from a CH-47 in Tifnit, Morocco during African Lion 2021

The main objectives of the exercise consist of:

- Enhancing interoperability among U.S., Moroccan, NATO, and African partner forces for joint operations and coordination.
- Strengthening rapid deployment and combat readiness across varied terrains and strategic locations in Africa.
- Promoting regional security and stability through collaborative training and intelligence sharing.
- Fostering multinational defense partnerships through large-scale participation of allied and partner nations.
- Simulating real-world operational environments by conducting exercises in deserts, mountains, coastal zones, and urban areas representative of conflict zones in North and West Africa.

== Exercises by year ==
=== African Lion 2013 ===
The exercise was cancelled at the request of the Kingdom of Morocco, which were supposed to take place from April 7 to 27, 2013. This cancellation was in response to Washington's efforts to submit a draft resolution to the UN Security Council to expand the MINURSO mission to include human rights monitoring in Western Sahara. However, the U.S. Embassy in Rabat announced that the maneuvers would partially proceed after changing the draft resolution and abandoning the idea of mentioning human rights. The exercises were planned to involve 1,400 American soldiers and 900 members of the Royal Armed Forces, including peacekeeping amphibious operations, aerial resupply, and low-altitude flight exercises.

=== African Lion 2023 ===
Between May 22 and June 16, 2023, the African Lion 23 exercise took place in various regions of Morocco, including Agadir, Tan-Tan, Benguerir, and Tafraout, notably in the Mahbass area of the desert. Approximately 6,000 soldiers from twenty African and international countries participated, including Morocco and the United States, along with 27 observer countries. The participating military units simulated enemy engagement using combined arms tactics, supported by air units conducting sorties with F16 and B1B aircraft. Ground operations included artillery strikes to clear minefields, allowing engineering units to open passages for assault and counter-assault missions using Abrams tanks accompanied by infantry units.

=== African Lion 2024 ===
The Royal Armed Forces and the United States Armed Forces jointly organized the 20th edition of the African Lion exercise from May 20 to 31, covering Benguerir, Agadir, Tan-Tan, Aqa, and Tafraout. According to a statement from the General Command of the Royal Armed Forces, these extensive maneuvers would involve around 7,000 personnel from approximately twenty countries, including the North Atlantic Treaty Organization (NATO), alongside the Royal Armed Forces and their American counterparts. The activities include joint tactical land, sea, and air exercises, both day and night, special forces training, airborne operations, as well as operational planning exercises for staff officers within the Task Force.
