= Farhat Horchani =

Tunisian politician

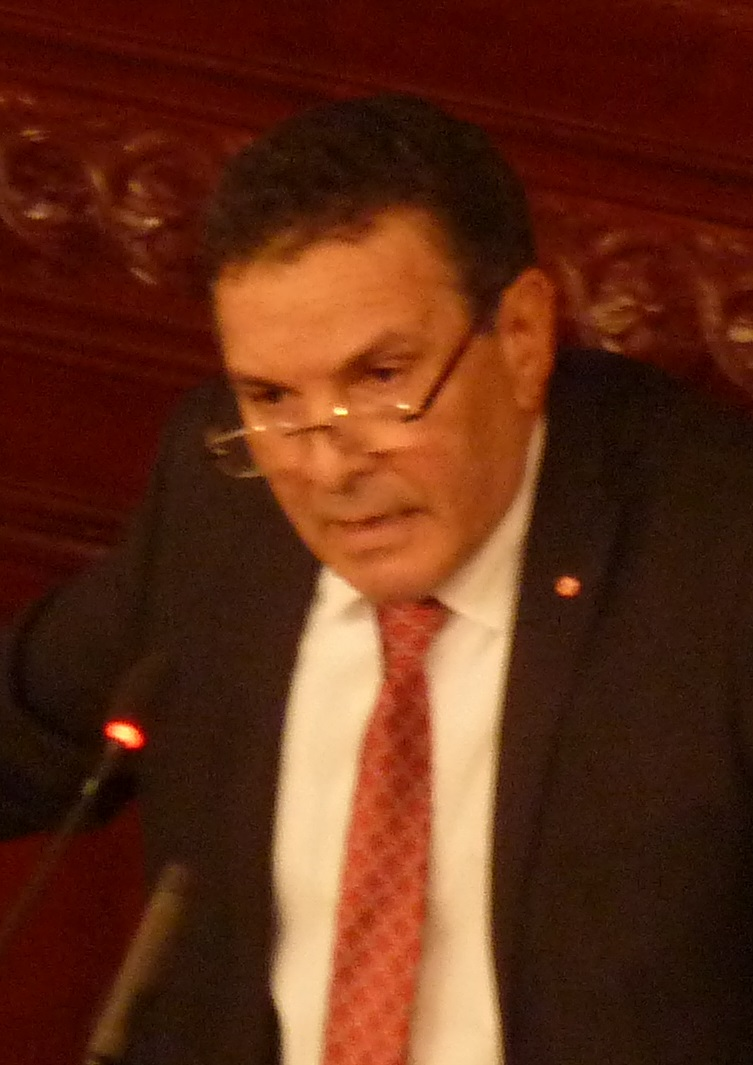

Minister of Defence
- In office 6 February 2015 – 11 September 2017
- Prime Minister: Youssef Chahed
- Preceded by: Ghazi Jeribi
- Succeeded by: Abdelkrim Zbidi

Personal details
- Born: 20 January 1953 (age 73)

Farhat Horchani is a Tunisian politician. He served as Minister of Defence in the cabinet of Prime Minister Youssef Chahed.
