= Hafedh Ben Sala =

Tunisian politician

Personal details
- Born: 28 January 1950 (age 76) Moknine, Tunisia

Hafedh Ben Sala (born 28 January 1950) is a Tunisian politician. He served as Minister of Justice in the cabinet of Prime Minister Mehdi Jomaa.
