= Abdelhamid Escheikh =

- عبد الحميد الشيخ
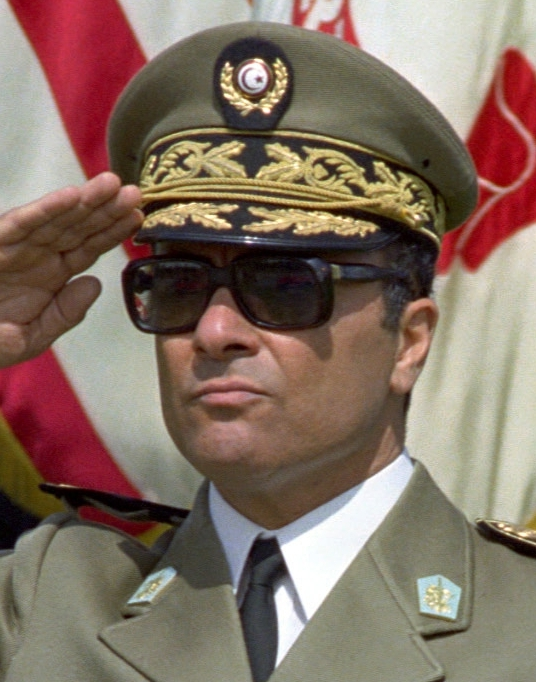
- Abdelhamid Escheikh in 1981

Minister of the Interior
- In office 3 March 1990 – 17 February 1991
- President: Zine El Abidine Ben Ali
- Prime Minister: Hamed Karoui
- Preceded by: Chédli Neffati
- Succeeded by: Abdallah Kallel

Minister of Foreign Affairs
- In office 7 November 1988 – 3 March 1990
- President: Zine El Abidine Ben Ali
- Prime Minister: Hédi Baccouche; Hamed Karoui
- Preceded by: Mahmoud Mestiri
- Succeeded by: Ismaïl Khelil

Minister of Youth and Sports
- In office 12 April 1988 – 27 July 1988
- President: Zine El Abidine Ben Ali
- Prime Minister: Hédi Baccouche
- Preceded by: Fouad Mebazaa
- Succeeded by: Hamouda Ben Slama

President of Tunisian Football Federation
- In office 1975–1976
- Preceded by: Beji Mestiri
- Succeeded by: Slim Aloulou

Personal details
- Born: 10 March 1935 Tunis, Tunisia
- Died: 8 November 1999 (aged 64) Tunis, Tunisia
- Profession: General officer, Diplomat, politician

Abdelhamid Escheikh (10 March 1935 – 8 November 1999), was a General officer, diplomat and Tunisian politician. He served as Chief of Defense Staff in the early 1980s.

== Career ==
=== Military career ===
When Tunisia gained independence in 1956, he began studying law before being sent for training to the Special Military School of Saint-Cyr in France with other executives of the future Tunisian Armed Forces (Bourgiba promotion). He continued his training at the United States Army Command and General Staff College in 1965–1966 and at the Higher War College in 1970–1972.

During the Algerian War, he was sent to the border area to carry out control work. He was also involved in a United Nations peacekeeping mission in Democratic Republic of the Congo in 1960. During the Bizerte crisis, he was appointed to the tactical staff. He subsequently served as military attaché at the Tunisian embassy in France. After his return to Tunisia, he rose through the ranks of the Tunisian Army until becoming Chief of Staff of the Army and then Chief of Staff of the Armed Forces. He was then the youngest senior officer to have been promoted to the highest military rank, that of lieutenant general.

=== Political career ===
Following the congress of the Socialist Destourian Party in 1979, the organization of which was entrusted to the Tunisian Army, he joined diplomacy. He subsequently sat in the governments of Hédi Baccouche and Hamed Karoui where he assumed several responsibilities including those of Minister of Youth and Sports, Minister of Foreign Affairs and Minister of the Interior. Between May 1991 and September 1996, he served as Tunisian ambassador to Khartoum, Algiers, Dakar and Paris.

=== Sporting role ===
In addition to having been a footballer in the youth categories of the Jeunesse sportive métouienne, Abdelhamid Escheikh is president of several sports federations: football, shooting and equestrian sports. He was also responsible for chairing the organizing committee for the 2001 Mediterranean Games held in Tunisia, but died two years before the event following a long illness; the function is then attributed to Habib Ammar.
