= Farhat Rajhi =

Tunisian politician

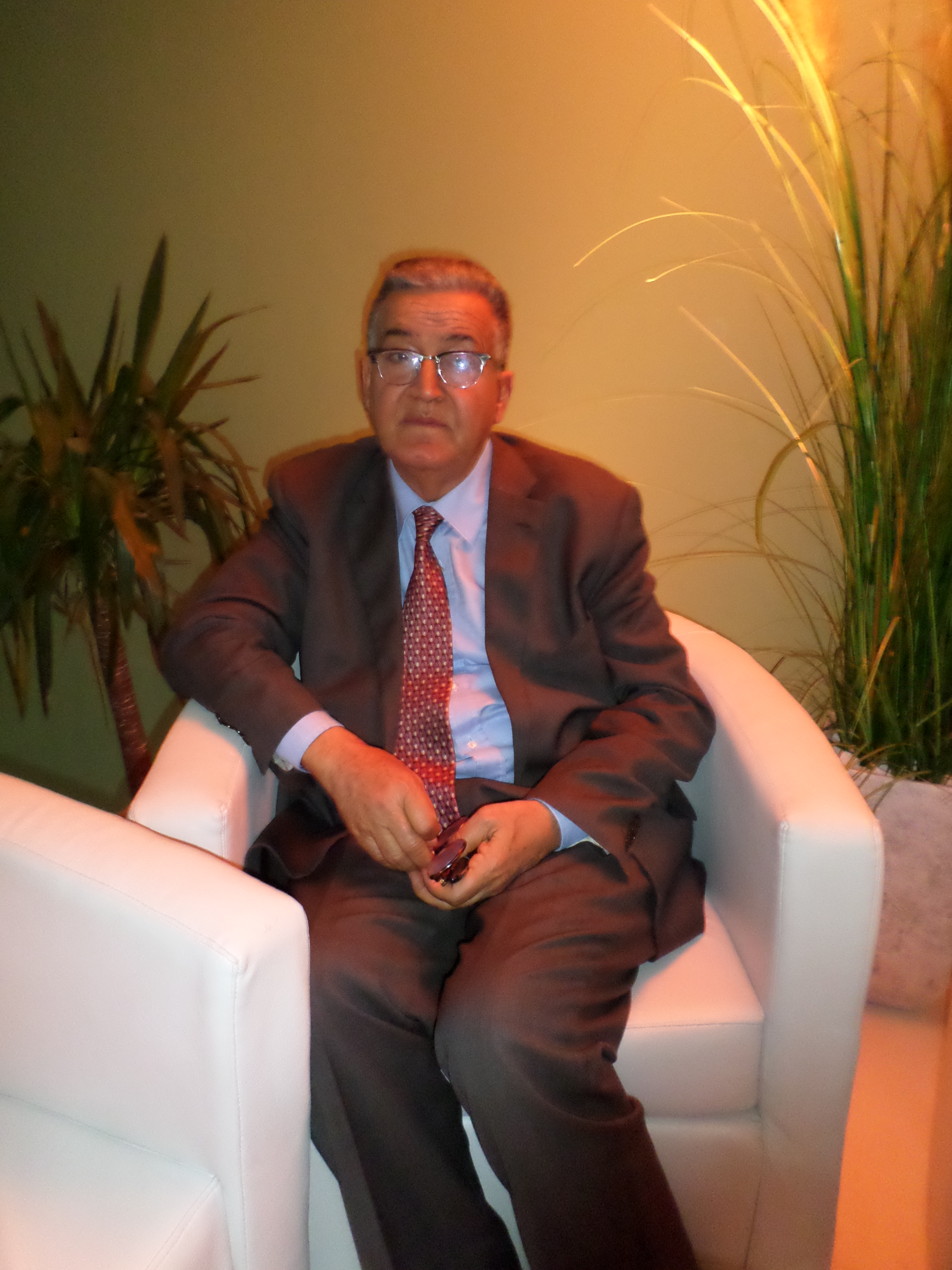
- Farhat Rajhi in 2017

Minister of the Interior
- In office 27 January 2011 – 28 March 2011
- President: Fouad Mebazaa (Acting)
- Prime Minister: Mohamed Ghannouchi; Béji Caïd Essebsi
- Preceded by: Ahmed Friaa
- Succeeded by: Habib Essid

Personal details
- Born: 29 December 1952 (age 73) Tunis, Tunisia
- Party: Independent
- Education: Tunis University

Farhat Rajhi (born 29 December 1952) is a Tunisian politician. He was interim minister of interior affairs between 27 January and 28 March 2011, in the government of Prime Minister Mohamed Ghannouchi.

== Biography ==
After studying at the Faculty of Law of Tunis (license obtained in 1975), he was first judge in the real estate court, then judge in the Cantonal Court of Tunis (appointed in 1983), Deputy Attorney General at the Court of Appeal of Tunis and Vice-President of the Real Estate Court [1]. His career then led him to occupy the positions of President of the Criminal Division of the Court of Appeal of Bizerte, Attorney General of the Court of Appeal of Nabeul, then that of Bizerte. He was also president of the Criminal Division of the Tunis Court of Appeal.

He is then president of the criminal chamber near the court of appeal of Monastir then public prosecutor near the Court of Cassation [1]. He has also been an Inspector of Judicial Services [1]. On 1 June 2011, he was appointed president of the 20th chamber of the Court of Cassation.

Alongside his career as a magistrate, Farhat Rajhi is a professor of criminal procedure at the Higher Institute of the Judiciary and publishes in the magazine Jurisprudence and Legislation.

During the 2011 revolution, he was appointed Minister of the Interior of the second Ghannouchi government. On 31 January, shortly after his appointment, the ministry was invaded by 2 to 3,000 demonstrators, who threatened to put him to death with General Rachid Ammar, He attributes this coup attempt to supporters of the Democratic Constitutional Rally (RCD) and immediately appoints 24 new governors, including five who were not part of the RCD, the party of former President Ben Ali. It also cleans up within the ministry and throughout the police hierarchy, by early retirement 42 senior officials, and announcing the reinstatement of police officers dismissed by injustice. Former Interior Minister Rafik Belhaj Kacem is also arrested on 2 February.

Finally, in order to restore order and fight against violent gangs, the police being absent from the streets for several days, it increases the salaries of executives of the institution.

He remained minister in the government of Beji Caid Essebsi, until his replacement by Habib Essid a month later.

On 31 March, he was appointed head of the High Committee on Human Rights and Fundamental Freedoms.

On 5 May, he creates the buzz with an interview posted on Facebook where he notably treats Prime Minister Caid Essebsi as a "liar", declares that his government is being manipulated by a former close friend of Ben Ali and that the chief of staff armies, General Rachid Ammar, prepares a coup d'état in case the Ennahdha movement wins the elections. The next day, faced with the wave of reactions, including from the government, he apologizes saying he was trapped, arguing that "these were hypotheses, interpretations and mere personal opinions" and justifying his accusations by a "political immaturity" [11]. On 7 May, Acting President Fouad Mebazaa relieved Rajhi of his duties at the High Committee on Human Rights and Fundamental Freedoms.

On 9 May 2015, he joined the Democratic Stream.

== See also ==
- Government Mohamed Ghannouchi
