= Lotfi Ben Jeddou =

Tunisian magistrate and politician

- لطفي بن جدو
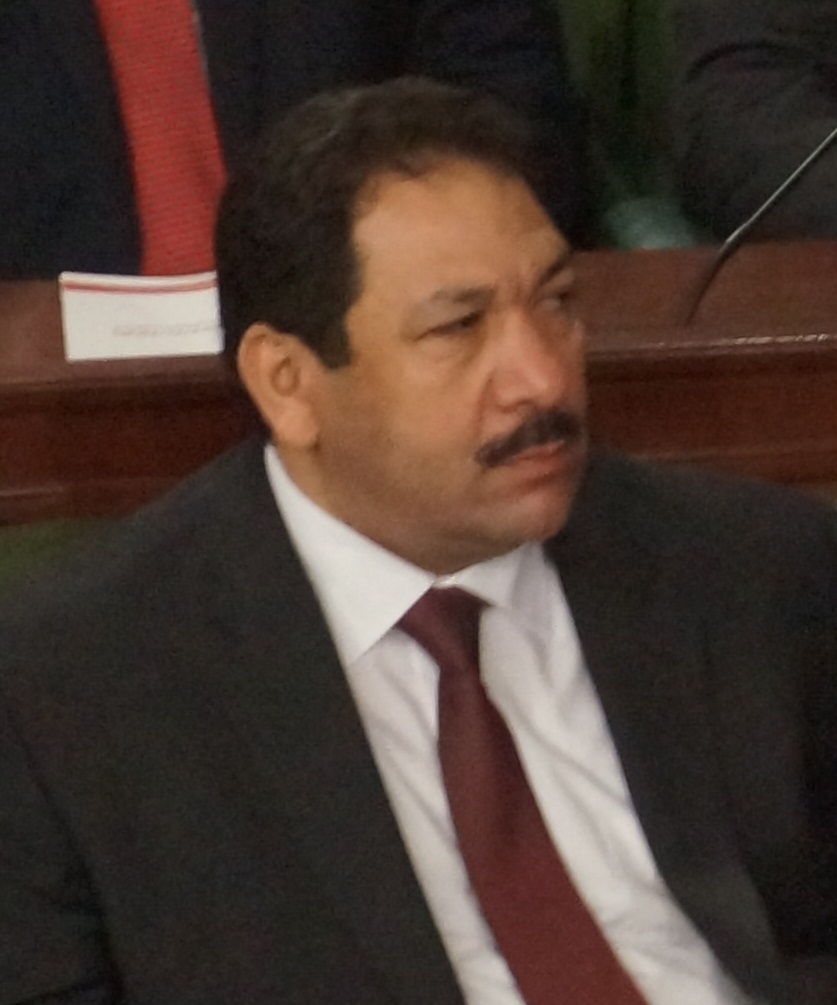

Minister of the Interior
- In office 14 March 2013 – 6 February 2015
- President: Moncef Marzouki
- Prime Minister: Mehdi Jomaa; Ali Laarayedh
- Preceded by: Ali Laarayedh
- Succeeded by: Mohamed Najem Gharsalli

Personal details
- Born: 31 July 1964 (age 61) Sbeitla, Kasserine Governorate
- Party: Independent

Lotfi Ben Jeddou (born 31 July 1964 in Sbeitla) is a Tunisian magistrate who was Minister of the Interior from 14 March 2013 to 6 February 2015. Following the resignation of former Prime Minister Hamadi Jebali, Ali Larayedh was designated as his successor on 8 March 2013 and named his government with Othman Jerandi as foreign minister, Rachid Sabbagh as defense minister, and Lotfi Ben Jeddou as Minister of the Interior. The government was approved by the Constituent Assembly (139–45) on 13 March 2013 and took office on 14 March 2013. He is a member of the Ennahda Movement.

== Biography ==
=== Professional career ===
Lotfi Ben Jeddou was graduated from the Higher Judicial Institute of Tunis and licentiate in law.

=== Interior Minister of Tunisia ===
On 30 July 2013 Lotfi Ben Jeddou told the local Mosaique radio station "I have a great wish to resign, and I am ready to resign. A salvation government or national unity government must be formed to get Tunisia out of this bottleneck."

=== Personal life ===
A group of armed gunmen attacked the house of Ben Jeddou in western region of Kasserine in May 2014. Ben Jeddou was not at his house during the attack. Four policemen were killed and one injured. A court sentenced 31 suspects involved in the deaths to a death sentence in October 2016.
