= Anti-impunity =

Anti-impunity is efforts to use criminal law to punish serious abusers of human rights. Although an anti-impunity norm exists internationally, it is not uncontested.
