= Ridha Grira =

Tunisian politician

Ridha Grira رضا قريرة
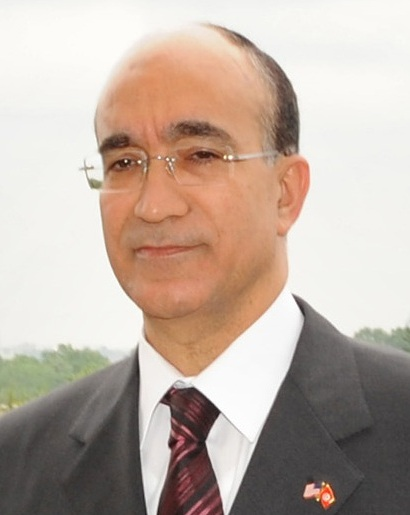
- Ridha Grira

Tunisian Minister of Defense
- In office January 14, 2010 – January 27, 2011
- President: Zine El Abidine Ben Ali
- Prime Minister: Mohamed Ghannouchi
- Preceded by: Kamel Morjane
- Succeeded by: Abdelkrim Zbidi

Tunisian Minister of State Properties and Property Affairs
- In office April 22, 1999 – January 14, 2010
- President: Zine El Abidine Ben Ali
- Prime Minister: Hamed Karoui; Mohamed Ghannouchi
- Succeeded by: Foued Daghfous

Personal details
- Born: August 21, 1955 (age 70) Sousse, Tunisia
- Party: Constitutional Democratic Rally
- Education: École centrale Paris; Université Paris 1 Panthéon-Sorbonne; Institut d'études politiques de Paris; École nationale d'administration

Ridha Grira (born 1955) is a Tunisian politician. He is a former Minister of National Defense.

== Biography ==
Ridha Grira was born on August 21, 1955, in Sousse, Tunisia. He attended the Lycée Louis-le-Grand, and he received an MPhil in Chemical Engineering from the École centrale Paris in 1974. He also studied Law, Economics and Management at the University of Paris 1 Pantheon-Sorbonne and the Institut d'Études Politiques de Paris. He also graduated from the Ecole Nationale d'Administration.

In 1991, he became CEO of the Banque Tuniso-Libyenne. From 1992 to 1999, he worked as General Secretary of the Government. He then worked as Minister of State Properties and the Land Affairs. In January 2010, he became Minister of National Defense. In the aftermath of the 2010–2011 Tunisian protests, he was reappointed by Prime Minister Mohamed Ghannouchi. He sits on the board of the Constitutional Democratic Rally.
