= Humanitarian civic assistance activities =

In the United States Department of Defense, Humanitarian Civic Assistance (HCA) is relief and development activities that take place in the context of an overseas military exercise, training or operation. Under the HCA program, U.S. military personnel participating in overseas deployments carry out humanitarian activities such as road and school construction, vaccination of children and animals, and well-digging. HCA programs are often executed with the involvement of host-country civilian and military personnel. U.S. National Guard or reserve units are involved in many HCA activities.

HCA programs cannot be carried out solely for humanitarian purposes. The deployment's primary purpose must be training of U.S. forces, readiness exercises or military operations. In describing the deployments which HCA accompanies, DoD states that

overseas deployments are an integral aspect of maintaining a forward U.S. military presence, ensuring operational readiness to respond to crises, and preparing National Guard and Reserve Forces to perform their wartime missions. These exercises enhance U.S. military operational readiness by providing unique training opportunities in remote and austere environments. During these deployments, U.S. Forces practice command and control procedures, logistical operations and sustainment over extended distances.

HCA activities are now being described as "a key tool in the war on terrorism." According to DoD, HCA activities

directly support efforts to counter ideological support for terrorism - one of the fundamental elements of our national strategy and security cooperation initiatives. These humanitarian activities are often preventative in nature, focused at the root cause of ideological extremism, and provide access to regions where traditional military-to-military engagement is virtually impossible. They also provide significant training opportunities for U.S. military personnel while also serving the basic economic and social needs of people in the countries supported.

The Humanitarian Mine Action (HMA) program falls within the HCA programs authorized by Section 401 of Title 10, U.S. Code. The HMA program trains host nations in clearing landmines and other explosive remnants of war, while also providing U.S. military personnel with training and readiness-enhancing experiences by giving them "access to geographical areas otherwise not easily available to US forces." The program is directly supervised by the geographic combatant commanders.

The budget for Humanitarian Civic Assistance projects is presented in a yearly Defense Department report. The amounts indicate "incidental expenses" -- the cost of materials, supplies, and some services. The funding listed below does not include costs for transportation, personnel, fuel, or the repair of equipment. Expenses reported as HCA are only those components of a deployment which are directly related to the project at hand. Thus the dollar amounts categorized as "HCA" are very small when compared with the activity's actual expense.
