= Hédi M'henni =

Tunisian politician (1942–2024)

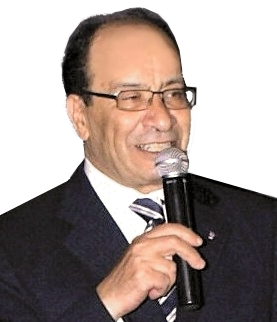
M'henni in 2009

Hédi M'henni (Arabic: الهادي مهني; 24 December 1942 – 9 July 2024) was a Tunisian politician. He served as minister of the interior (2002–2004) and minister of defence (2004–2005). M'henni died on 9 July 2024, at the age of 81.
