= Souk El Jedid =

History of Souk El Jedid

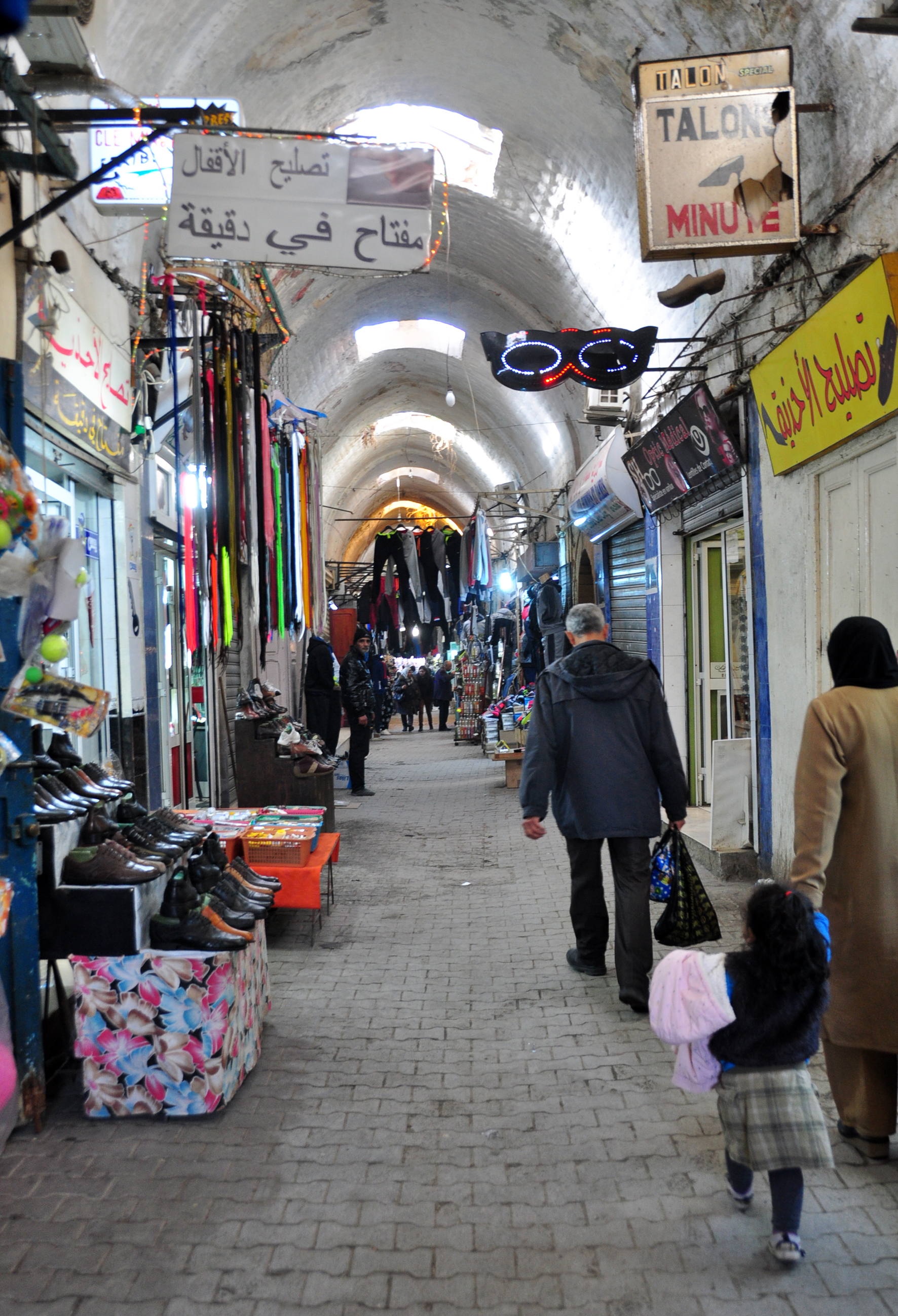
Souk El Jedid

Souk El Jedid is one of the souks in the medina of Tunis.

== Location ==
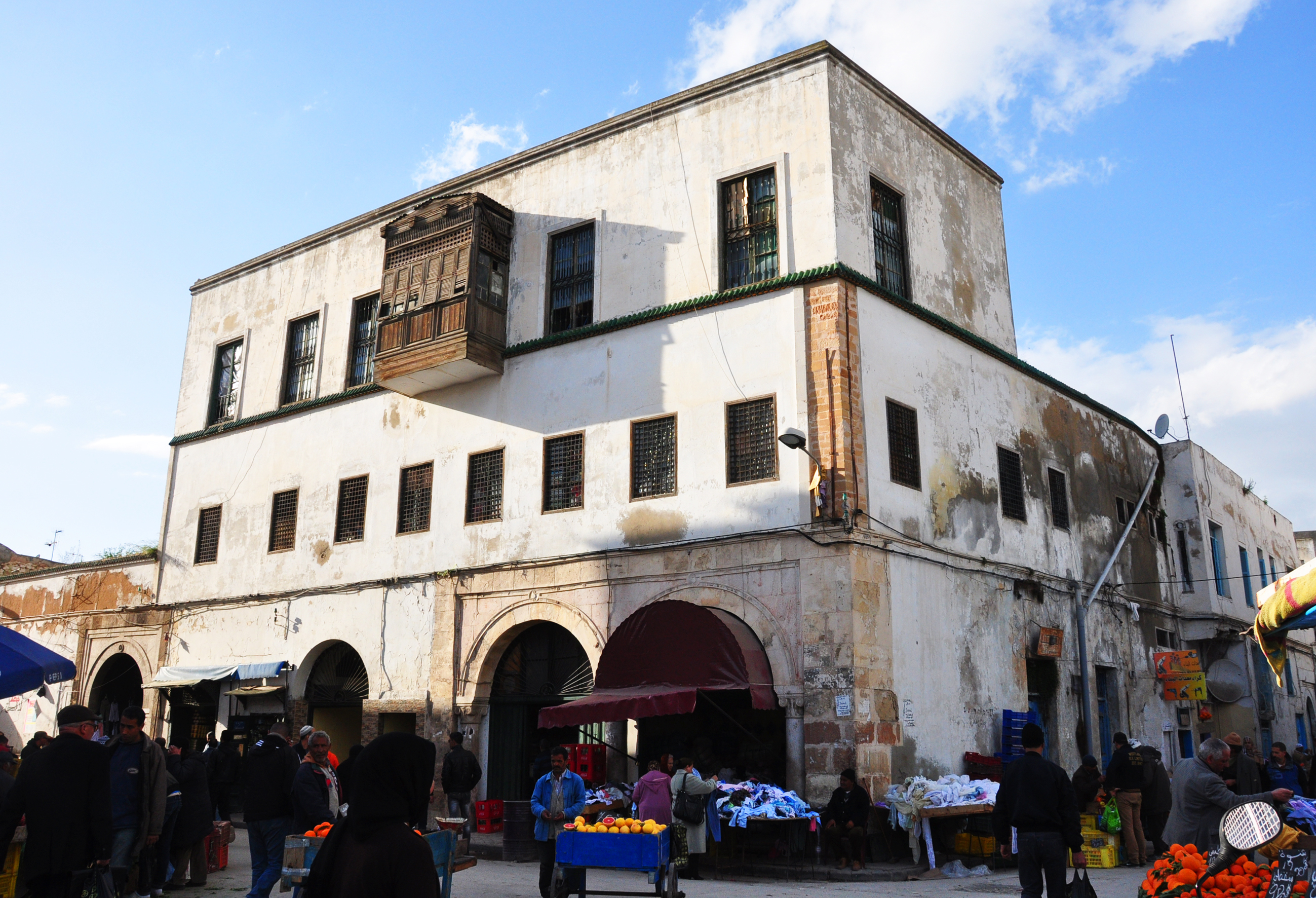
Youssef Saheb Ettabaâ Palace

It is located in the northern suburb of Bab Souika in the Halfaouine district. It links the Sidi Abdessalem Street to the Halfaouine one. The Saheb Ettabaâ mosque is at the entrance of the souk.

== History ==
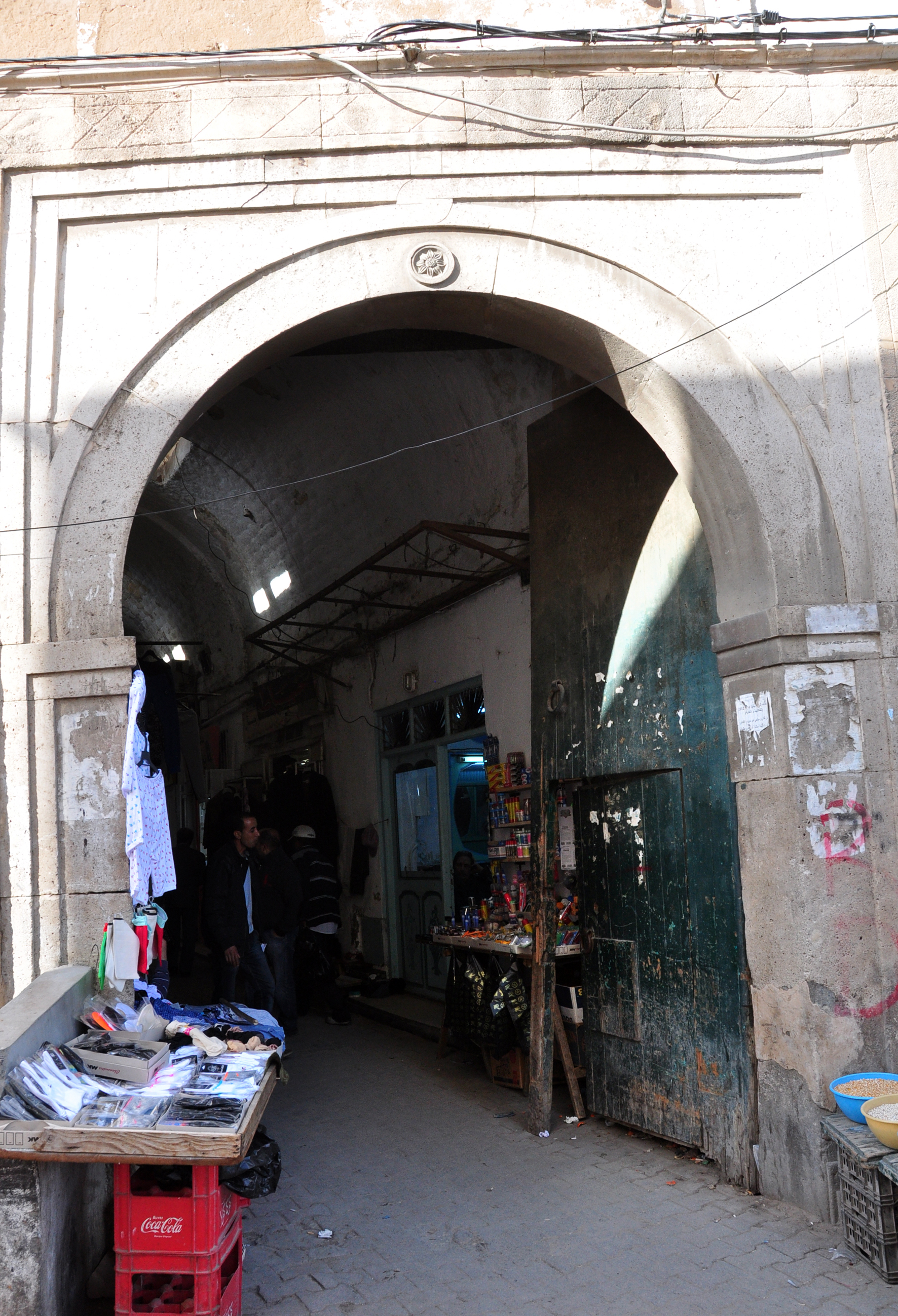
Entrance of the Souk

The souk was founded by Youssef Saheb Ettabaa in the same time as other foundations of Halfaouine district (a mosque, a madrasa, a hammam, a sebil, etc).

== Architecture ==
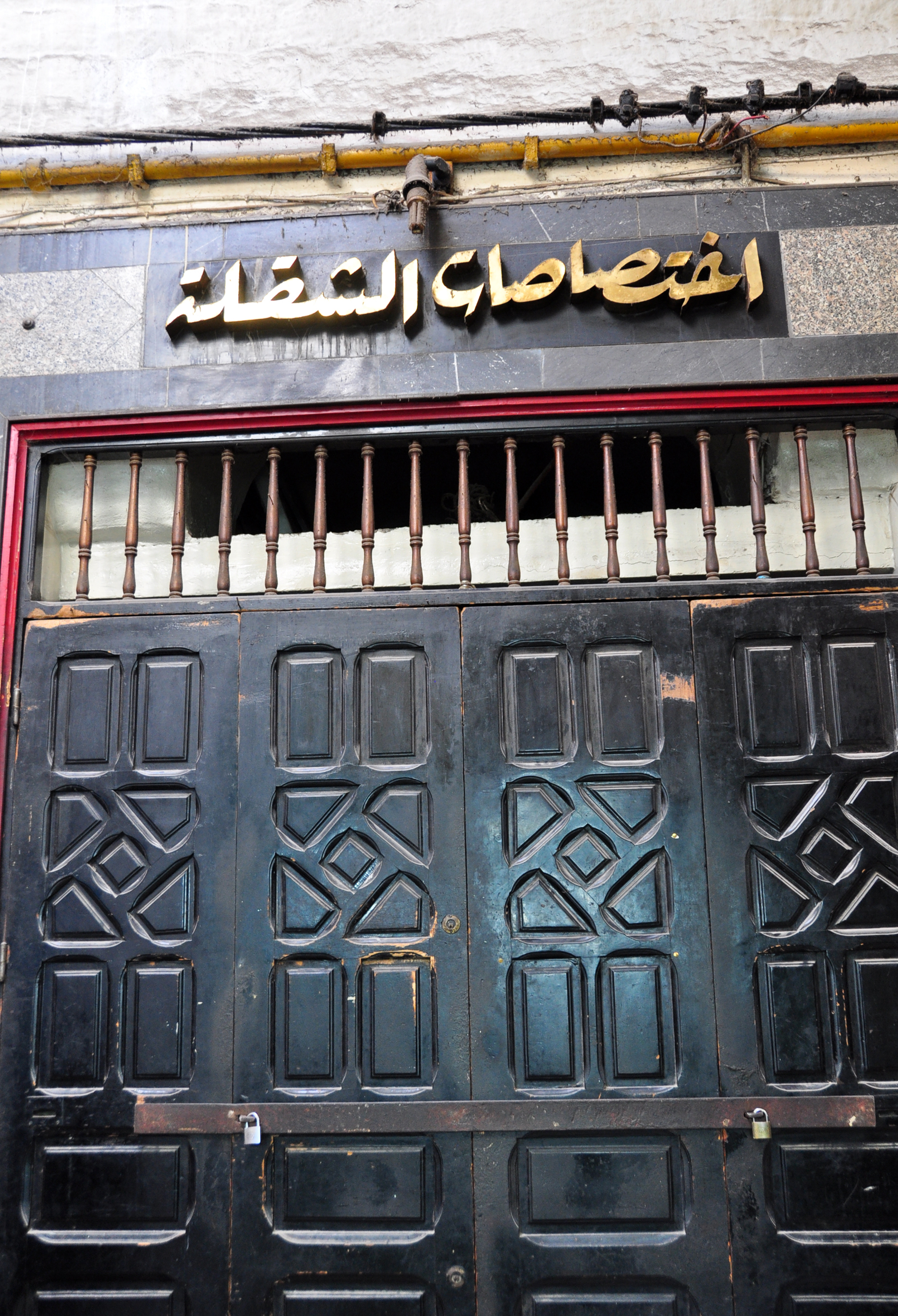
A shop in Souk El Jedid

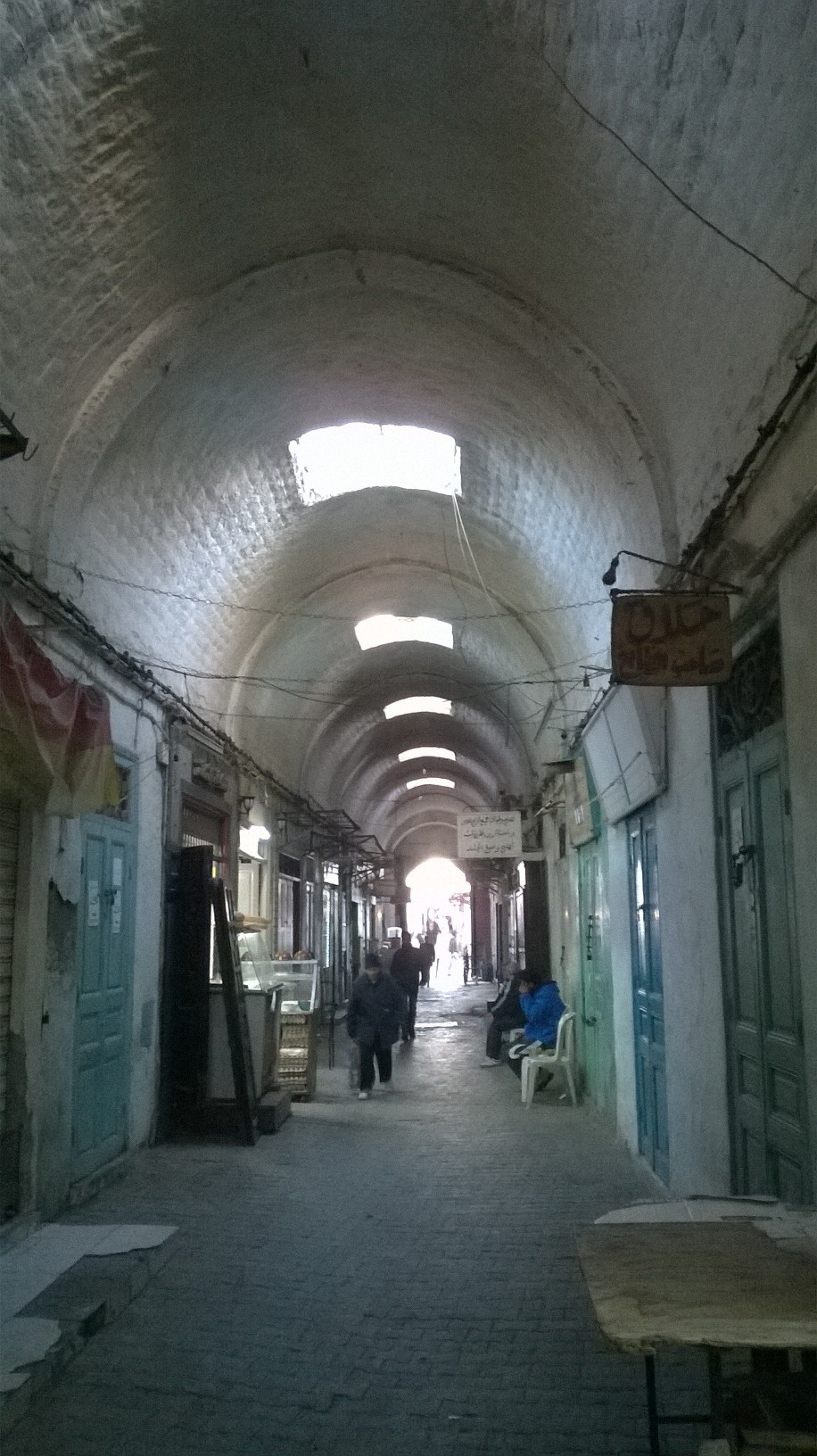
Alley of the Souk

It is 90 meters long and has 53 shops with almost the same size and organised in regular lines. It is covered with barrel vaults. The souk has two main doors: the first one is in front of the Mosque while the second gives access to Sidi El Aloui Street.

== Products ==
Souk El Jedid is considered as the local market of the suburb. That's why shops can easily change their speciality and sell different kinds of products in order to satisfy the needs of the community (food, tissues, etc).
