= Unité Spéciale – Garde Nationale =

Unité Spéciale de la Garde Nationale
- Active: 1980–present
- Country: Tunisia
- Branch: National Guard
- Type: Police tactical unit
- Role: Counter-terrorism; Law enforcement
- Garrison/HQ: Bir Bouregba, Nabeul Governorate, Tunisia
- Nickname(s): USGN

Commanders
- Current commander: Col. Gharbi Houssine

The National Guard Special Unit, commonly abbreviated USGN (French: Unité Spéciale de la Garde Nationale), is the police tactical unit of the Tunisian National Guard. USGN is trained to rescue citizens and allies who are held by a hostile force domestically or foreign, either criminal or terrorist.

USGN’s purpose is to serve as the Tunisian governments premier counter-terrorism unit, offering a tactical resolution option in hostage and high-risk law enforcement situations. USGN functions as a national tactical team in highly sensitive or dangerous situations.

== History ==
This 50 man force was established in the early 1980s and is broken down into two operational sections and a headquarters element. Based in Hammamet, they have responsibility for counter-terrorism operations at government and diplomatic buildings, aircraft hijackings and maritime situations. In the event of a major operation, the U.S.G.N. would be reinforced by the Commandos Unit of the Garde National (National Guard's Commando Unit- U.C.G.N.).

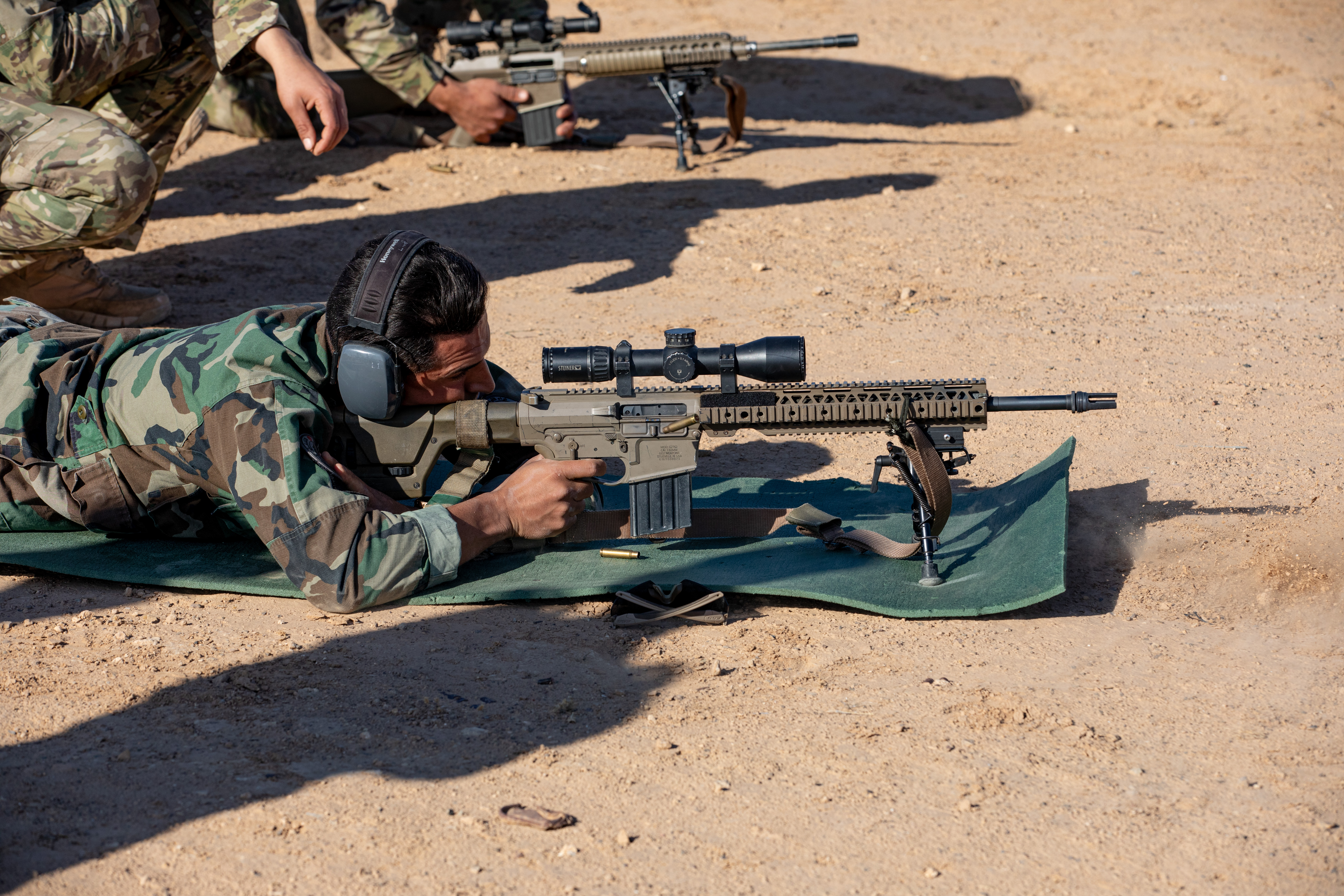
Tunisian USGN operator aiming his M110A2 SASS semi automatic rifle in African Lion 2025 exercise.
