= Hatem Ben Salem =

Tunisian politician

Mohamed Hatem Ben Salem
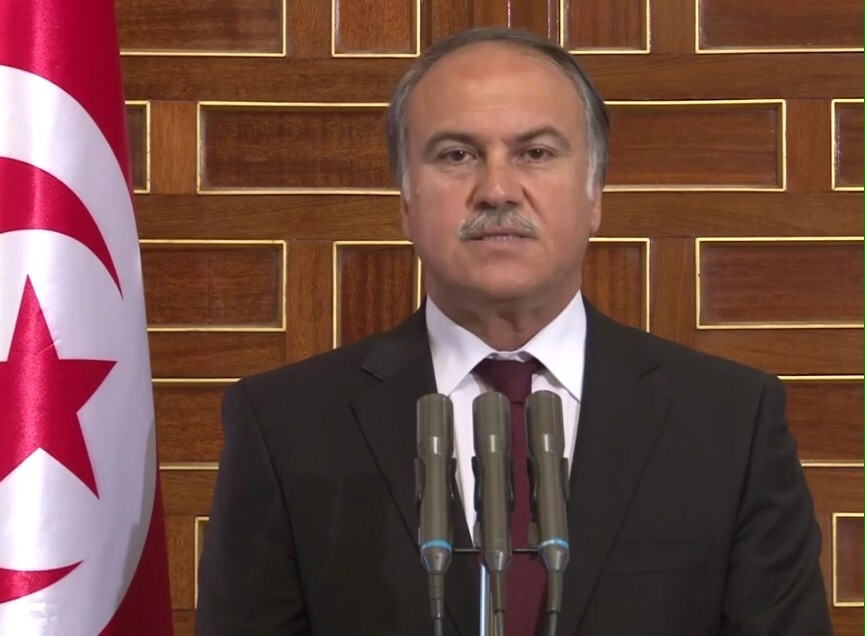

Tunisian Minister of Education
- In office 12 September 2017 – 27 February 2020
- In office 29 August 2008 – 14 January 2011

Personal details
- Born: 8 February 1956 (age 70) Tunisia
- Education: University of Paris

Mohamed Hatem Ben Salem is a Tunisian politician. He was the Minister of Education under former President Zine El Abidine Ben Ali.

== Biography ==
Hatem Ben Salem was born on 8 February 1956. He received a PhD in Law from the University of Paris and the agrégation from the Tunis University.

From 1996 to 2000, he was the Tunisian Ambassador to Senegal, then Guinea, Gambia, Cap Vert, Turkey, and then to the United Nations in Geneva.

He is a member of the International Institute for Strategic Studies in London and the International Institute of Human Rights in Strasbourg. He has taught at Lund University in Sweden and the University of Graz in Austria. In 2008, he was appointed as Minister of Education, until he was deposed in the aftermath of the 2010–2011 Tunisian protests. On 6 July 2015, Ben Salem was appointed as Director of the Tunisian Institute for Strategic Studies. In 2017, Hatem Ben Salem was appointed for the second time as Minister of Education of the Republic of Tunisia.
