= Rafiq Belhaj Kacem =

Tunisian politician

Rafiq Belhaj Kacem (born 6 April 1949 in Béja, Tunisia) is a Tunisian politician. He was the Minister of the Interior under former President Zine El Abidine Ben Ali. During the 2010–2011 Tunisian protests, he was fired by former President Ben Ali.

== Biography ==
He did his primary and secondary studies in his hometown of Beja. After obtaining his bachelor's degree in 1968, he enrolled at the University of Tunis where he obtained a degree in literature in 1972, then a complementary degree in philosophy in 1973.

After teaching at a high school in Beja, he was appointed in 1980 as director of the North West Development Office, a position he held for seven years. From 1987 to 1988, he served as governor of Kairouan. In 1991, he was appointed Secretary of State to the Minister of the Interior in charge of Regional and Municipal Cities; it modernises the management of municipalities, contributes to regional development and introduces the first program that makes environmental concerns mandatory. In recognition of the work accomplished, he was appointed in February 1995 as first adviser to the President of the Republic, then in 2002 as minister-adviser to the President of the Republic for political affairs. He succeeds Hédi M'henni on 11 November 2004 as Minister of the Interior and Local Development. He was briefly assisted in early 2011 by Secretary of State Mongi Chouchane.

Following the 2011 Tunisian revolution, which is progressively spreading across the country, Prime Minister Mohamed Ghannouchi announces his dismissal on January 12, 2011; Ahmed Friaâ replaces him.

He was Secretary General of the Béja Coordinating Committee in the 1980s. A member of the Political Bureau of the Democratic Constitutional Rally, he was re-elected as a member of its Central Committee at the party congress held in July 2008. He is removed from the party on January 18, 2011.

Placed under house arrest, he was arrested for "answering serious suspicions that weighed on him" fifteen days after his dismissal and imprisoned in Mornaguia prison [1]. Without legal proceedings, some of his legally acquired property is confiscated and his wife is deprived of her retirement pension.

On June 13, 2012, he obtained a dismissal by the military court of Kef for his role in the crackdown of January 2011 in Thala and Kasserine. On July 19, the military court of Tunis sentenced him to fifteen years in prison in the largest trial of the martyrs and wounded of the revolution, those of greater Tunis and five other governorates, sentence brought back on appeal to three years of prison on April 12, 2014. On April 30, 2013, he was sentenced to ten years in prison for intentional homicide and attempted murder in the case of a martyr and two wounded in the governorate of Sfax. On May 8, 2014, he was released and hospitalized in a clinic in Tunis.

On November 20, 2015, he was sentenced to two years in prison in a case of extortion of money.
