= Ghazi Jeribi =

Tunisian politician

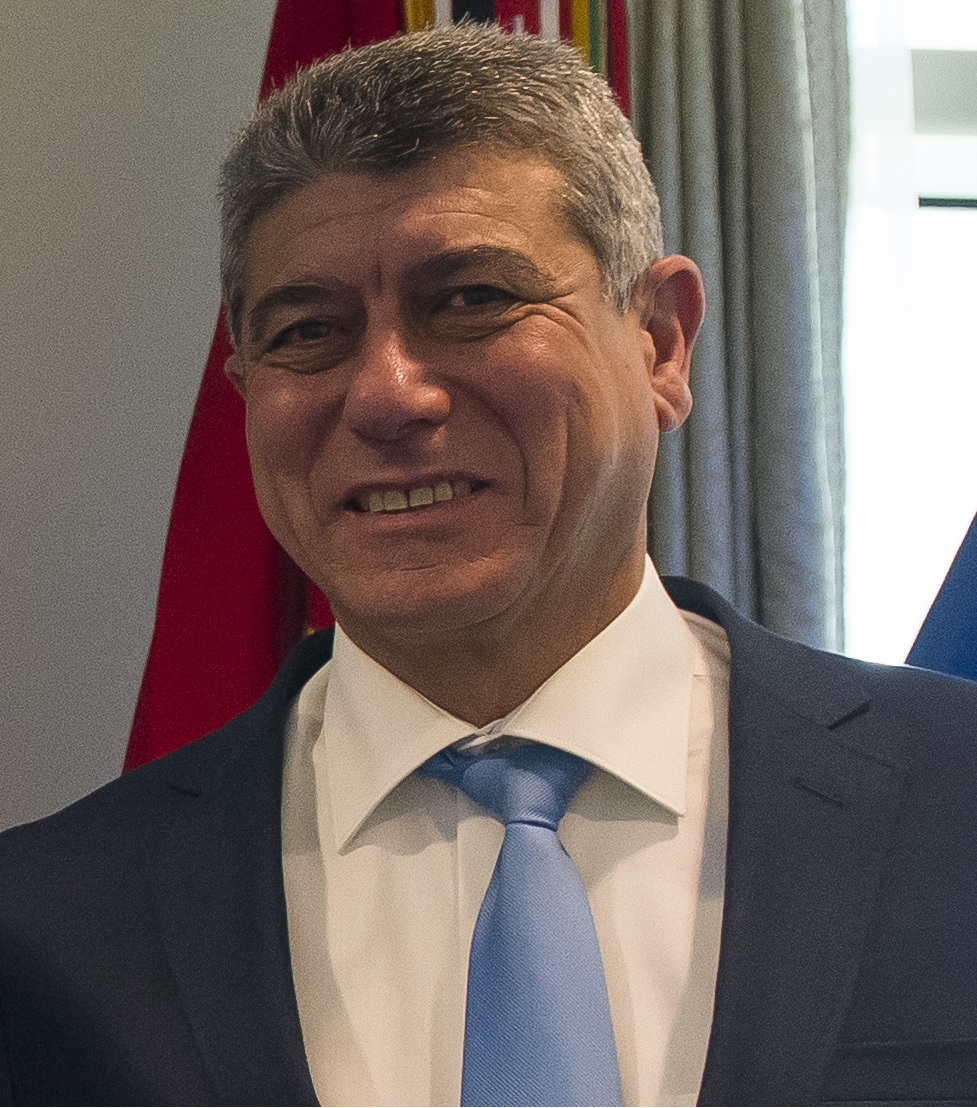

Ghazi Jeribi is a Tunisian politician. He served as Minister of Defence in the cabinet of Prime Minister Mehdi Jomaa. He also served as Minister of Justice in the cabinet of Prime Minister Youssef Chahed.
