= Rachid Sabbagh =

Tunisian politician (died 2026)

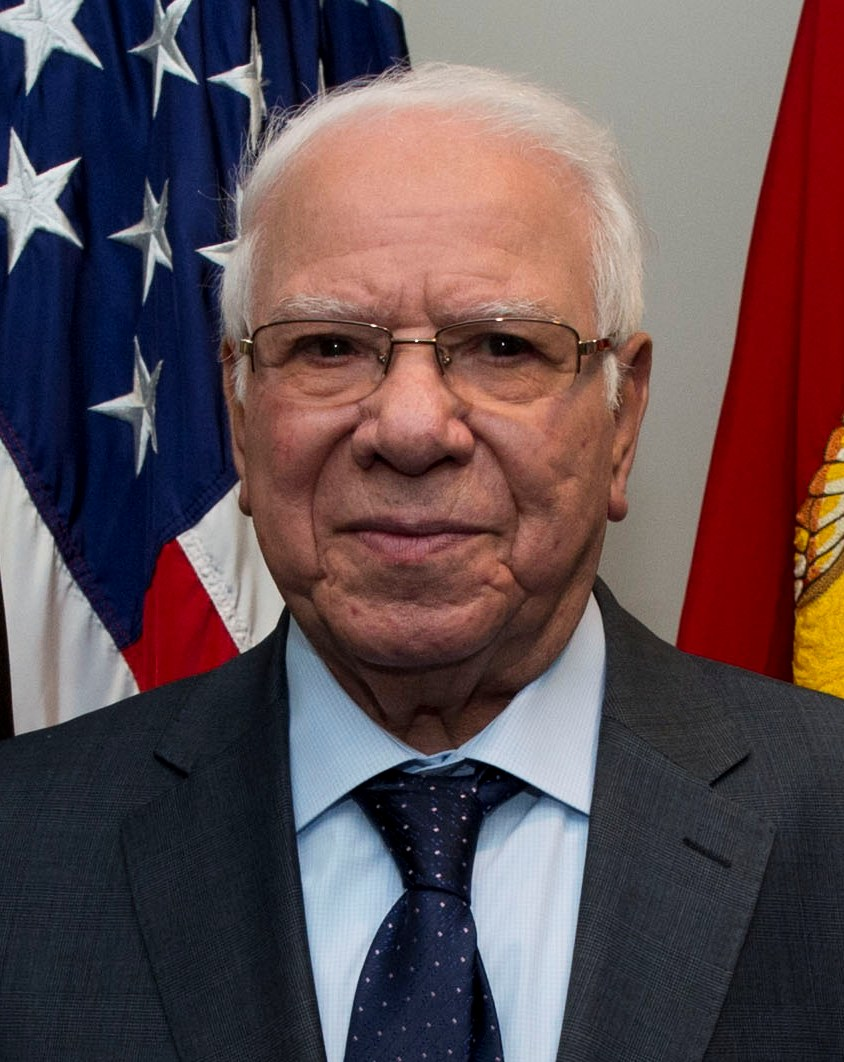
Tunisian minister Rachid Sabbagh

Rachid Sabbagh (Arabic: رشيد الصباغ; died 15 September 2026) was a Tunisian independent politician who joined the Ali Laarayedh cabinet in 2013 as defense minister. He died on 15 September 2026.
