= Mohamed Jegham =

Tunisian politician and businessman

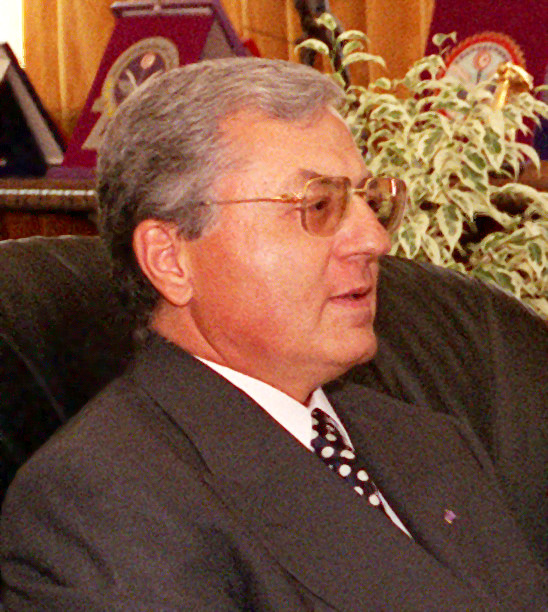
Mohamed Jegham

Mohamed Jegham (Tunisian Arabic: محمد جغام), (born August 8, 1943 in Hammam Sousse), is a Tunisian politician and businessman.

== Biography ==
=== Youth ===
Mohamed Jegham's father died when he was two and mother died when he was an adult.

After studies in Sousse and Tunis, he graduated in economics from the Ecole Nationale d'Administration.

=== Official and businessman ===
At the age of 25, he joined the Interior Ministry. Jegham was successively appointed delegate to Beja, Gafsa and Jendouba, the first delegate of the Delegation of South Tunis, secretary general of the governorate of Bizerte and finally Governor of Gabes.

Appointed Chief Executive Officer (CEO) of the mechanical workshops of the Sahel in 1980, Jegham then became CEO of the Society for the Study and Development of North Sousse in 1983. In 1988 he was appointed Managing Director of Regional Affairs in the Ministry of the Interior.

He has worked since 2005 for General Mediterranean Holdings.

=== Politician ===
He entered the government on July 26, 1988 as Minister of Tourism and Handicrafts. On January 20, 1995, he was appointed interior minister, succeeding Abdullah Kallel. On January 20, 1997, he was appointed Minister-Director of the Office of the President and, November 17, 1999, Minister of National Defence, a position he held for fourteen months. He left the government January 23, 2001 to be appointed ambassador to Rome on March 30.

Mohamed Jegham joined the central committee of the Constitutional Democratic Rally in 1988 at the Congress of Salut, his mandate was renewed in 1993 and 1999 and until Congress of Ambition held in 2003. He was a member of the Political Bureau from January 25, 1995 to January 26, 2001.

He was also Member of Parliament for Sousse during the Ninth and Tenth Legislatures from 1994 to 2004. He also holds the office of mayor of Hammam Sousse.

He was appointed January 17, 2011 as Minister of Commerce and Tourism in the "unity government" led by Mohamed Ghannouchi, after the flight of former President Zine el-Abidine Ben Ali during the Tunisian revolution. He was replaced ten days later by Mehdi Houas because of his political ties with the RCD and having been part of the government of Ben Ali. He announced on February 19 that he founded a new party called the Homeland Party. Slim Chaker is his secretary of state.

== Private life ==
Mohamed Jegham is married with whom he has three children.
