= Ali Laarayedh =

Tunisian politician (born 1955)

His Excellency Ali Laarayedh
- علي العريّض
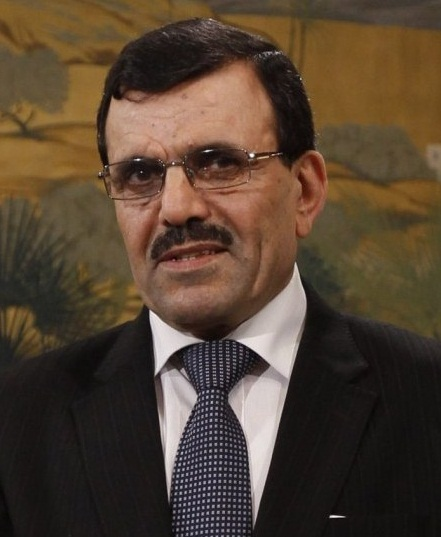
- Laarayedh in 2014

Prime Minister of Tunisia
- In office 13 March 2013 – 29 January 2014
- President: Moncef Marzouki
- Preceded by: Hamadi Jebali
- Succeeded by: Mehdi Jomaa

Minister of the Interior
- In office 24 December 2011 – 13 March 2013
- Prime Minister: Hamadi Jebali
- Preceded by: Habib Essid
- Succeeded by: Lotfi Ben Jeddou

Personal details
- Born: 15 August 1955 (age 71) Medenine, Tunisia
- Party: Ennahda Movement
- Spouse: Widad Larayedh
- Children: 3
- Website: t.me/alilaarayedhbot

Ali Laarayedh (Tunisian Arabic: علي العريّض, ʿAlī el-ʿArayiḍ; born 15 August 1955) is a Tunisian politician who was prime minister of Tunisia from 2013 to 2014. Previously he served in the government as the Minister of the Interior from 2011 to 2013. Following the resignation of Prime Minister Hamadi Jebali, Laarayedh was designated as prime minister in February 2013 and elected on 13 March 2013. He is a member of the Ennahda Movement.

== Early life ==
Laarayedh was born in Medenine in 1955.

== Political activism ==
Laarayedh was the spokesperson for the Ennahda Movement from 1981 until his arrest in 1990. After he was harassed by the police under President Habib Bourguiba, he was sentenced to fifteen years in prison under President Zine El Abidine Ben Ali, during which time he suffered torture. He was, among other techniques, threatened with HIV transfusion. His wife, Wided Lagha, was sexually abused and videotaped by officials from the Ministry of Interior.

== Career ==
On 20 December 2011, after President Ben Ali was deposed, he joined the Jebali Cabinet as Minister of the Interior. He vowed to support peace in Tunisia, rejecting religious extremism, tribalism or regionalism. On 22 February 2013, Laarayedh was appointed prime minister after Hamadi Jebali resigned from office. Laarayedh in turn resigned on 9 January 2014.

After being detained for some hours on 19 September 2022, Laarayedh was arrested on 19 December 2022 on accusations alongside others of facilitating the departure of Tunisians to fight with armed rebel groups in the Syrian conflict. On 2 May 2025, he was sentenced to 34 years' imprisonment over the charges. On 27 February 2026, his sentence was reduced to 24 years in prison, while seven co-defendants, including former interior ministry officials, received prison terms ranging from three to 24 years.

== Personal life ==
Laarayedh is married and has three children. His wife is a medical technician.

Political offices
Preceded by Habib Essid	Minister of the Interior; 2011–2013	Succeeded by Lotfi Ben Jeddou
Preceded by Hamadi Jebali	Prime Minister of Tunisia; 2013–2014	Succeeded by Mehdi Jomaa
Party political offices
Preceded by Hamadi Jebali	Secretary General of the Ennahda Movement; 2013–present	Incumbent
