= Driss Guiga =

Tunisian lawyer and politician (1924–2026)

- إدريس قيقة
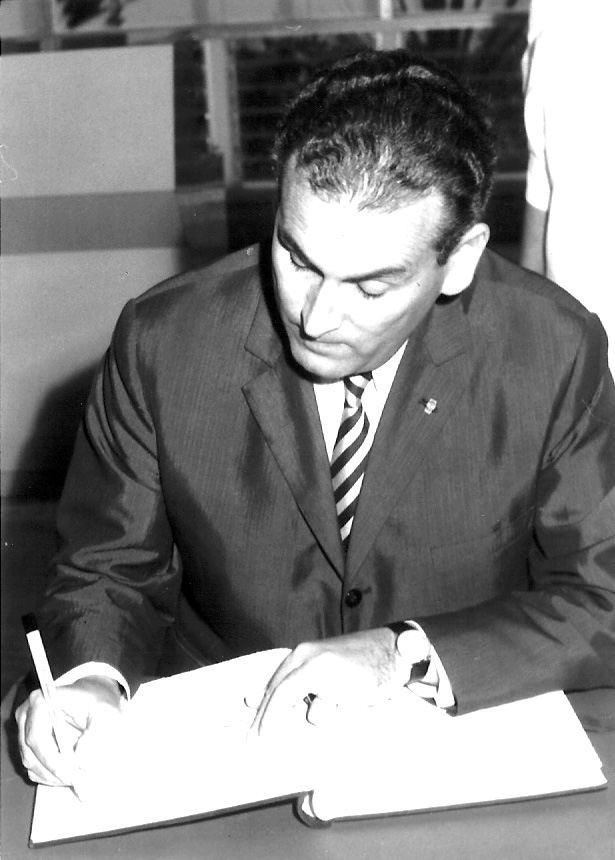
- Guiga in the 1970s
- Born: 21 October 1924; Testour, French Tunisia
- Died: 19 April 2026 (aged 101)
- Occupation: Politician
- Known for: Minister of the Interior

Driss Guiga (Arabic: إدريس قيقة; 21 October 1924 – 19 April 2026) was a Tunisian lawyer and politician who was Minister of Health, Minister of Education, and then Minister of the Interior for four years during the later part of the Habib Bourguiba regime.

== Early years ==
Driss Guiga was born on 21 October 1924. His birthplace was Testour, a village in the northwest of Tunisia where his father was a teacher. He joined the national movement when he was 14 and was a student at Sadiki College in Tunis. The French colonial authorities arrested his teacher, Ali Belhaouane, on 8 April 1938. Belhaouane was responsible for the youth organization of the Neo Destour nationalist party, which had been founded four years earlier. A general strike followed, and the college was closed for two months. Guiga joined a secret cell of the party, met Habib Bourguiba and became a "bourguibiste."

Guiga studied law and history at the University of Algiers (1944–47), where he met his future wife Chacha, a painter. They would have four children. He then enrolled at the Law Faculty of Paris, where he obtained a diploma in civil law in 1949. After returning to Tunis he joined the firm of his uncle, Bahri Guiga, a lawyer and politician. He practiced Law from 1948 to 1952. He also wrote for the journal Mission created by Hedi Amara Nouira. He was arrested in 1952 and spent seven months in prison. In 1952 Guiga was appointed Head of the Office of the Minister of Public Health.

== Political career ==
After Tunisia became independent in 1956 Guiga was appointed in turn secretary general of the National Assembly, head of Regional Government, and General Director of Security at the Interior Ministry. He left the last position after the plot against the former president in 1962, which his service did not foresee. From 1963 to 1969 he was General Commissioner of Tourism. He was State Secretary for Public Health and Social Affairs in 1969, then Minister of Public Health (1969). Guiga was appointed Minister of Education in 1973 after the general strike against the Arabization program advocated by Mohammed Mzali. He succeeded Mzali as Minister of Education in March 1973. He was uninterested in reform, saying in a press interview that the more important task was to stabilize and control the education system. The goal of providing universal primary education had been abandoned by October 1973, and the emphasis was now on improving quality. Guiga wanted to increase the number of teachers, introduce common standards, and define career paths for teachers.

In 1976 Guiga was appointed Tunisian ambassador in Bonn. This was a demotion due to his drive for university decentralization, which was opposed by Prime Minister Nouira. In January 1980 he was named Minister of the Interior through the influence of President Bourguiba's wife, Wassila, shortly before Nouira left office. His career was ended by the Tunisian bread riots of December 1983 – January 1984, after which Bourguiba demanded his resignation. Guiga was blamed for the ruthless way in which the disturbances had been suppressed. He left Tunisia soon after the riots ended and moved to London. In an official report issued in April 1984 he was accused of using the violence to advance his political career. According to opposition members Guiga was just a scapegoat for the riots, which had been caused by a jump in the price of bread. He was tried by the High Court on a charge of treason and was sentenced in absentia to ten years in prison.

== Later life and death ==
As an exile in London, Guiga worked for the Saudi businessman Chamseddine el-Fassi, president of a foundation that promoted Sufism. He returned to Tunis on 8 November 1987 immediately after Bourguiba was deposed. He spent 13 days in prison, then was given a five-year suspended jail sentence and was released.

As of 2005 he was living in retirement in the Hammamet seaside resort about 60 kilometres (37 mi) from Tunis. He had been decorated with the Grand Cordon of the Order of the Tunisian Republic and made Commander of the Order of Tunisian Independence.

Guiga died on 19 April 2026, at the age of 101.

== Sources ==
- Allman, James (1979). Social Mobility, Education and Development in Tunisia. Brill Archive. ISBN 90-04-05875-3.
- Guay, Jean-Herman (2015). "29 décembre 1983: Déclenchement des émeutes du pain en Tunisie". Perspective Monde.
- Kéfi, Ridha (18 April 2005). "Driss Guiga". Jeune Afrique (in French).
- Messiant, Christine (2004). Premières dames en Afrique. KARTHALA Editions. ISBN 978-2-84586-578-5.
- Publitec (1 January 2007). "DRISS (Guiga, M.)". Who's Who in the Arab World 2007-2008. Walter de Gruyter. ISBN 978-3-11-093004-7.
- "Tunisia Report Places Blame for Bread Riots". New York Times. Reuters. 23 April 1984.
- Siino, François (2004). Science et pouvoir dans la Tunisie contemporaine. KARTHALA Editions. ISBN 978-2-84586-550-1.
