= Abdallah Farhat =

Tunisian politician (1914–1985)

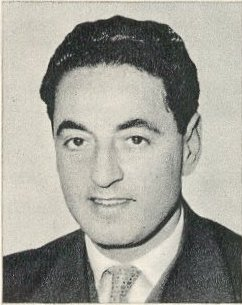
Abdullah Farhat

Abdullah Farhat (28 August 1914 – 29 September 1985) was a Tunisian politician.

== Biography ==
Originally from Ouerdanine in the governorate of Monastir, he first occupied the post of Minister of PTT from September 20 to October 1, 1957. He later became Minister of Transport and Telecommunications (November 12, 1964- September 8, 1969) then Minister of Agriculture (until 29 October 1971). During his appointment as President of the Cabinet of President Habib Bourguiba, in March 1972, the creation of a vice-president position was approved by the Political Bureau of the Socialist Party of Destour (PSD) to deal with presidential absences because of illness. The combination must consist of the election of Prime Minister Hédi Nouira as Vice-President and then the appointment of Farhat as Prime Minister. However, the project was abandoned after the flip-flop of the president who wanted to keep his grip on power and not appoint a dolphin.

Farhat was then appointed on 9 August 1972 as head of the Ministry of Defense. On January 14, 1974, he was transferred to the head of the Ministry of Equipment and Housing before returning to the Ministry of Transport and Telecommunications on September 25.

On May 31, 1976, he led again the Ministry of Defense. In addition, after the dismissal of Tahar Belkhodja, he briefly took over as head of the Ministry of the Interior (23 December-26 December 1977).

At the PSD Congress in 1979, Nouira tried to be elected Secretary General. However, Bourguiba managed to counter this new attempt to weaken his power and sanctioned the organizers of the congress including Farhat who was dismissed from the government on September 12 and the Political Bureau. Dying in 1985, he is buried in the cemetery Sidi Ammar de Rades.

Today, a school located in Rades bears his name.

Preceded by Béchir M'hedhbi	Defense Minister of Tunisia; 1972-1974	Succeeded by Hédi Khefacha
Preceded by Hédi Khefacha	Defense Minister of Tunisia; 1976-1979	Succeeded by Rachid Sfar
Preceded by Tahar Belkhodja	Interior Minister of Tunisia; 1977	Succeeded by Dhaoui Hannablia
