= Fouad Mebazaa =

Tunisian politician (1933–2025)

- فؤاد المبزع
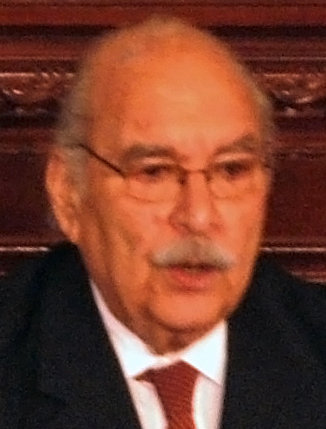
- Mebazaa in 2011

Acting President of Tunisia
- In office 15 January 2011 – 13 December 2011
- Prime Minister: Mohamed Ghannouchi; Béji Caïd Essebsi
- Preceded by: Mohamed Ghannouchi (interim)
- Succeeded by: Moncef Marzouki

Speaker of the Chamber of Deputies
- In office 14 October 1997 – 15 January 2011
- President: Zine El Abidine Ben Ali
- Preceded by: Habib Boularès
- Succeeded by: Sahbi Karoui (acting)

President of Tunisian Football Federation
- In office 1964–1965
- Preceded by: Mohammed Mzali
- Succeeded by: Sadok Es-Soussi

Personal details
- Born: 15 June 1933 Tunis, French protectorate of Tunisia
- Died: 23 April 2025 (aged 91) Tunis, Tunisia
- Party: Independent (2011–2025)
- Other political affiliations: Constitutional Democratic Rally (before 2011)
- Spouse: Lilia Mebazaa

Fouad Mebazaa (Arabic: فؤاد المبزع, romanized: Fuʾād el-Mbazaʿ; 15 June 1933 – 23 April 2025) was a Tunisian politician who was the acting president of Tunisia from 15 January 2011 to 13 December 2011. He was active in Neo Destour prior to Tunisian independence, served as Minister of Youth and Sports, Minister of Public Health, and Minister of Culture and Information, and was Speaker of the Chamber of Deputies of Tunisia from 1991 to 2011.

== Political career ==
=== Pre-independence ===
Born during the French occupation of Tunisia, Mebazaa became a member of the "constitutional youth" in 1947 and was elected a member of the Aix–Marseille unit of the Neo Destour political party, which played a major role in gaining independence from France. He was elected as Secretary-General of the Marsa unit of Neo Destour in 1955 and President of its Montpellier unit in 1956.

=== 1956–2010 ===
After Tunisian independence in 1956, Mebazaa was elected to the Chamber of Deputies several times, starting in 1964. He was Governor-Mayor of Tunis from 1969 to 1973, occupied several ministerial posts relating to youth, sports, public health, culture and information during the 1970s and late 1980s, and was an ambassador in Geneva and Morocco during the 1980s. Mebazaa was a member of the Central Committee of the Constitutional Democratic Rally from 1988 onwards. From 1995 to 1998 he was Mayor of Carthage. He was also elected President of the Chamber of Deputies in 1997 and reelected in 2004.

=== 2011 presidency ===
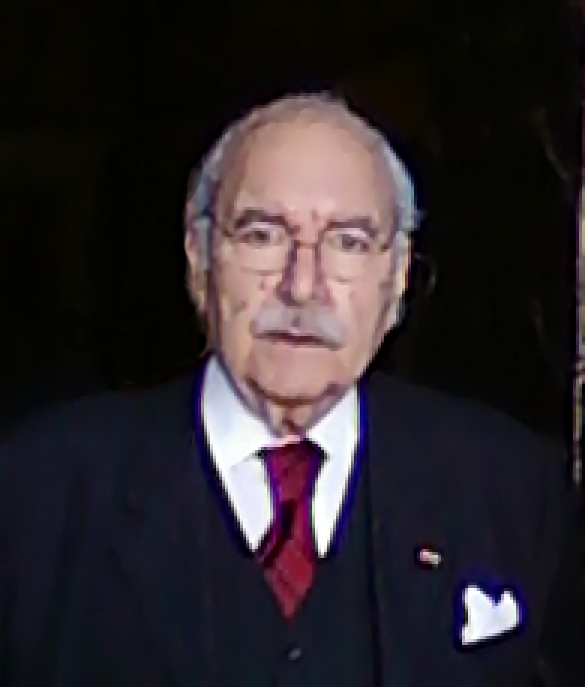
Mebazaa on the day of his accession to the presidency on 15 January 2011.

During the Tunisian Revolution, President Zine El Abidine Ben Ali left Tunisia on 14 January 2011 after being replaced by Mohamed Ghannouchi. The next day, Fouad Mebazaa, as Speaker of the Chamber of Deputies, was appointed acting President of the Republic by the Constitutional Council, in accordance with article 57 of the 1959 Constitution. He was then considered as a cacique of the fallen regime.

Ghannouchi, confirmed as prime minister, appointed a new government on 17 January, while Mebazaa left the Democratic Constitutional Rally the next day. He also stated that, given his role and his presidential function, he temporarily left the office of the Speaker of the Assembly of the Representatives of the People to his first vice-president Sahbi Karoui on 15 January 2011. Sahbi Karoui held the post in the interim with the first meeting having been on 4 February 2011.

On 19 January 2011, Mebazza announced in a speech that the security situation in the country was improving significantly and stabilizing; he also ensured that those responsible for the disturbances were unmasked and arrested. He said that he wanted to ensure that the government respects its commitments in complete disharmony with the past. The next day, five members of the government, including Kamel Morjane, Ridha Grira, Ahmed Friaa, Moncer Rouissi, and Zouheir M'Dhaffar resigned.

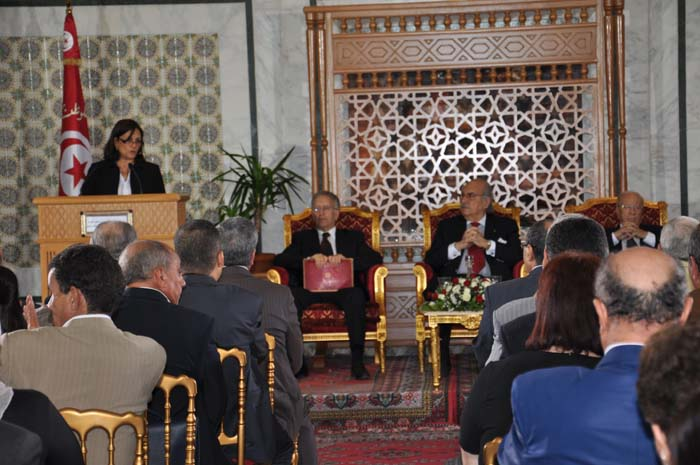
Mebazaa with Beji Caid Essebsi, Yadh Ben Achour and Latifa Lakhdar in Tunis on 13 October 2011.

Pending free elections, the Chamber of Advisors adopted on 9 February 2011 a law that allows the acting president to govern by decree-laws, two days after the vote of the Chamber of Deputies. On 27 February 2011 Ghannouchi resigned in favour of Beji Caid Essebsi, who formed a new government.

Mebazza announced, on 3 March 2011, the election of a Constituent Assembly to develop a new Constitution to replace that of 1959. He said in this regard during his speech:

"Political reform requires us to find a new constitutional basis that reflects the will of the people and benefits from popular legitimacy [...] The current Constitution no longer meets the ambitions of the people after the revolution and is overwhelmed by the circumstances, not to mention the vicissitudes that have affected it, because of the many amendments that have been made to it and which prevent real democratic life and constitute an obstacle to the organization of transparent elections and the establishment of a political climate in which each individual and each group can enjoy freedom and equality. "

Moncef Marzouki replaced him on 12 December 2011; Mebazaa announced the same day his intention to officially hand over presidential powers during a solemn ceremony. The next day, Mebazaa greeted Marzouki one last time at the Presidential Palace, before leaving by car for his personal residence in Tunis.

== Death ==
Mebazaa died on 23 April 2025, at the age of 91, after a long illness. He is buried in the Jellaz Cemetery, in Tunis.

== Honours ==
Ribbon bar	Country	Honour
	Tunisia	Grand Cordon of the Order of the Independence
	Tunisia	Grand Cordon of the Order of the Republic
	Tunisia	Grand Cordon of the National Order of Merit
	Tunisia	Grand Cordon of the Order of the Seventh of November
	Morocco	Grand Officer of the Order of Ouissam Alaouite
	Mauritania	Grand Officer of the National Order of Merit
	France	Commander of the Legion of Honour
	Italy	Commander of the Order of Merit of the Italian Republic

Political offices
Preceded by Habib Boularès	Speaker of the Chamber of Deputies; 1997–2011	Succeeded by Sahbi Karoui; Acting
Preceded by Mohamed Ghannouchi; Acting	President of Tunisia; Acting; 2011	Succeeded by Moncef Marzouki
