= Mourou =

Mourou is a surname. Notable people with the surname include:

- Abdelfattah Mourou, Tunisian lawyer and politician (Ennahda)
- Gérard Mourou, French physicist
