= Beji Caid Essebsi =

President of Tunisia from 2014 to 2019

His Excellency Beji Caid Essebsi
- الباجي قائد السبسي
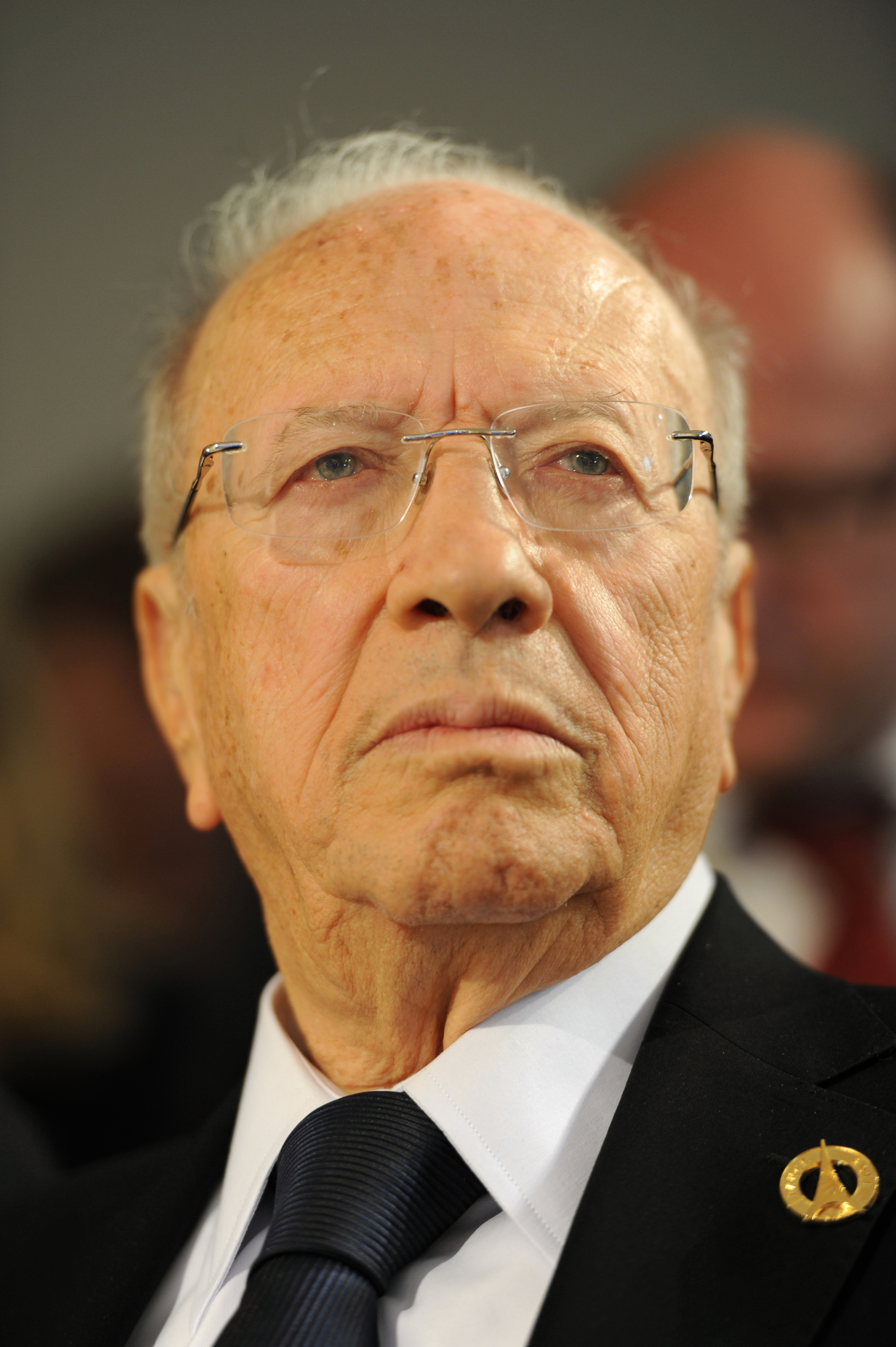
- Essebsi in 2011

4th President of Tunisia
- In office 31 December 2014 – 25 July 2019
- Prime Minister: Mehdi Jomaa; Habib Essid; Youssef Chahed
- Preceded by: Moncef Marzouki
- Succeeded by: Mohamed Ennaceur (acting)

Prime Minister of Tunisia
- In office 28 February 2011 – 24 December 2011
- President: Fouad Mebazaa (Acting); Moncef Marzouki
- Preceded by: Mohamed Ghannouchi
- Succeeded by: Hamadi Jebali

Speaker of the Chamber of Deputies
- In office 14 March 1990 – 9 October 1991
- President: Zine El Abidine Ben Ali
- Preceded by: Slaheddine Baly
- Succeeded by: Habib Boularès

Minister of Foreign Affairs
- In office 15 April 1981 – 15 September 1986
- Prime Minister: Mohammed Mzali; Rachid Sfar
- Preceded by: Hassen Belkhodja
- Succeeded by: Hédi Mabrouk

Personal details
- Born: Mohamed Beji Caid Essebsi; 29 November 1926 Sidi Bou Said, French Tunisia
- Died: 25 July 2019 (aged 92) Tunis, Tunisia
- Resting place: Jellaz Cemetery, Tunis
- Party: Nidaa Tounes (2012–2019)
- Other political affiliations: Neo Destour/PSD/RCD (1941–2011); Independent (2011–2012)
- Spouse: Chadlia Farhat Essebsi (m. 1958)
- Children: 4

Beji Caid Essebsi (or es-Sebsi; Arabic: الباجي قائد السبسي, romanized: al-Bājī Qā’id as-Sibsī,; 29 November 1926 – 25 July 2019) was a Tunisian politician who served as the fourth president of Tunisia from 2014 until his death in 2019. Previously, he served as minister of foreign affairs from 1981 to 1986 and prime minister from February to December 2011.

Essebsi's political career spanned six decades, culminating in his leadership of Tunisia in its transition to democracy. Essebsi was the founder of the Nidaa Tounes political party, which won a plurality in the 2014 parliamentary election. In December 2014, he won the first regular presidential election following the Tunisian Revolution, becoming Tunisia's first democratically elected president.

== Early life ==
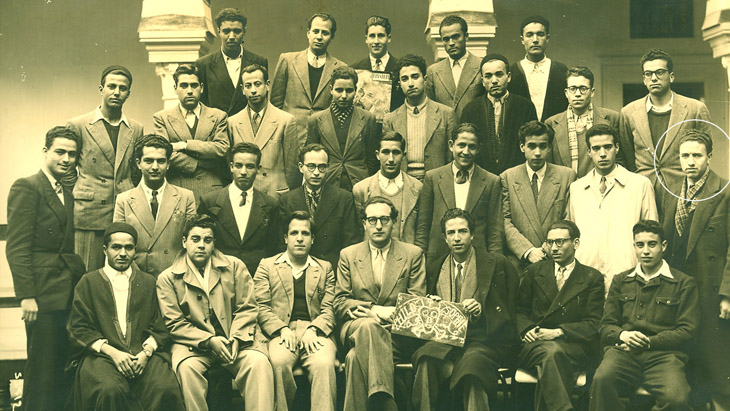
Promotion photograph at Sadiki College featuring Caid Essebsi (second row, circled on the right)

Born in Sidi Bou Said on 29 November 1926, to an elite family originally from Sardinia (Italy), he was the great-grandson of Ismail Caïd Essebsi, a Sardinian kidnapped by Barbary corsairs in the Beylik of Tunis along the coasts of the island at the beginning of the nineteenth century, who then became a mamluk leader (he was raised with the ruling family after converting to Islam and was later recognized as a free man when he became an important member of the government).

== Political career ==
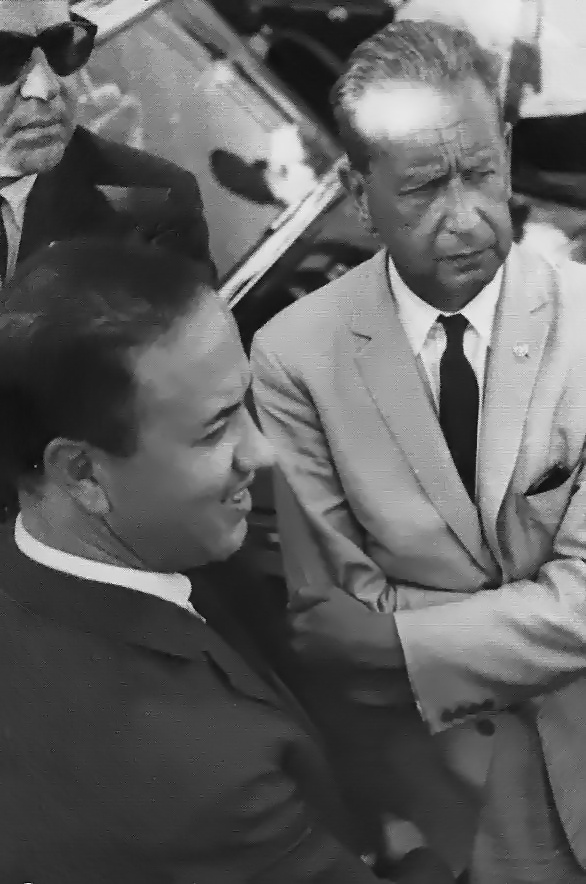
Beji Caid Essebsi with Secretary-General of the United Nations, Dag Hammarskjöld, in 1961

Essebsi's first involvement in politics came in 1941, when he joined the Neo Destour youth organization in Hammam-Lif. He went to France in 1950 to study law in Paris. He began his career as a lawyer defending Neo-Destour activists. Essebsi later joined Tunisia's leader Habib Bourguiba as a supporter of the Tunisian separatist movement and later as his adviser following the country's independence from France in 1956.

Essebsi, a protégé of Bourguiba, held various posts under Bourguiba from 1957 to 1971, including chief of the regional administration, general director of the Sûreté nationale, Interior Minister in 1965, Minister-Delegate to the Prime Minister, Defense Minister in 1969, and then Ambassador to Paris.

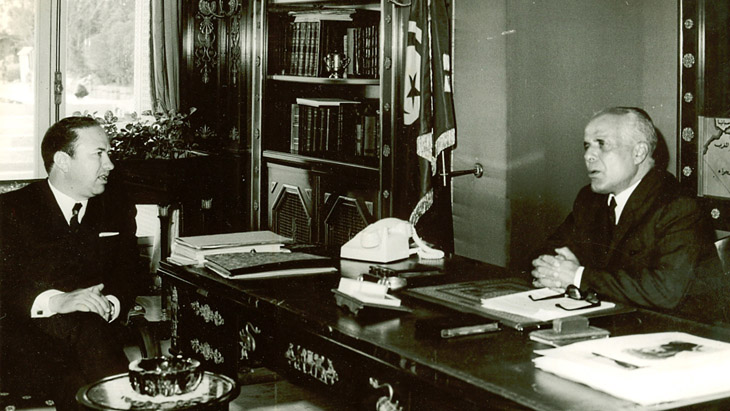
Essebsi with Habib Bourguiba, (Carthage Palace, 1965)

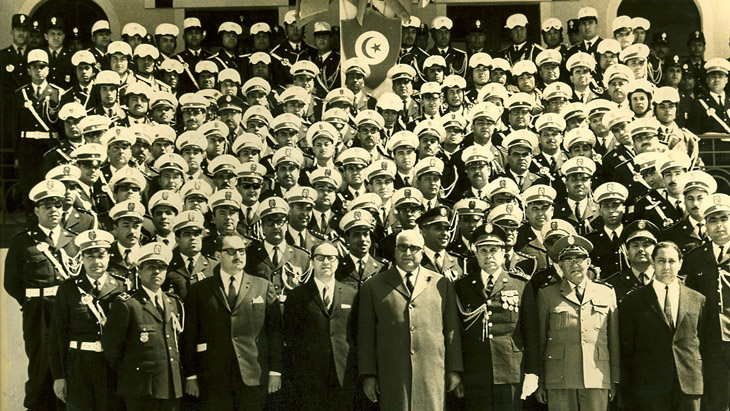
Beji Caid Essebsi as Minister of Defense in Tunis, 1969

From October 1971 to January 1972, he advocated greater democracy in Tunisia and resigned his function, then returning to Tunis.

In April 1981, he came back to the government under Mohamed Mzali as Minister of Foreign Affairs, serving until September 1986. In 1987, he switched allegiance following Ben Ali's removal of Bourguiba from power. He was appointed as Ambassador to West Germany. From 1990 to 1991, he was the Speaker of the Chamber of Deputies.

=== Interim Prime Minister in 2011 ===
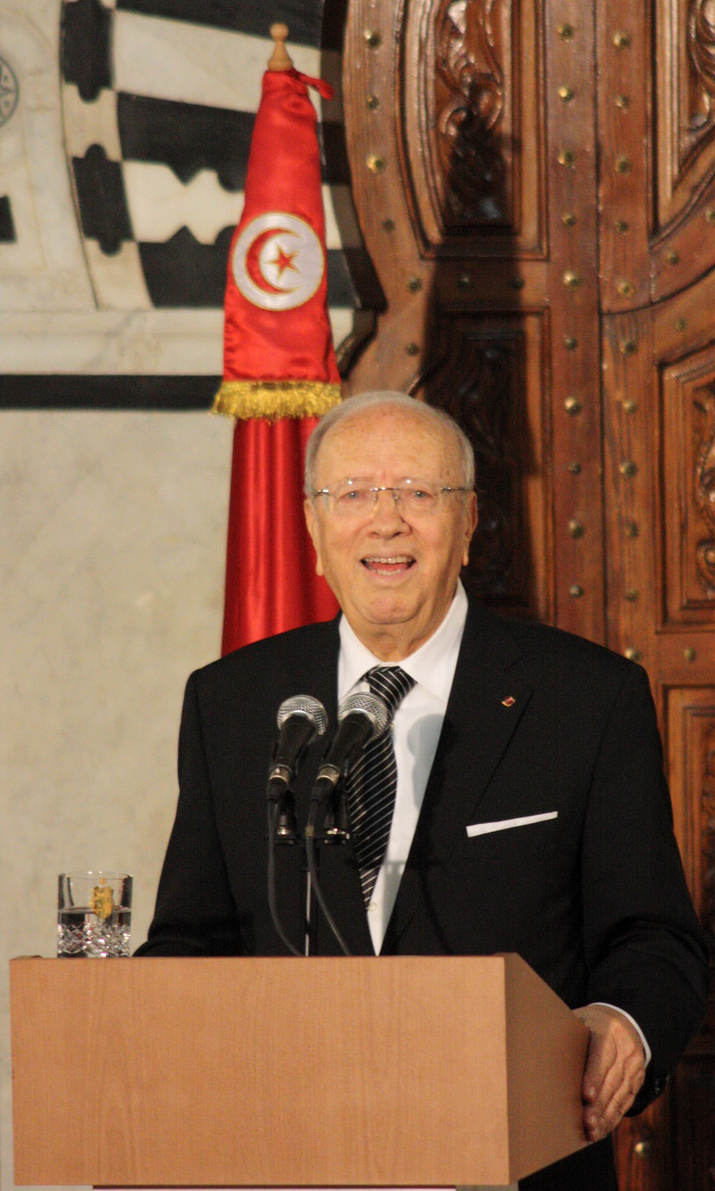
Essebsi in 2011

On 27 February 2011, in the aftermath of the Tunisian Revolution that ousted long-serving leader Ben Ali, Tunisian Prime Minister Mohamed Ghannouchi then resigned following a day of clashes in Tunis with five protesters being killed. On the same day, acting President Fouad Mebazaa appointed Caïd Essebsi as the new Prime Minister, describing him as "a person with an impeccable political and private life, known for his profound patriotism, his loyalty and his self-sacrifice in serving his country." The mostly young protesters continued taking their discontent to the streets, criticizing the unilateral appointment of Essebsi without further consultation. Essesbi nevertheless has been described as someone who had "remained at a distance from Ben Ali" since his leaving politics in 1991, a move significant for "contribut[ing] to his credibility and acceptance" in the years following the 2011 revolution, the post-Ben Ali era.

On 5 May accusations of the former Interior Minister Farhat Rajhi that a coup d'etat was being prepared against the possibility of the Islamic party Ennahda Party winning the Constituent Assembly election in October. This, again, led to several days of fierce anti-Government protests and clashes on the streets. In the interview disseminated on Facebook, Rajhi called Caïd Essebsi a "liar", whose government had been manipulated by the old Ben Ali circles. Caïd Essebsi strongly rejected Rajhi's accusations as "dangerous and irresponsible lies, [aimed at spreading] chaos in the country" and also dismissed him from his post as director of the High Commission for Human Rights and Fundamental Freedoms, which he had retained after being dismissed from the office as Interior Minister already on 8 March. Nevertheless, Ennahda's president Rached Ghannouchi further fueled the suspicions, stating that "Tunisians doubt the credibility of the Transitional Government."

After the elections in October, Caïd Essebsi left office on 24 December 2011 when the new Interim President Moncef Marzouki appointed Hamadi Jebali of the Islamist Ennahda, which had become the largest parliamentary group.

=== 2014 elections ===
Following his departure from office, Caïd Essebsi founded the secular Nidaa Tounes party, which won a plurality of the seats in the October 2014 parliamentary election. He was also the party's candidate in the country's first free presidential elections, in November 2014.

On 22 December 2014, official election results showed that Essebsi had defeated incumbent President Moncef Marzouki in the second round of voting, receiving 55.68% of the vote. After the polls closed the previous day, Essebsi said on local television that he dedicated his victory to "the martyrs of Tunisia".

=== President of Tunisia ===
Essebsi was sworn in as president on 31 December 2014 at the age of 88, he was the first freely elected president of modern Tunisia. He played a vital role in helping ensure that, more than any other Arab state, the North African country preserved many of the essential gains of the Arab spring movement, which began in Tunisia originally. He vowed on the occasion of his swearing-in to "be president of all Tunisian men and women without exclusion" and stressed the importance of "consensus among all parties and social movements".

On 3 August 2016, Essebsi appointed Youssef Chahed as a prime minister as the parliament withdrew confidence from Habib Essid's government.

In 2017, he called for legal amendments to the inheritance law to ensure equal rights for men and women, and he called for Tunisian women to be able to marry non-Muslims, which he believed to be not in direct conflict with Sharia nor with the Tunisian constitution.

In 2018, he proposed a revision of Tunisian electoral law, which he felt contained many shortcomings going against the principles of the 2011 revolution.

On 13 August 2018, he promised also to submit a bill to parliament soon which would aim to give women equal inheritance rights with men, as debate over the controversial topic of inheritance reverberated then throughout the Muslim world.

Not long before his death, concerning the economic crisis of Tunisia (widely believed to be the foremost political problem in the country in the post-revolutionary era), he declared that the year 2018 would be difficult, but that the hope of economic revival was still possible.

In April 2019, Essebsi announced he would not seek a second term in that year's presidential election, saying it was time to "open the door to the youth."

Beji Caid Essebsi was recognized for his role in reinforcing democratic advances in the face of economic hardship and terrorism.

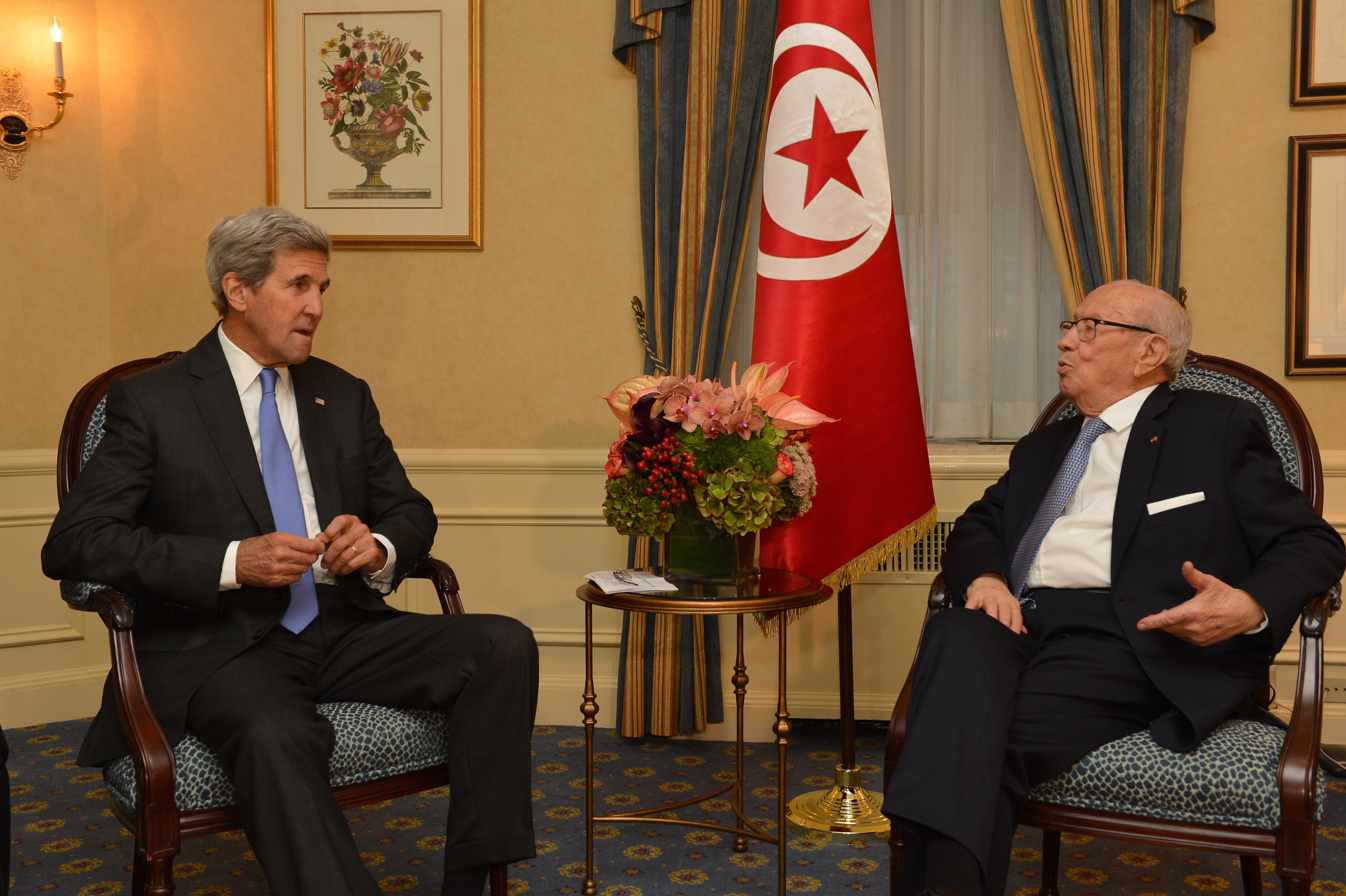
Essebsi with U.S. Secretary of State John Kerry (19 September 2016 in New York City)

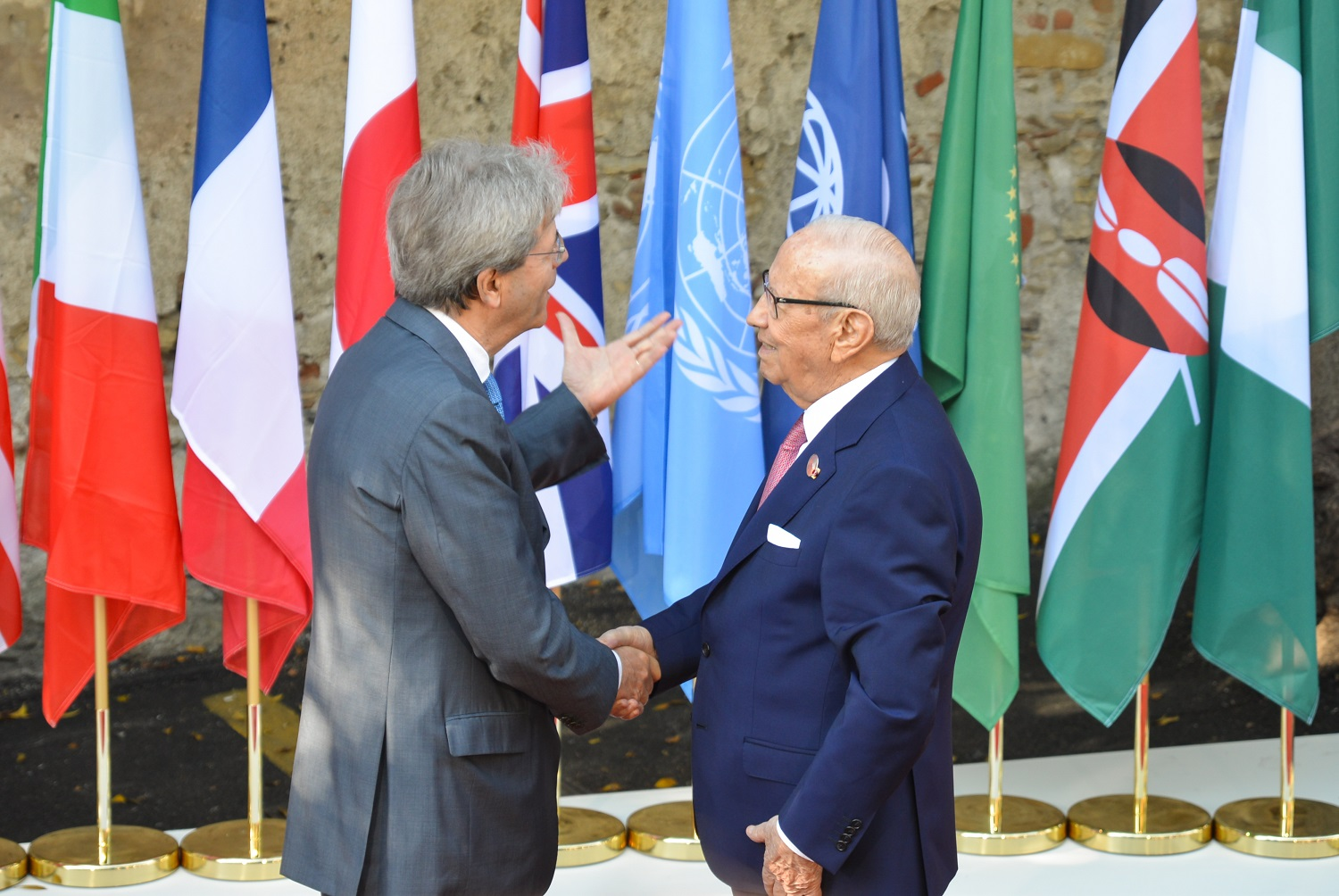
Essebsi with Prime Minister of Italy Paolo Gentiloni in May 2017.

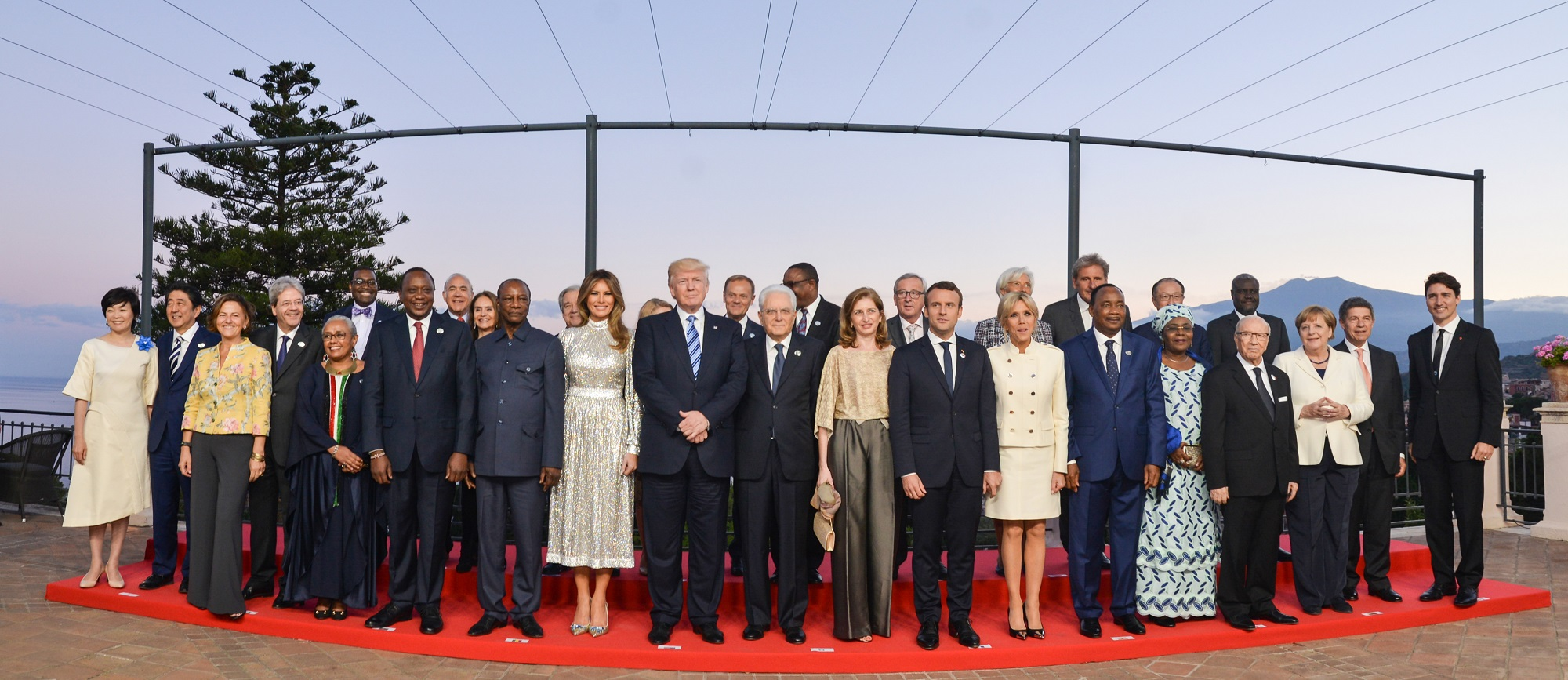
Essebsi at the 43rd G7 summit in 2017.

== Illness and death ==
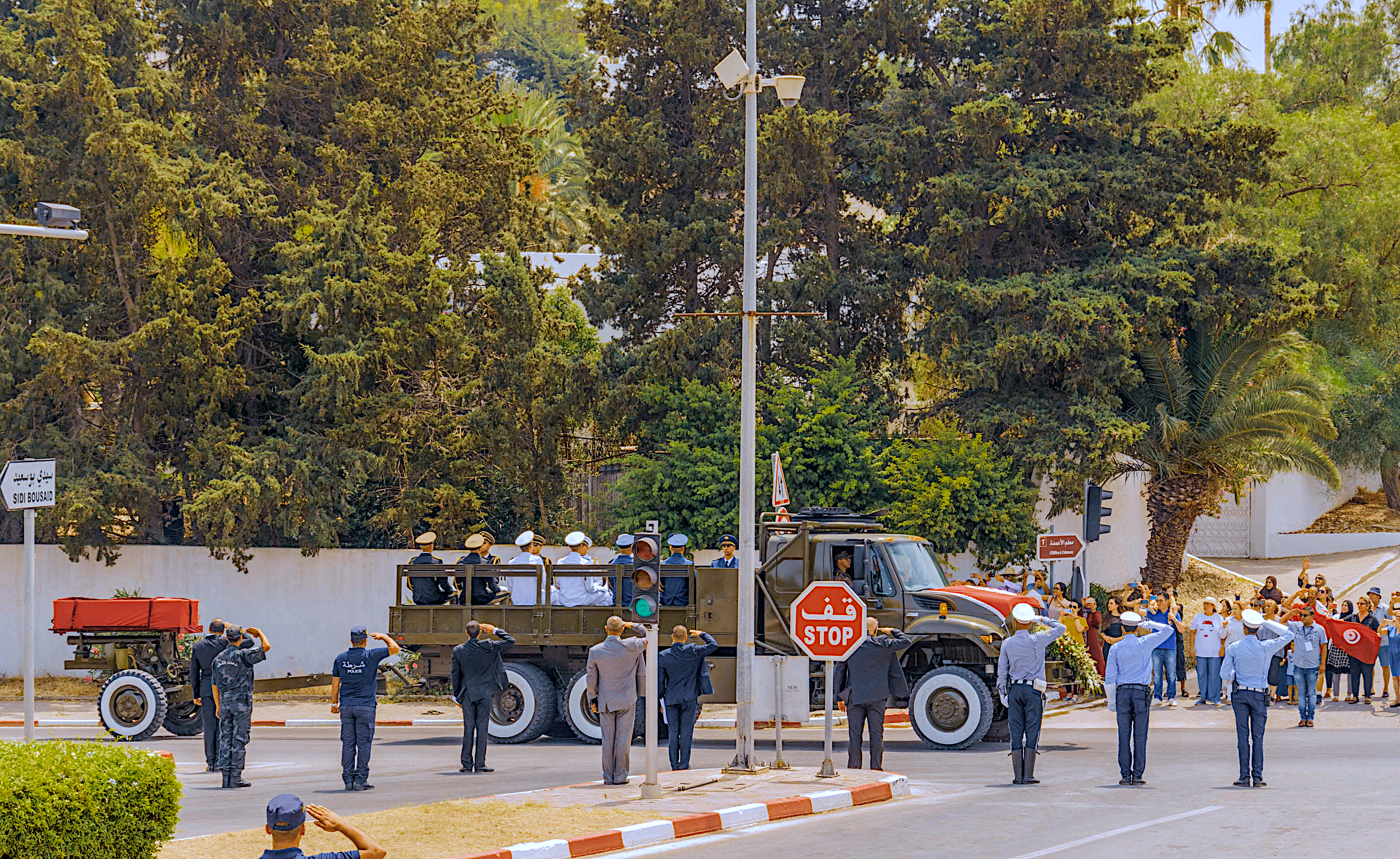
Funeral of Beji Caid Essebsi on 27 July 2019.

On 27 June 2019, Essebsi was hospitalized at a military hospital in Tunis due to a serious illness. The following day his condition stabilized.

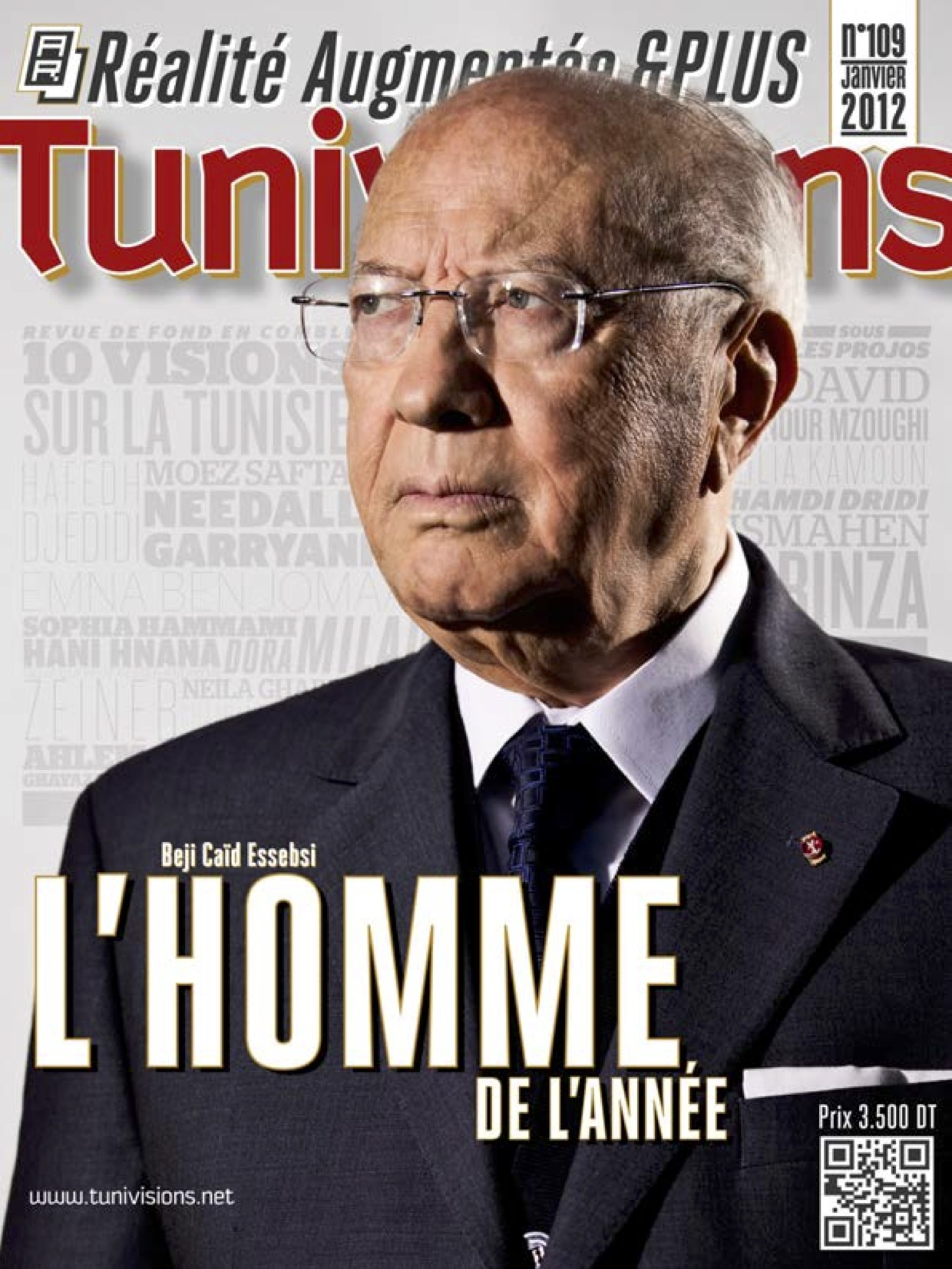
Beji Caid Essebsi on the cover of the magazine Tunivisions, January 2012

He was re-admitted to hospital on 24 July, and died the following day (which coincided with the 62nd anniversary of the abolition of the Tunisian monarchy), five months before the expiration of his term. In addition to Tunisia, which declared mourning for seven days, eight other countries announced official mourning periods of three days after the death of Essebsi, namely Libya, Algeria, Mauritania, Jordan, Palestine, Lebanon, Egypt and Cuba. Likewise, the United Nations stood for a minute of silence and flew flags for a day after Essebsi's death.

The electoral commission announced that Essebsi's successor would be elected sooner than the original date of 17 November, due to the constitutional provision that in the event of the president's death, a permanent successor must be in office within 90 days. The president of the Assembly of Representatives of the People, Mohamed Ennaceur, served as acting president in the meantime. Ultimately, the election was pushed up to 15 September.

His state funeral took place on 27 July in Carthage in the presence of dignitaries such as:

- Mohamed Ennaceur (acting President of Tunisia)
- Emmanuel Macron (President of France)
- Felipe VI (King of Spain)
- Marcelo Rebelo de Sousa (President of Portugal)
- George Vella (President of Malta)
- Albert II (Prince of Monaco)
- Joachim Gauck (former President of Germany)
- Simonetta Sommaruga (Swiss Federal Councillor)
- Abdelkader Bensalah (President of Algeria)
- Mahmoud Abbas (President of Palestine)
- Fayez al-Sarraj (Chairman of the Presidential Council of Libya)
- Tamim bin Hamad Al Thani (Emir of Qatar)
- Ghassan Salame (Deputy Secretary General of the United Nations)
- Ahmed Aboul Gheit (Secretary General of the Arab League)
- Taïeb Baccouche (Secretary General of the Arab Maghreb Union)
- Prince Moulay Rachid of Morocco
- Hamad bin Mohammed Al Sharqi (Emir of Fujairah)
- Fuat Oktay (Vice President of Turkey)
- Stéphane Dion (Special Envoy of the Prime Minister of Canada)
- Ulrich Brechbuhl (Counselor of the United States Department of State).

A procession took place from the Carthage Palace to Jellaz Cemetery, where he was buried. Abdullah II (King of Jordan) also came to Tunisia on 29 July to offer condolences to the acting President of Tunisia Mohamed Ennaceur and to Essebsi's family.

== Personal life ==
Essebsi married Chadlia Saïda Farhat on 8 February 1958. The couple had four children: two daughters, Amel and Salwa, and two sons, Mohamed Hafedh and Khélil.

His wife died on 15 September 2019, aged 83, nearly two months after her husband.

== Honours and awards ==
=== National honours ===
| Ribbon bar | Honours |
|---|---|
| Order of Independence v. 1959 (Tunisia) - ribbon bar | Grand Master & Grand Collar of the Order of Independence |
| Order of the Republic (Tunisia) - ribbon bar | Grand Master & Grand Collar of the Order of the Republic |
| TN Order Merit Rib | Grand Master & Grand Collar of the National Order of Merit of Tunisia |

=== Foreign honours ===
Coat of Arms of Beji Caid Essebsi as Knight of the Collar of the Order of the Seraphim.

- Medal of Honor of the Republic of Algeria (Algeria; 3 January 2013)
- Collar of the Order of Sheikh Isa bin Salman Al Khalifa (Bahrain; 27 January 2016)
- Grand Cross of the Order of Independence (Equatorial Guinea; 27 February 2018)
- Grand Cross with Coller of the Legion of Honour (France; 31 January 2018)
- Grand Cordon of the Supreme Order of the Renaissance (Jordan; 20 October 2015)
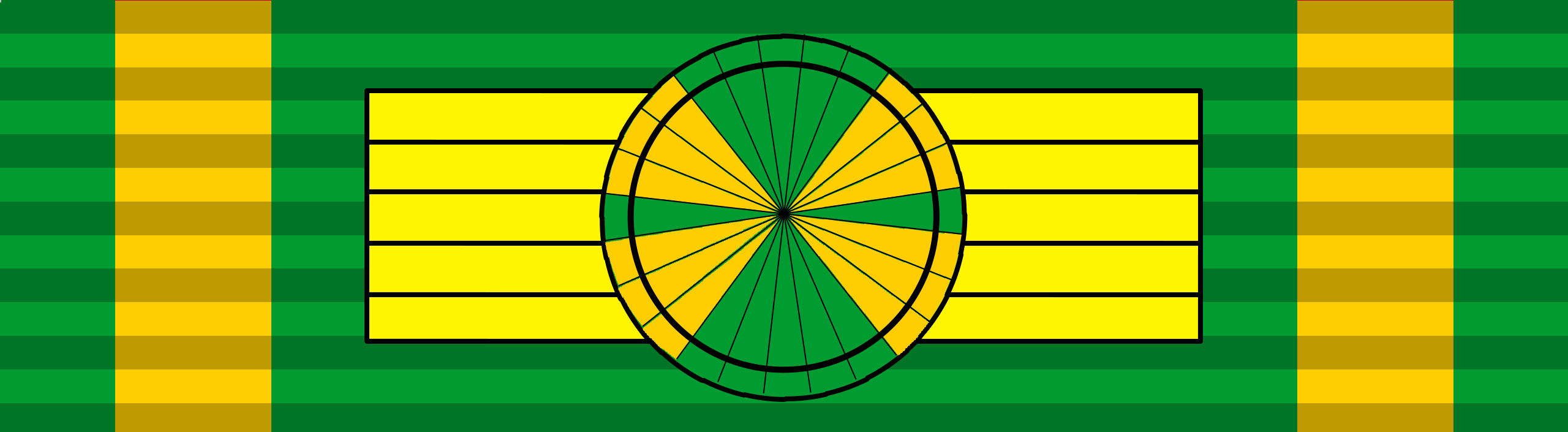
- Collar of the Order of King Abdulaziz (KSA; 29 March 2019)
- Knight Grand Cross with Collar of the Order of Merit of the Italian Republic (Italy; 8 January 2017)
- Honorary Companions of Honour with Collar of the National Order of Merit (Malta; 5 February 2019)
- Grand Officer of the National Order of Merit of Mauritania (Mauritania; 1991)
- Grand Cordon of the Order of Ouissam Alaouite (Morocco; 1991)
- Grand Collar of the State of Palestine (Palestine; 6 July 2017)
- Second Class of the Order of the Republic of Serbia (Serbia; 2016)
- Grand Cross of the Order of Civil Merit (Spain; 28 October 1969)
- Grand Cross of the National Order of the Lion (Senegal; 18 December 2018)
- Knight of the Order of the Seraphim (Sweden; 4 November 2015)
- Collar of the Order of the State of Republic of Turkey (Turkey; 27 December 2017)

=== Awards ===
- Honorary Degree from Paris-Sorbonne University (2015)
- Founder's Award of International Crisis Group (2015)
- Freedom of the City of Amman (2015)
- Medal of Arab tourism (2017)
- Tunisian Politician of the Year (2017)
- Leadership Award of Global Hope Coalition (2018)

== Publications ==
- Bourguiba : le bon grain et l'ivraie, éd. Sud Éditions, Tunis, 2009, ISBN 978- 9973844996
- La Tunisie : la démocratie en terre d'islam (with Arlette Chabot), éd. Plon, Paris, 2016

== Gallery ==
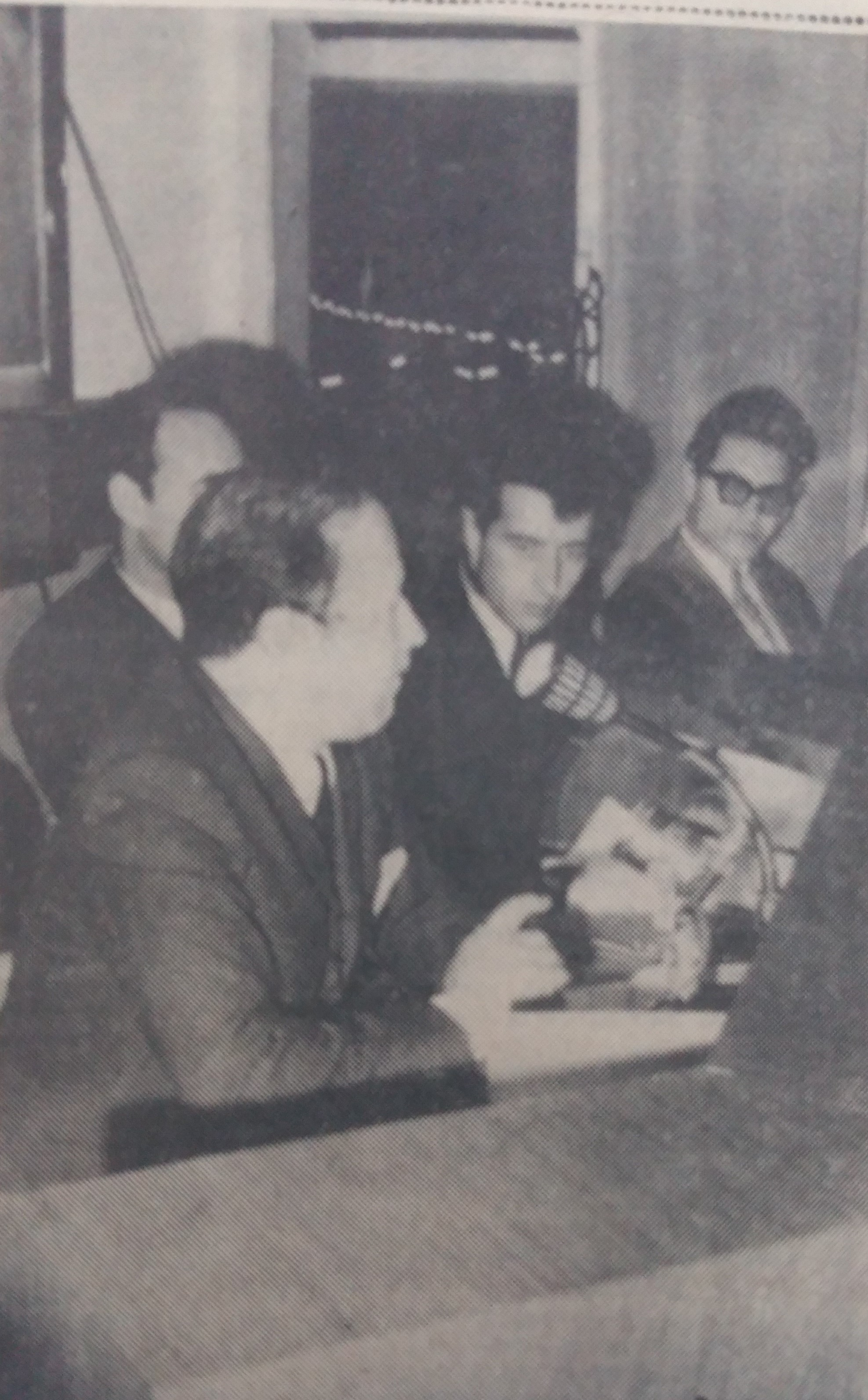
Essebsi giving a speech at the political office of the Socialist Destourian Party.

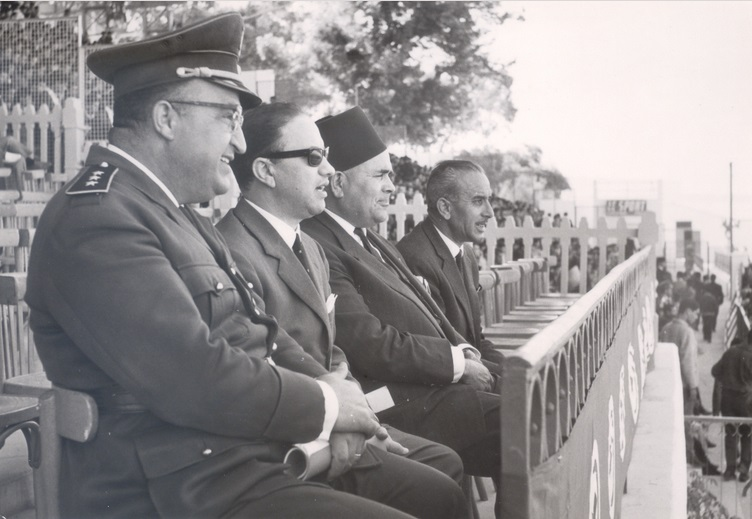
Essebsi in Stade Chedly Zouiten in 1960.

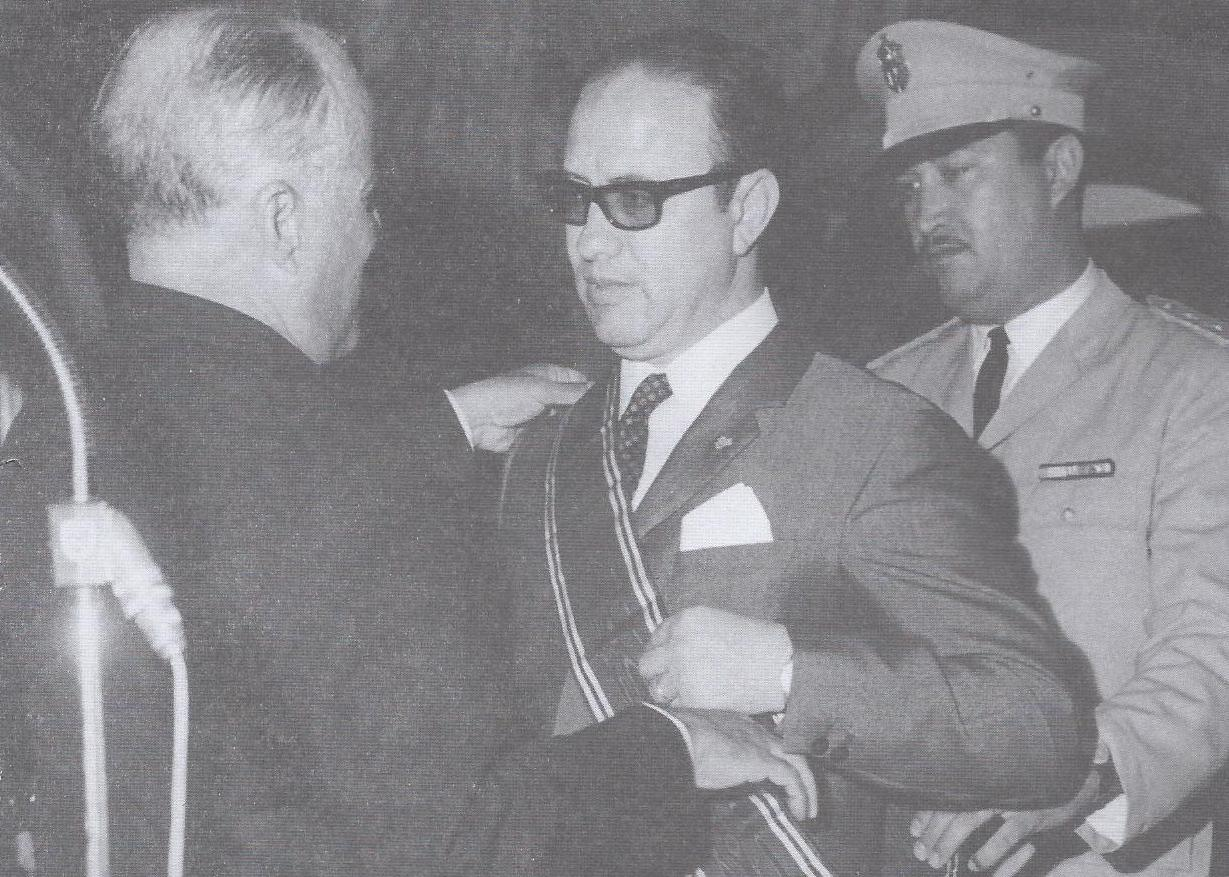
Essebsi decorated by Habib Bourguiba in 1966.

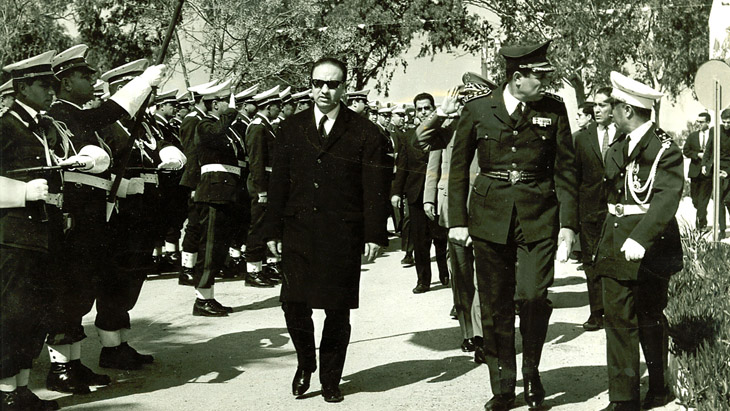
Essebsi as Minister of Defense.

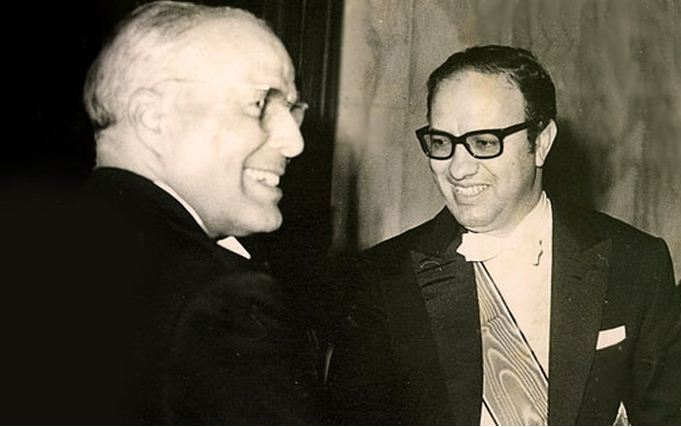
Essebsi with president Bourguiba

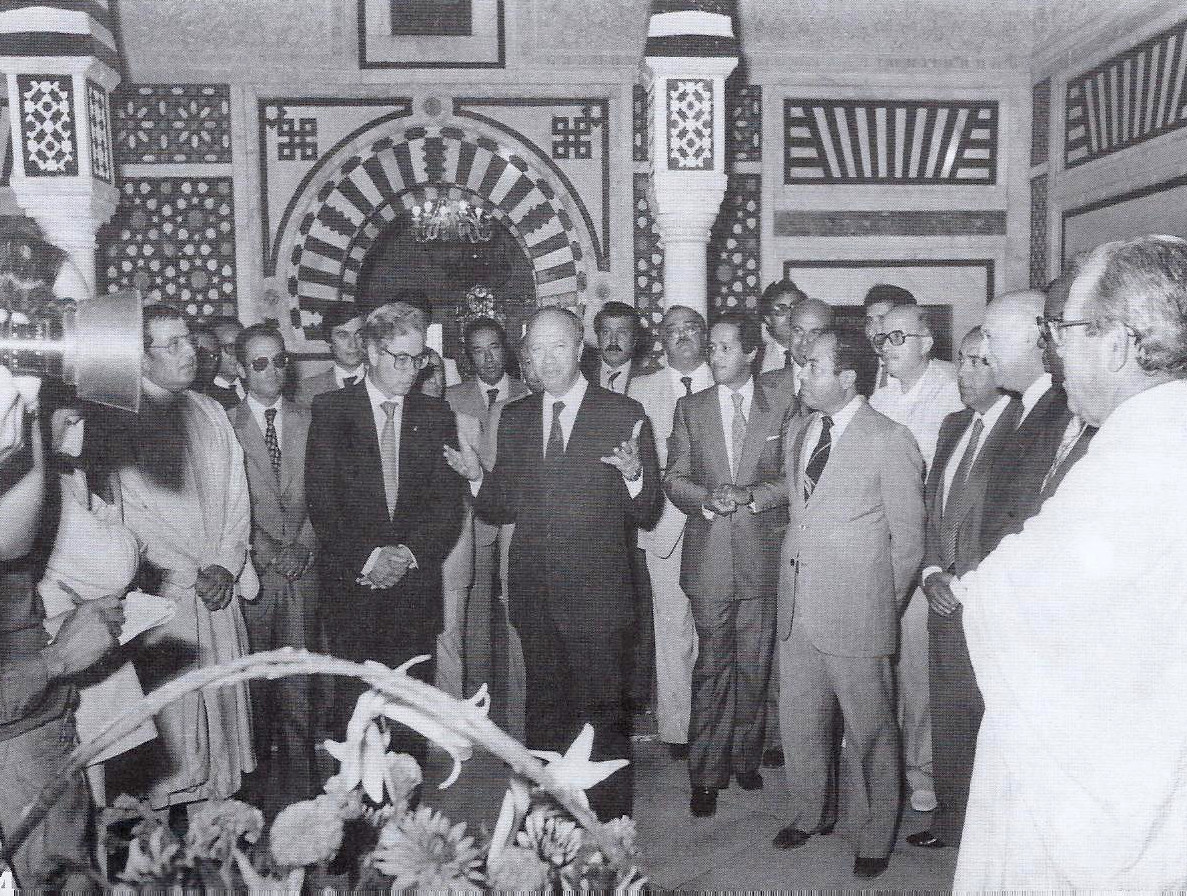
Beji Caid Essebsi at the Ministry of Foreign Affairs in 1981.

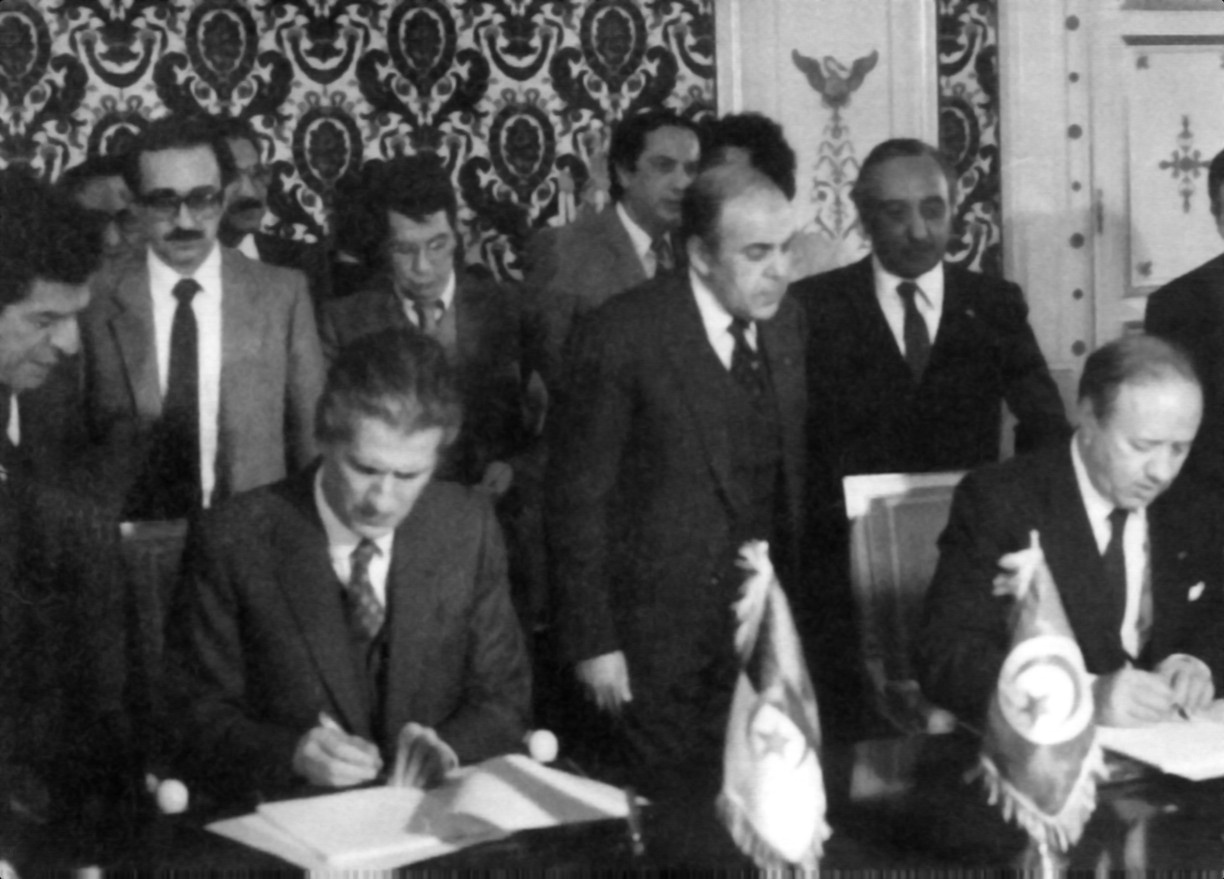
Essebsi and Ahmed Taleb Ibrahimi signing a treaty between Tunisia and Algeria in 1983.

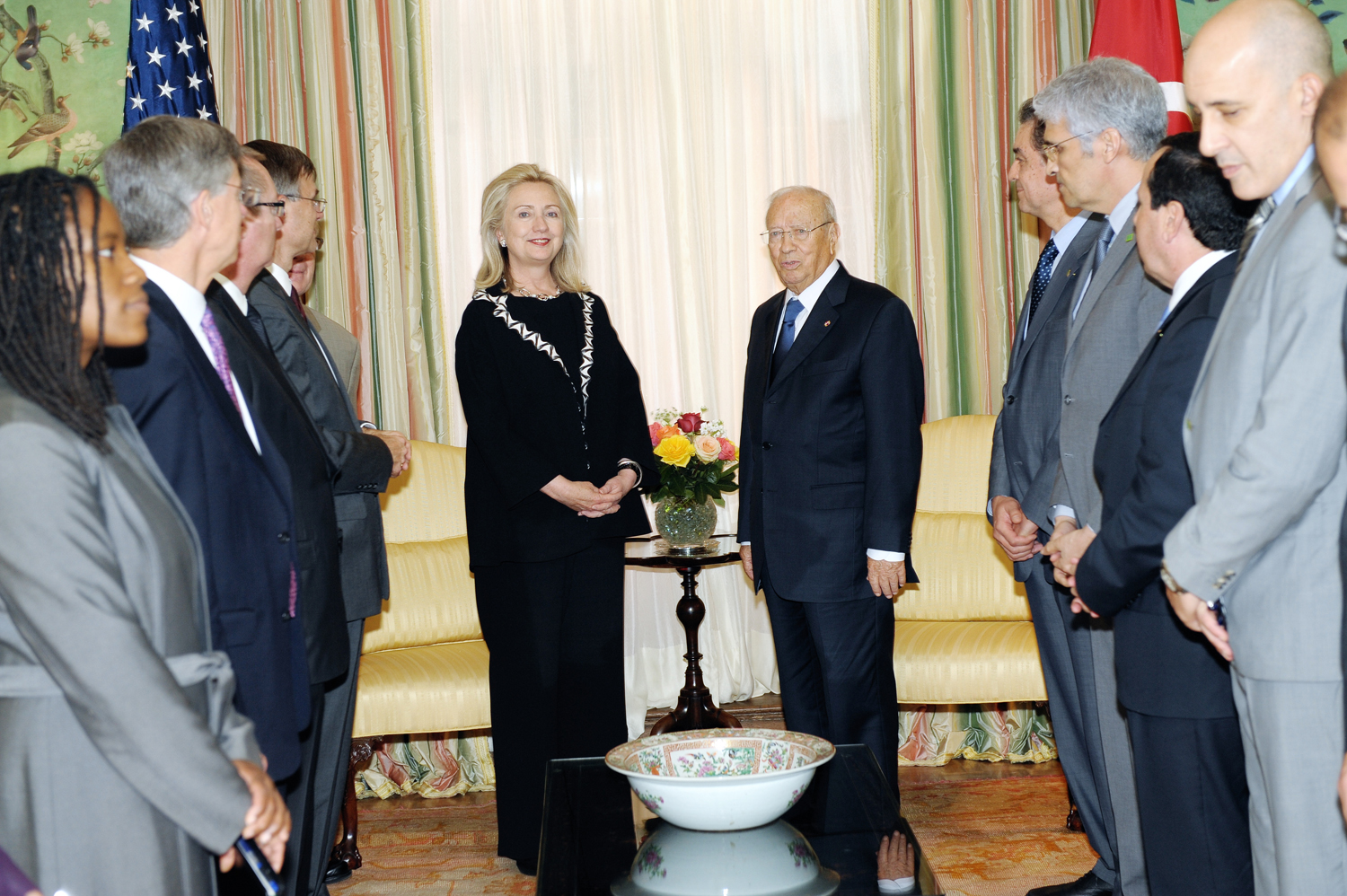
Beji Caid Essebsi and Hillary Clinton in Washington in 2011.

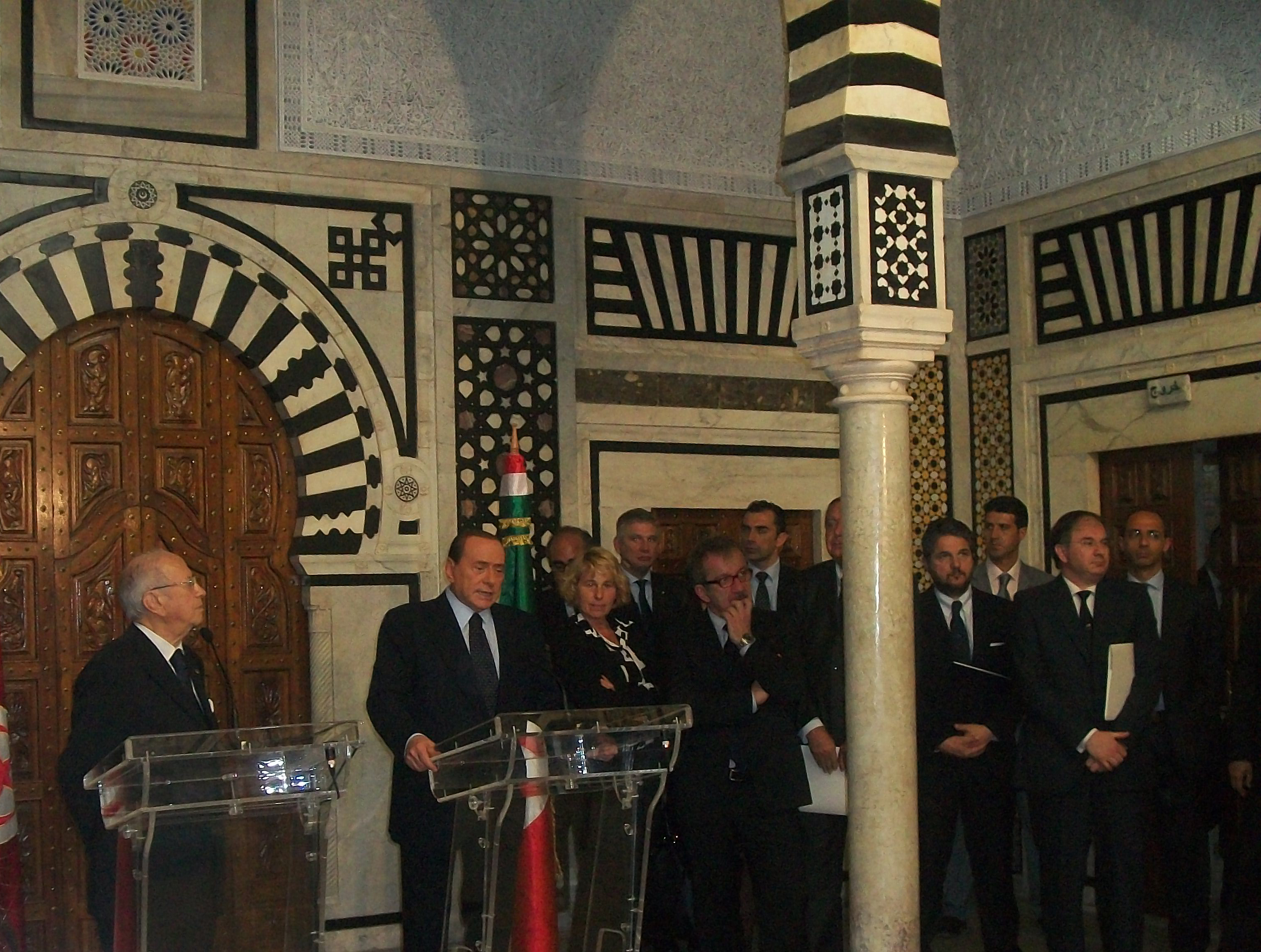
Essebsi at a press conference with Italian Prime Minister Berlusconi in 2011.

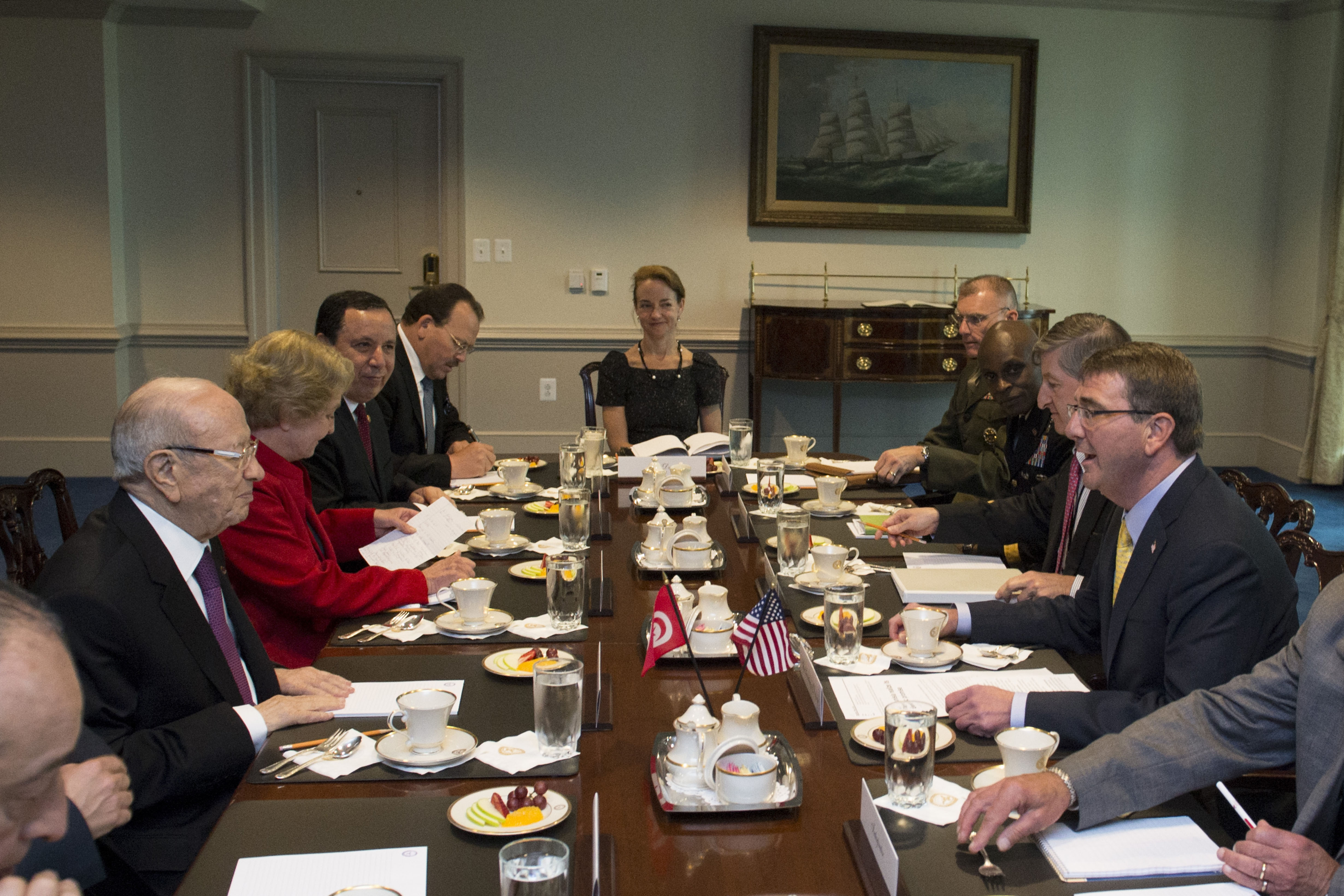
Essebsi and US Secretary of Defense Ashton Carter at the Pentagon in 2015.

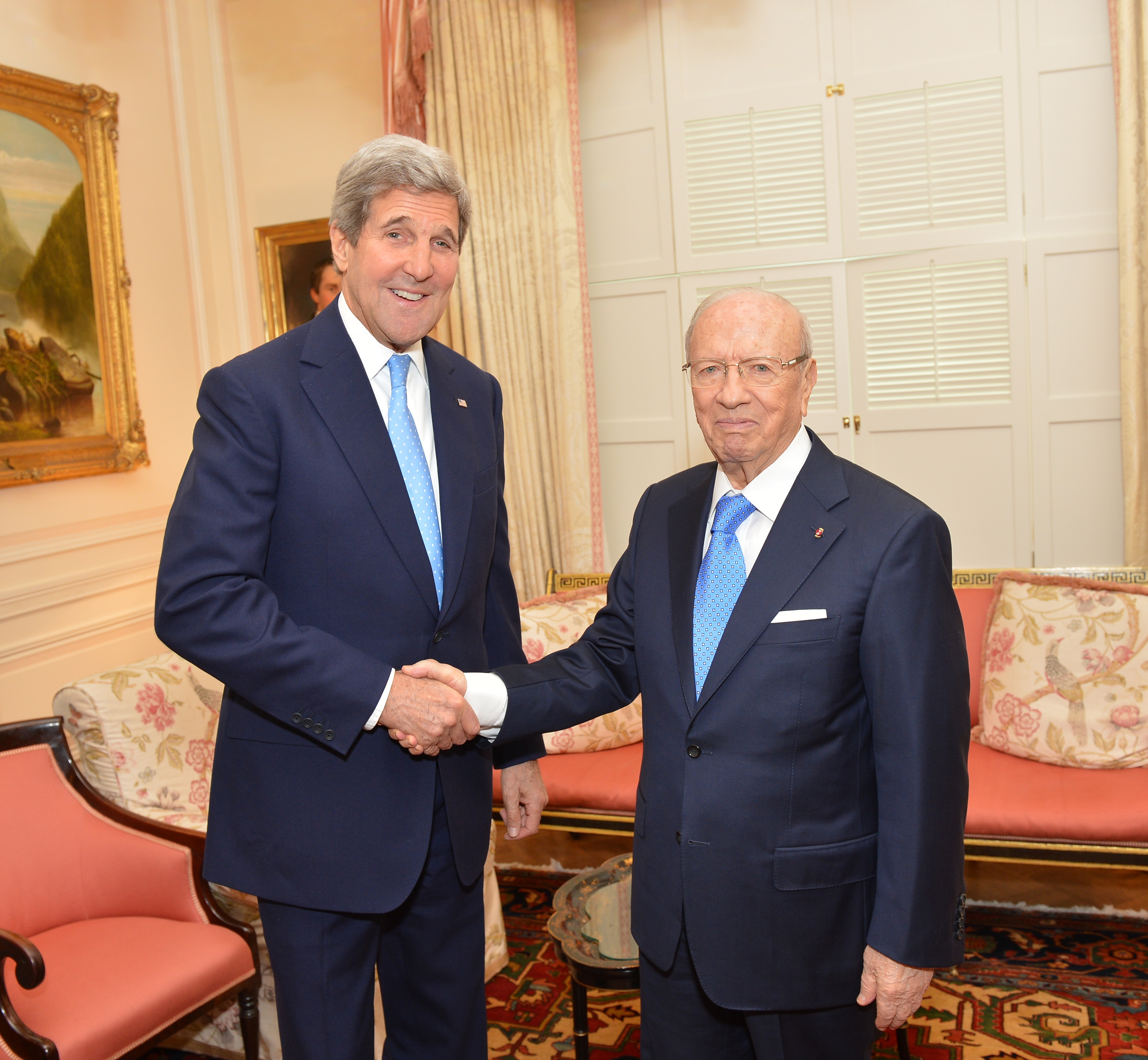
Essebsi during meeting with John Kerry in May 2015.

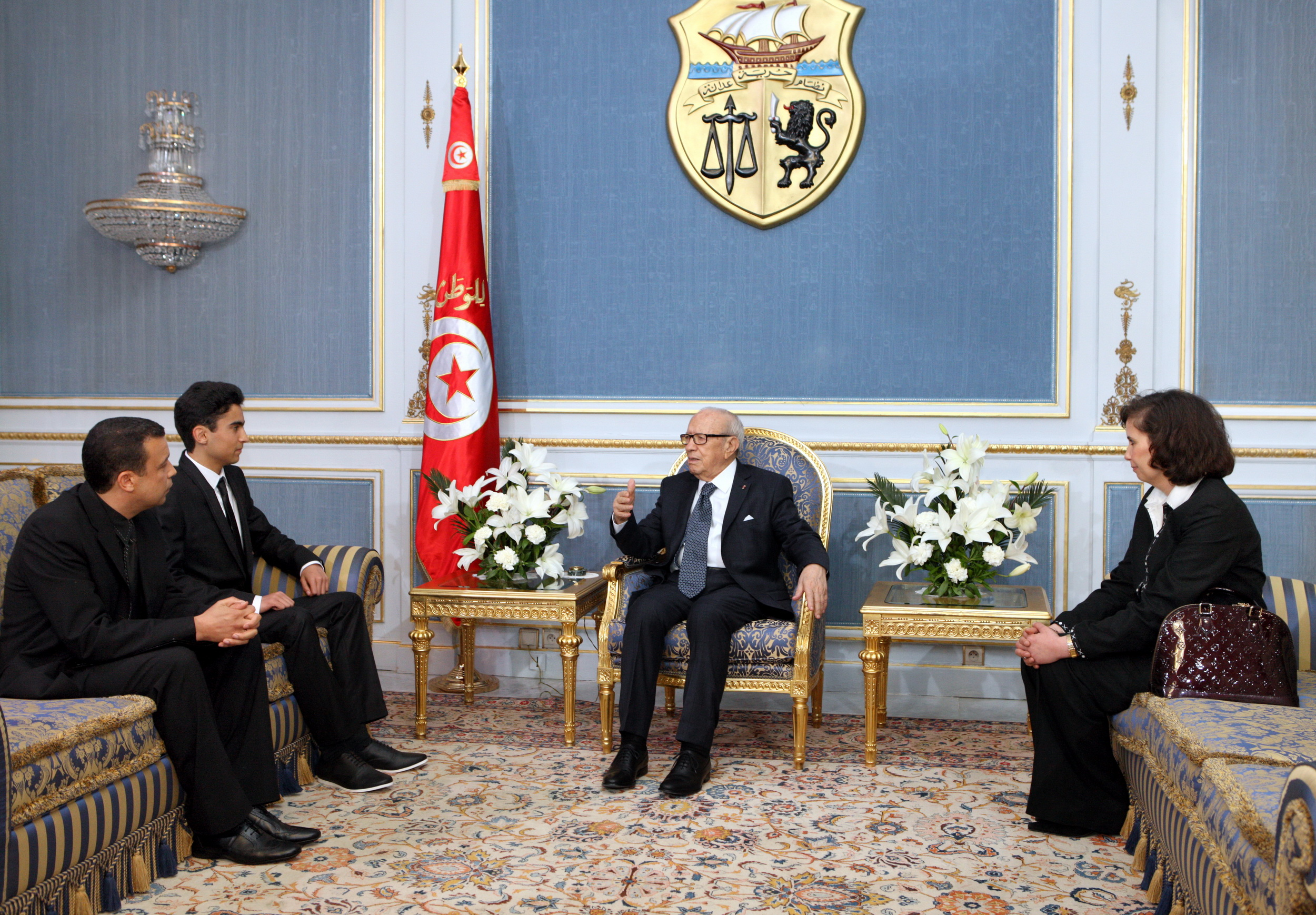
Essebsi receiving a delegation in the presidential palace.

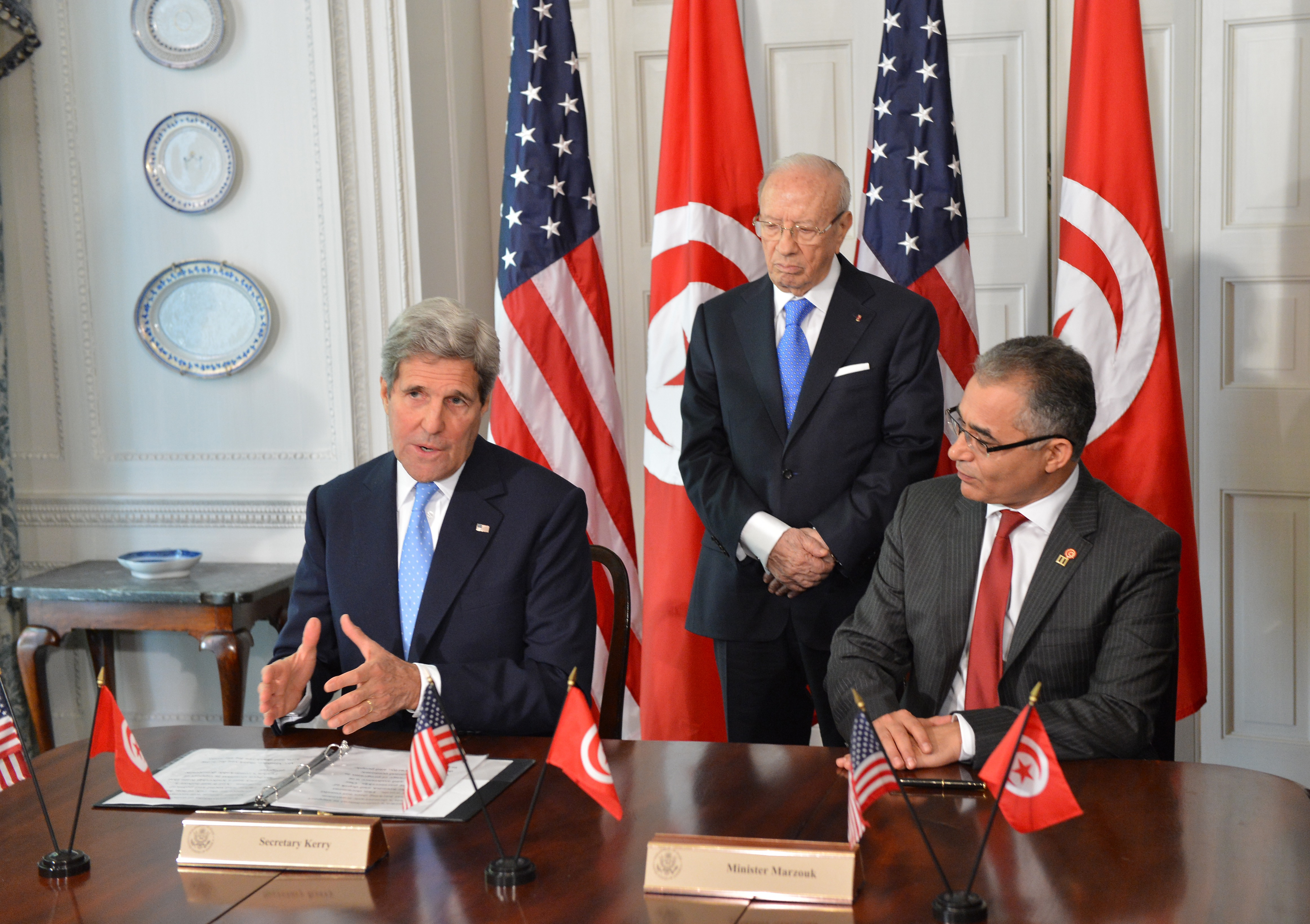
Essebsi oversees a MOU between his adviser Mohsen Marzouk and John Kerry in 2015.

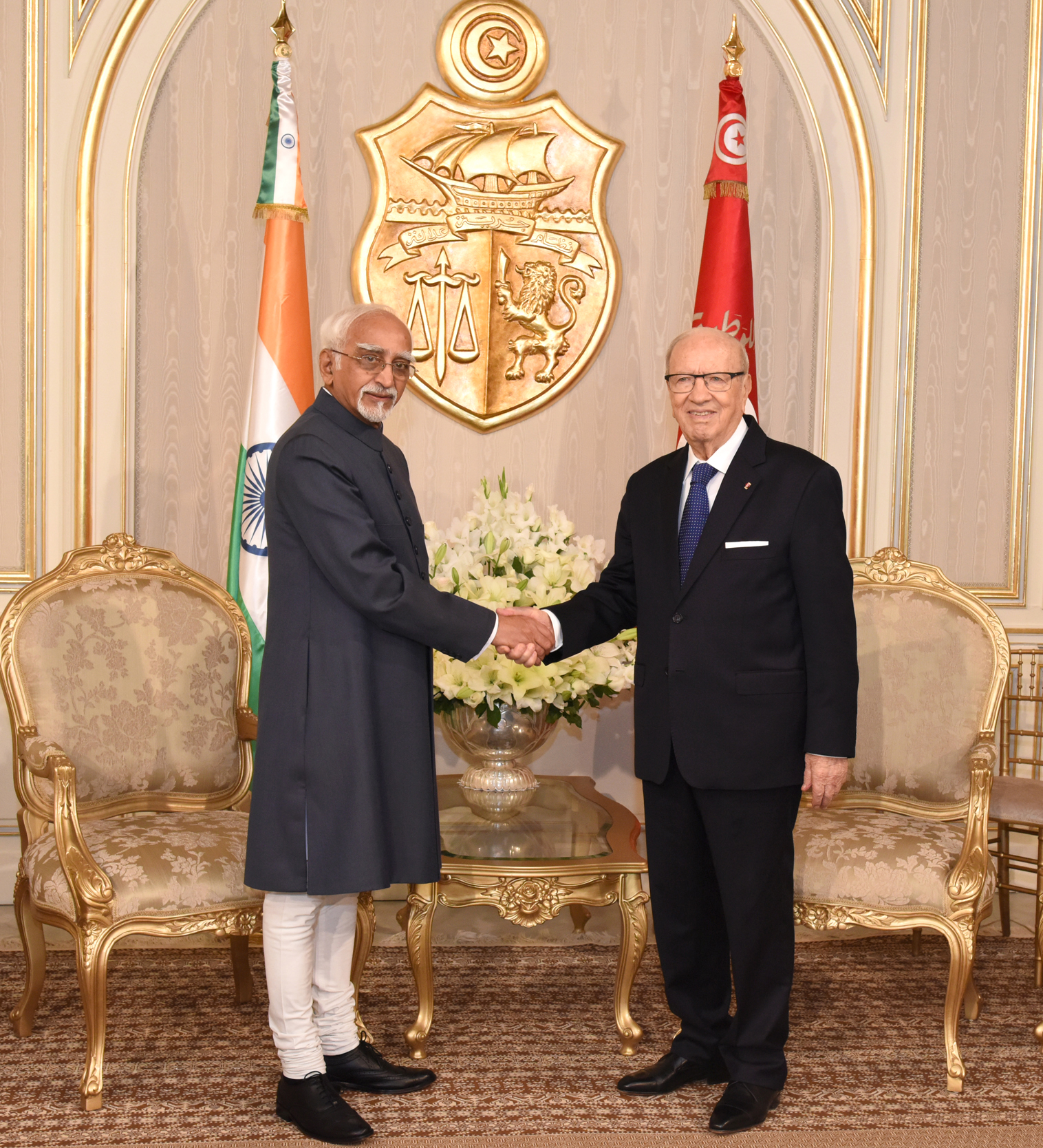
President Essebsi with the Vice President of India, Hamid Ansari, in June 2016.

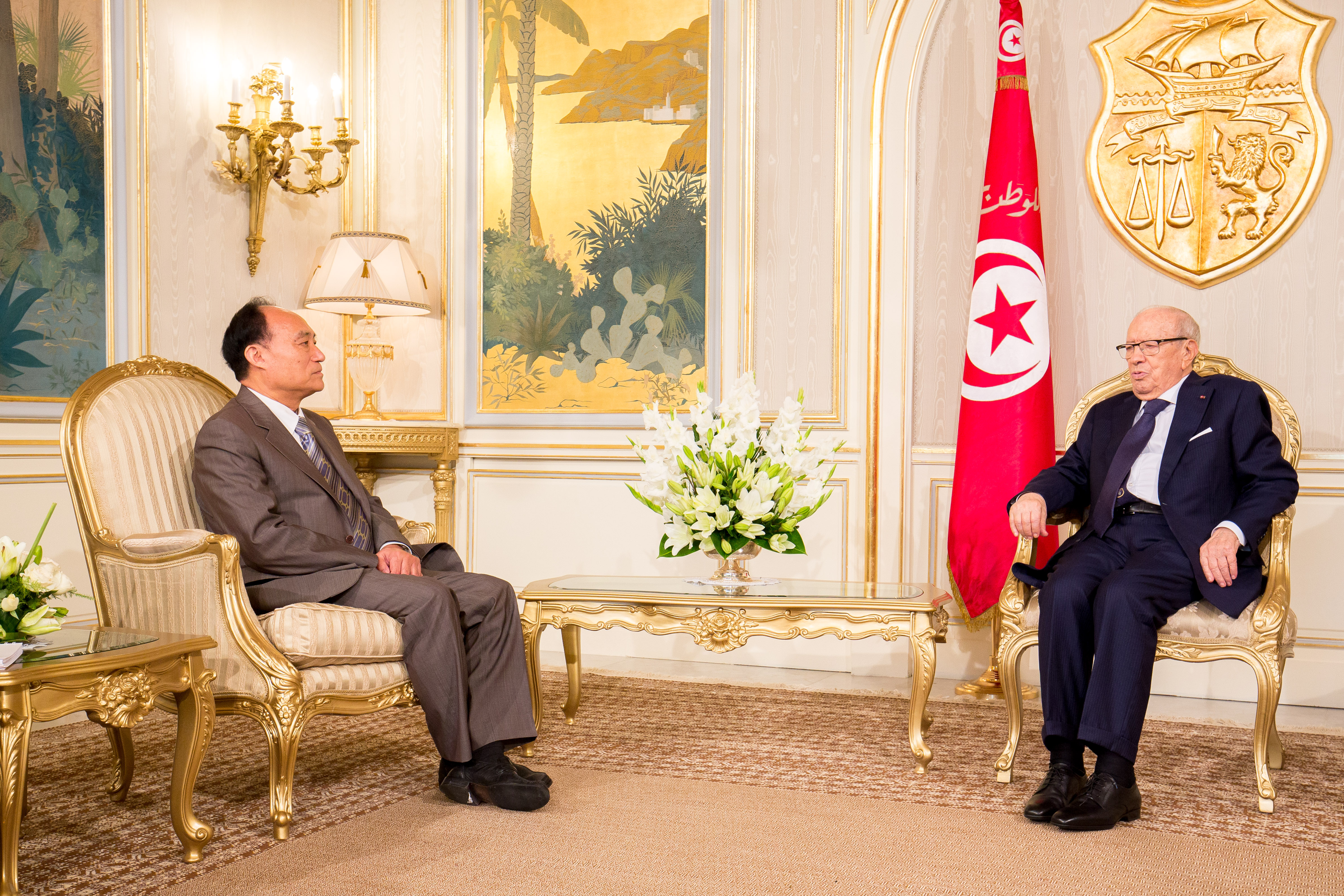
Essebsi with Secretary-General of the ITU Houlin Zhao.

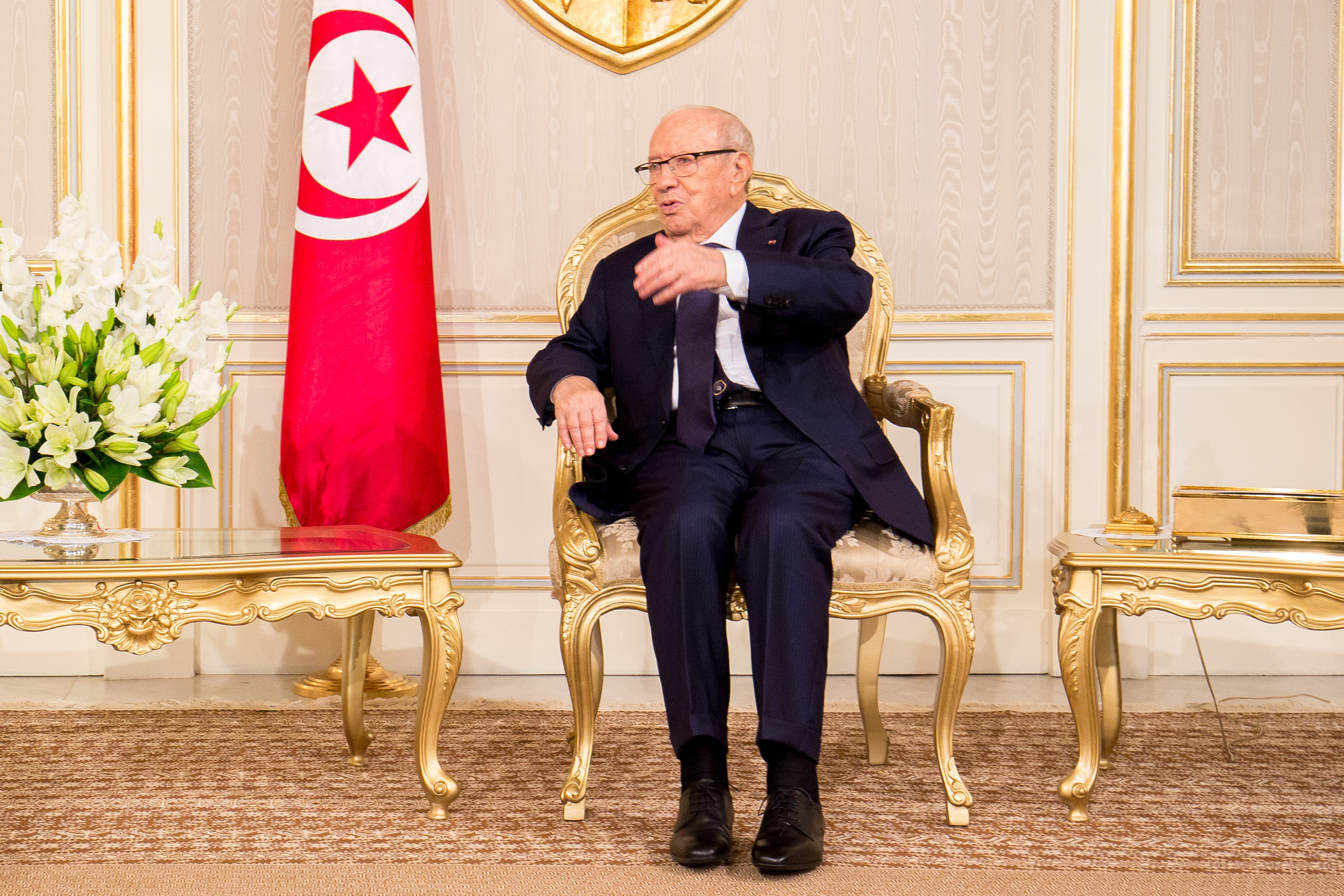
Beji Caid Essebsi at the Carthage Presidential Palace.

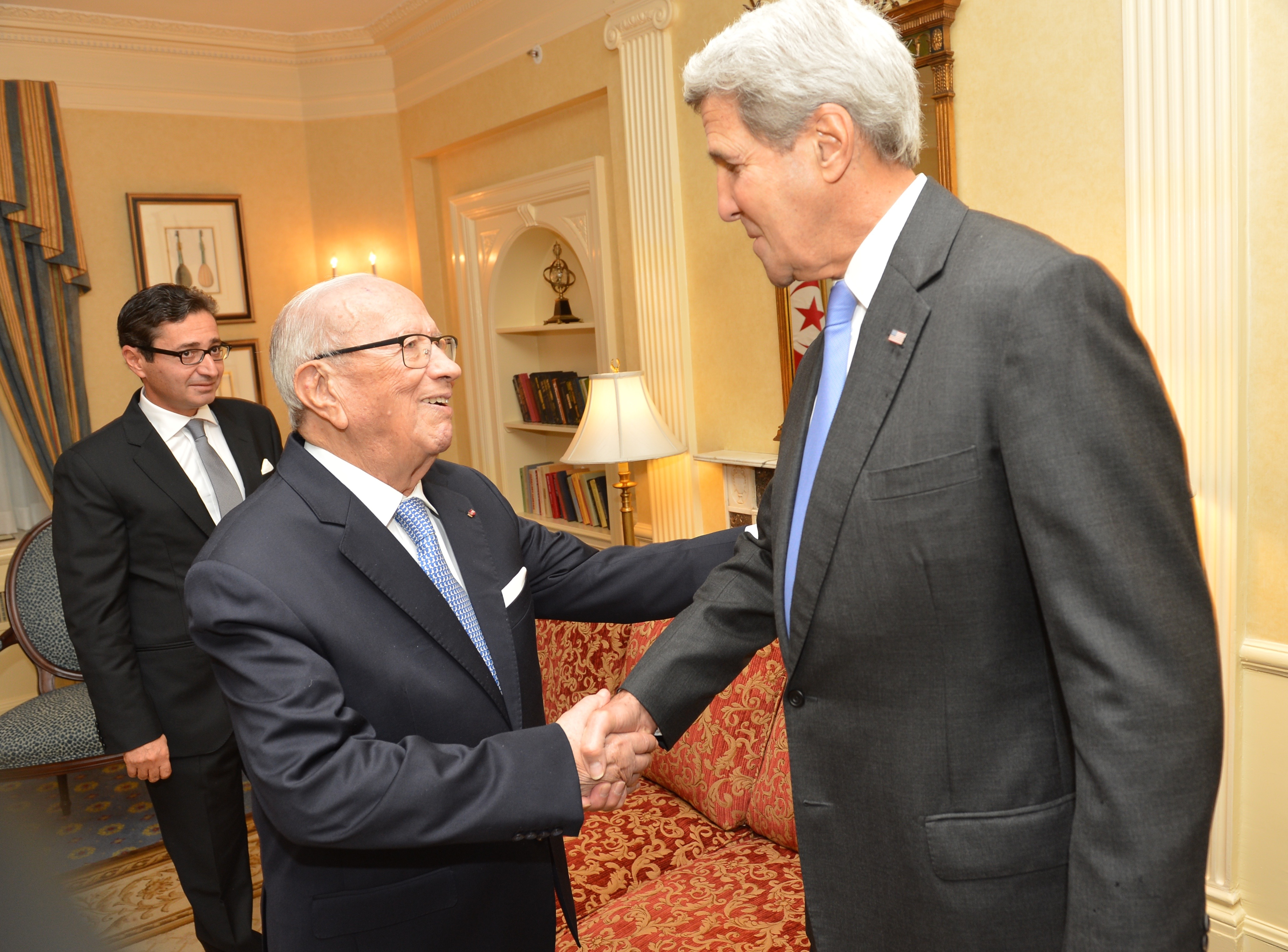
Essebsi with US Secretary of State John Kerry in September 2016 in New York City.

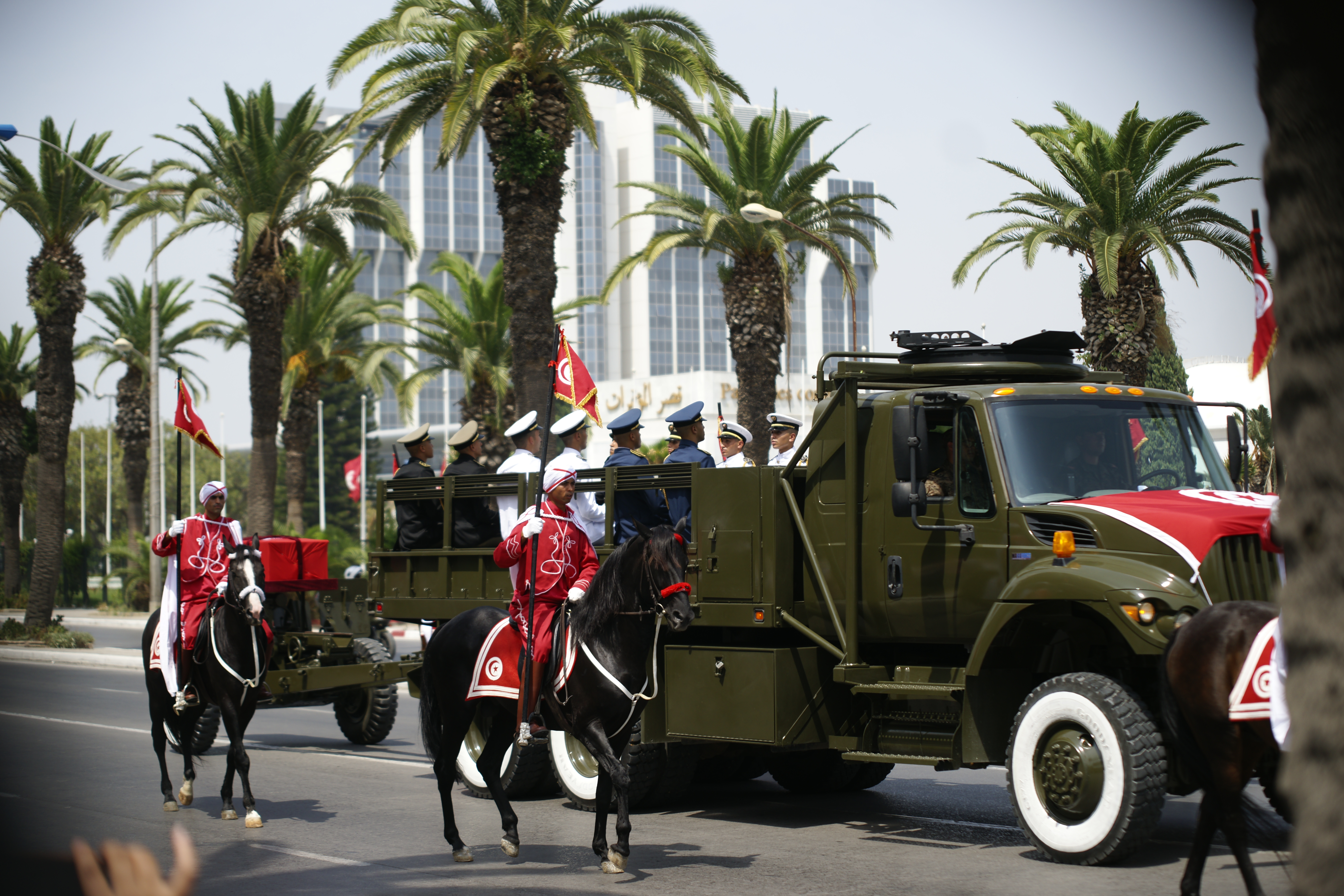
Funeral of Beji Caid Essebsi in 2019.

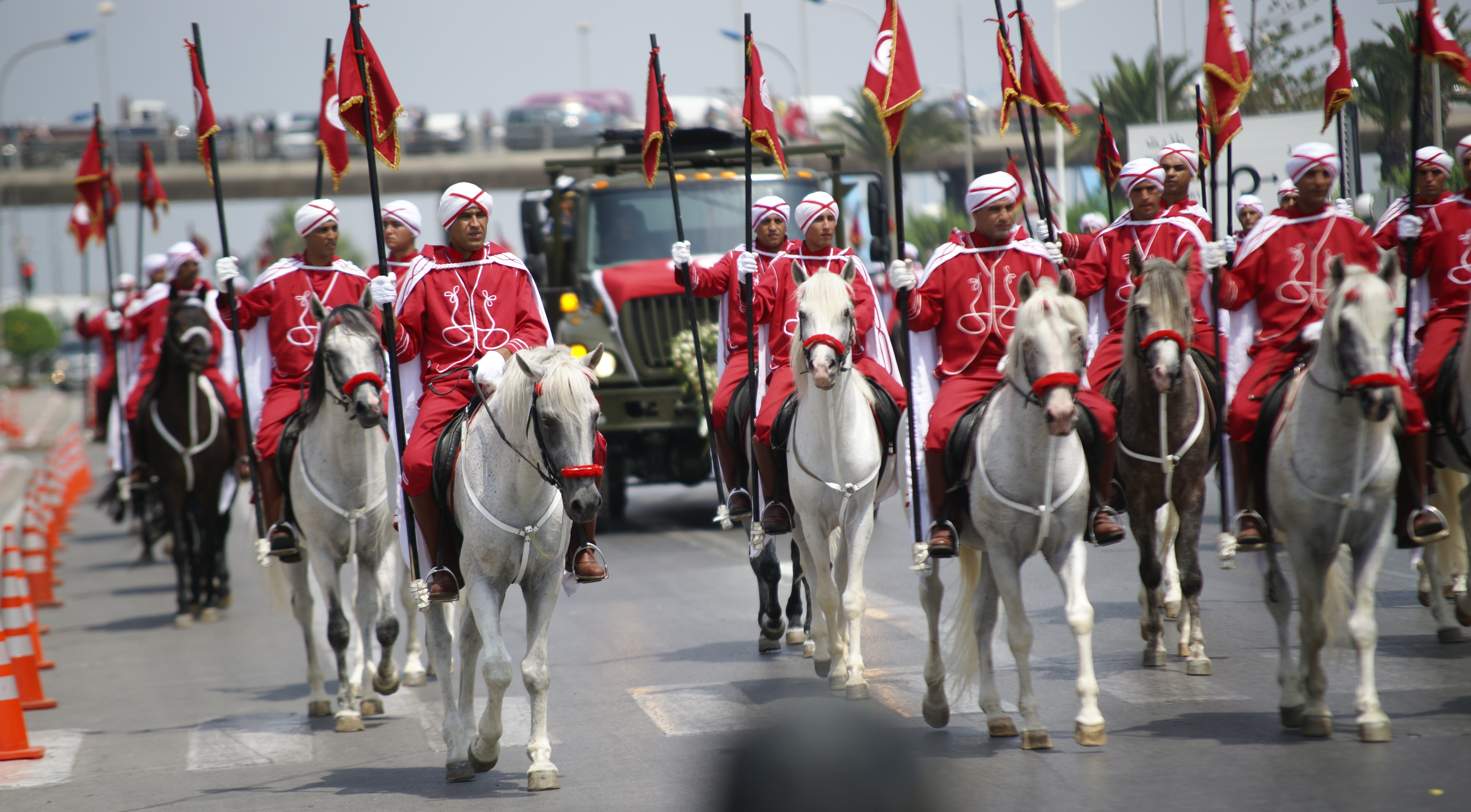
The funeral procession of President Beji Caid Essebsi.

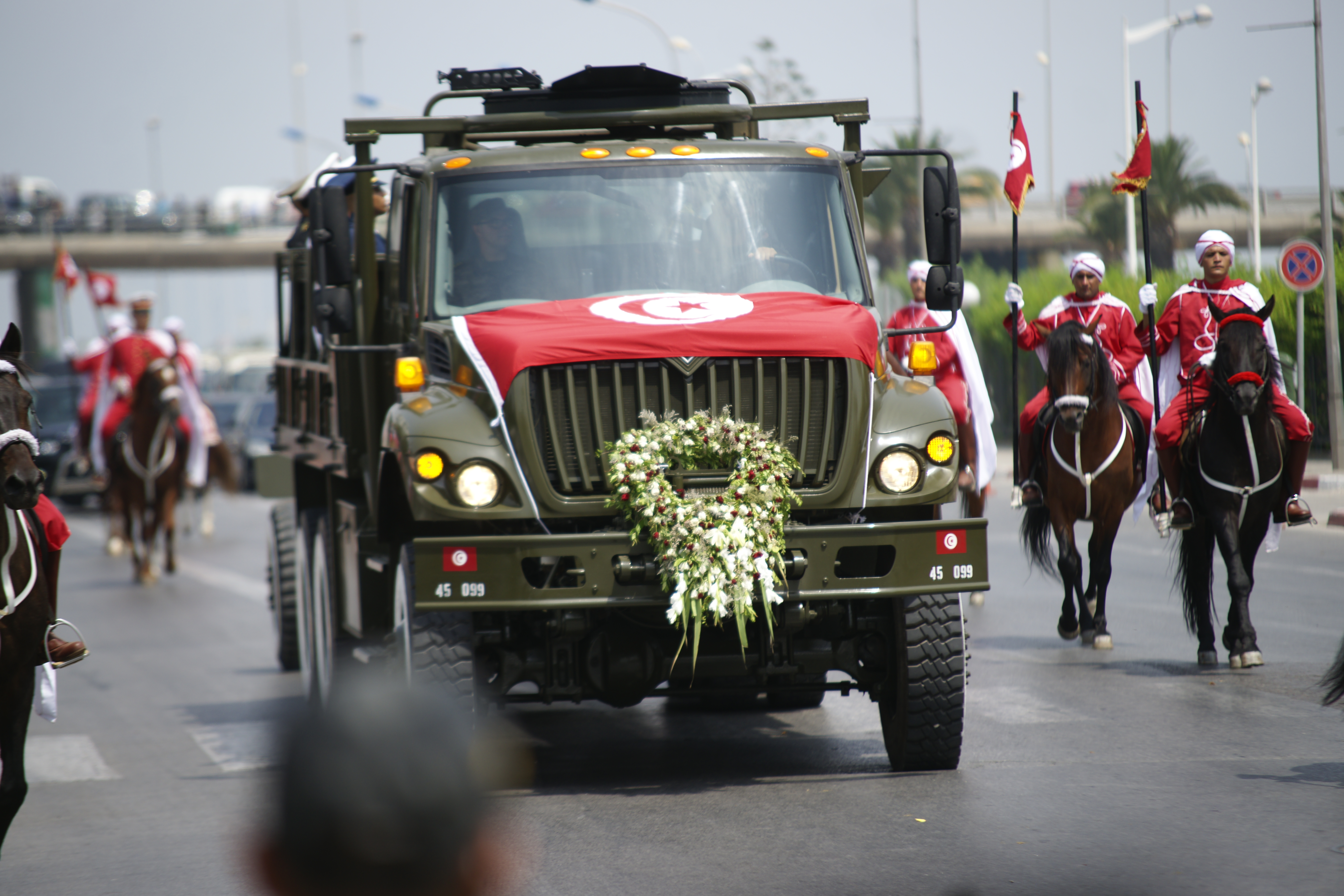
The car transporting Essebsi during his funeral.

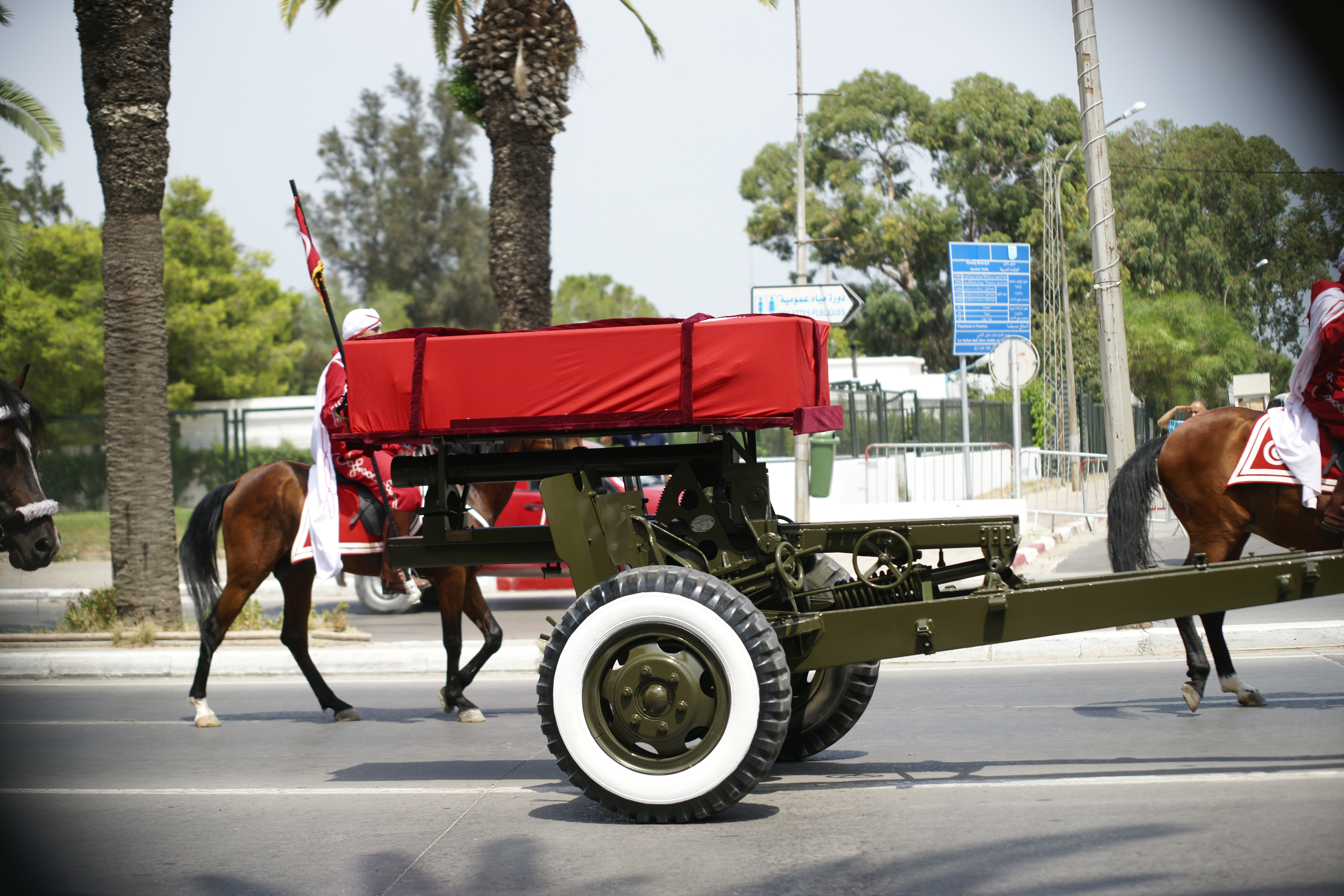
The body of the late Tunisian President Beji Caid Essebsi

Political offices
| Preceded by Taïeb Mhiri | Minister of the Interior; 1965–1969 | Succeeded by Hédi Khefacha |
| Preceded by Mohammed Mzali | Minister of Defence; 1969–1970 | Succeeded by Hassib Ben Ammar |
| Preceded by Hassen Belkhodja | Minister of Foreign Affairs; 1981–1986 | Succeeded by Hédi Mabrouk |
| Preceded by Slaheddine Baly | Speaker of the Chamber of Deputies; 1990–1991 | Succeeded by Habib Boularès |
| Preceded by Mohamed Ghannouchi | Prime Minister of Tunisia; 2011 | Succeeded by Hamadi Jebali |
| Preceded by Moncef Marzouki | President of Tunisia; 2014–2019 | Succeeded by Mohamed Ennaceur; Acting |
Diplomatic posts
| Preceded by Mohamed Masmoudi | Tunisian Ambassador to France; 1970–1971 | Succeeded by Abdesselem Ben Ayed |
Party political offices
| New political party | President of Nidaa Tounes; 2012–2014 | Succeeded by Mohamed Ennaceur; Acting |
