= Abdelfattah Mourou =

Tunisian politician and lawyer

- عبد الفتاح مورو
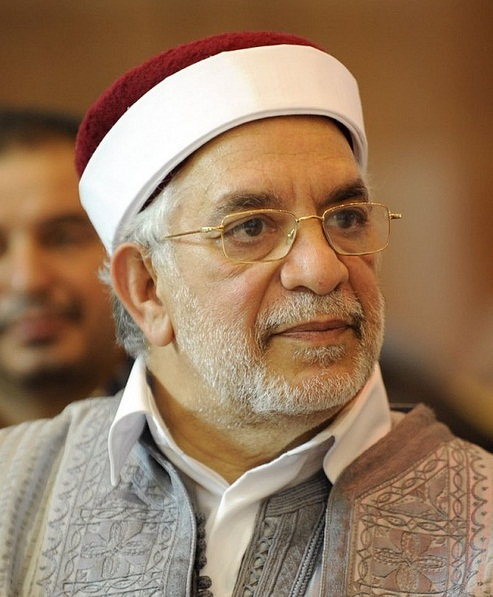
- Mourou in 2014

Acting Speaker of the Assembly of the Representatives of the People
- In office 25 July 2019 – 13 November 2019
- President: Mohamed Ennaceur (acting); Kais Saied
- Prime Minister: Youssef Chahed
- Preceded by: Mohamed Ennaceur
- Succeeded by: Rached Ghannouchi

First Deputy Speaker of the Assembly of the Representatives of the People

Acting
- In office 4 December 2014 – 13 November 2019
- Preceded by: Meherzia Labidi Maïza
- Succeeded by: Samira Chaouachi

Member of the Assembly of the Representatives of the People
- In office 2 December 2014 – 13 November 2019
- Constituency: Tunis II

Personal details
- Born: 1 June 1948 (age 78) Tunis, Tunisia
- Party: Ennahda
- Education: Tunis University
- Profession: Lawyer

Abdelfattah Mourou (Arabic: عبد الفتاح مورو) is a Tunisian former politician and lawyer. He is a co-founder of the Ennahdha Party and served as its Vice-President. He served as First Deputy Speaker of the Assembly of the Representatives of the People from 2014 to 2019.

== Biography ==
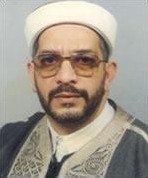
Mourou in the 1980s

At a young age he joined a Sufi order, called Madaniyya, created at the beginning of the twentieth century and originally calling for the rejection of foreign dominance in Tunisia. He began his Islamist activities in the 1960s, preaching in high schools and mosques.

In 1969, he met Rached Ghannouchi in a mosque in Tunis and agreed to found an Islamic movement in Tunisia. In 1973, trying to organize an assembly of a hundred people in Sousse, Mourou, Hmida Ennaifer and Ghannouchi were arrested. Following this incident, they decided to create a clandestine organization (Jamâa Al-Islamiya). It is active mainly in mosques and universities and publishes a newspaper, El Maarifa, freely distributed in kiosks and bookstores close to the organization.

Mourou became a preacher in the capital and the leader of Jamâa Al-Islamiya. In 1981 the group became the Movement of the Islamic trend (Ennahdha) with Mourou as the number two. However, the movement became the target of repression: Mourou was arrested and spent two years in prison. After the attack on the Bab Souika police station in 1991, he was detained again. In 1992, a defamation campaign by the regime aimed to discredit him.

After this detention, Mourou adopted a conciliatory approach. He denounced violence and announced the suspension of his membership in the Ennahdha movement. Mourou ended his political activity and continued to practice law.

On 30 January 2011, following Ghannouchi's return from exile, Mourou hinted that he would resume political activity. Following a call from Youssef al-Qaradawi, Ghannouchi said that Mourou would take charge of his party's election campaign in October 2011. Mourou then confirmed his divorce from the Ennahdha movement and ran in the election as an independent, in the framework of the centrist Independent Democratic Alliance.

At the end of the 2012 Ennahdha Congress, he returned to the Executive Board as Vice President and Personal Representative of President Ghannouchi.

In August 2012, he was violently assaulted by a radical Islamist militant who wounded him slightly on the head.

He was elected to the Assembly of People's Representatives in the elections of 26 October 2014.

On 4 December 2014, he was elected as First Deputy Speaker of the Assembly of the Representatives of the People, receiving 157 votes from the 214 representatives present. After his election, he kissed his only opponent, Mbarka Aouinia Brahmi, the widow of Mohamed Brahmi, on the forehead. Brahmi, nominated by the Popular Front and supported by Afek Tounes, received 33 votes.

On 25 July 2019, following the death of President Béji Caïd Essebsi, he became interim speaker of parliament, after the incumbent, Mohamed Ennaceur, became acting President.

On 6 August, the council of the Shura of Ennahdha nominated Mourou as its presidential candidate.

He retired from politics in 2020.

Mourou speaks Arabic, French and German.
