= Speaker of the Assembly of the Representatives of the People =

The speaker of the Assembly of the Representatives of the People is the presiding officer of the Assembly of the Representatives of the People, the unicameral legislature of Tunisia.

From 1956 to 1959, the Tunisian legislature was called the National Constituent Assembly, from 1959 to 1981 the National Assembly, from 1981 to 2011 the Chamber of Deputies and from 2011 to 2014 the Constituent Assembly. Since 2014, it is called the Assembly of the Representatives of the People.

The Speaker of the Assembly serves as ex officio Vice-President of Tunisia. In the event of the resignation, permanent incapacity or death of the President of the Republic, the speaker of the Assembly ascends as interim president for a minimum of 45 days and a maximum of 90 days, pending new elections.

From the creation of the Chamber of Advisors in 2002 until the Revolution in 2011, the Chamber of Deputies was the lower house of the Parliament of Tunisia.

== List ==
Portrait	Name	Took office	Left office	Political party
Speakers of the National Constituent Assembly
1	Habib Bourguiba الحبيب بورقيبة	9 April 1956	15 April 1956	Neo Destour
2	Jallouli Fares الجلولي فارس	17 April 1956	1 June 1959	Neo Destour
Speakers of the National Assembly
1	Jallouli Fares الجلولي فارس	1 June 1959	1964	Neo Destour
2	Sadok Mokaddem الصادق المقدم	1964	1981	Socialist Destourian Party
Speakers of the Chamber of Deputies
3	Mahmoud Messadi محمود المسعدي	November 1981	13 October 1987	Socialist Destourian Party
4	Rachid Sfar رشيد صفر	13 October 1987	14 October 1988	Socialist Destourian Party
5	Slaheddine Baly صلاح الدين بالي	14 October 1988	14 March 1990	Democratic Constitutional Rally
6	Beji Caid Essebsi الباجي قائد السبسي	14 March 1990	9 October 1991	Democratic Constitutional Rally
7	Habib Boularès الحبيب بولعراس	9 October 1991	14 October 1997	Democratic Constitutional Rally
8	Fouad Mebazaa فؤاد المبزع	14 October 1997	15 January 2011	Democratic Constitutional Rally
—	Sahbi Karoui الصحبي القروي (acting)	15 January 2011	22 November 2011	Independent
Speaker of the Constituent Assembly
1	Mustapha Ben Jafar مصطفى بن جعفر	22 November 2011	2 December 2014	Democratic Forum for Labour and Liberties
Speaker of the Assembly of the Representatives of the People
1	Mohamed Ennaceur محمد الناصر	4 December 2014	25 July 2019	Nidaa Tounes
—	Abdelfattah Mourou عبد الفتاح مورو (acting)	25 July 2019	13 November 2019	Ennahda Movement
2	Rached Ghannouchi راشد الغنوشي	13 November 2019	25 July 2021	Ennahda Movement
Post vacant (25 July 2021 – 13 March 2023)
3	Ibrahim Bouderbala ابراهيم بودربالة	13 March 2023	Incumbent	Independent

== See also ==
- Chamber of Deputies (Tunisia)
- Constituent Assembly of Tunisia
- Assembly of the Representatives of the People
