= Jallouli Fares =

Tunisian politician

- جلولي فارس
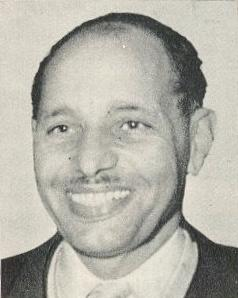
- Fares in 1950

Speaker of the National Assembly of Tunisia
- In office 1 June 1959 – 1964
- Succeeded by: Sadok Mokaddem

Speaker of the Constituent Assembly of Tunisia
- In office 17 April 1956 – 1 June 1959
- Preceded by: Habib Bourguiba

Minister of Education
- In office 17 September 1955 – 15 April 1956
- Monarch: Muhammad VIII
- Prime Minister: Tahar Ben Ammar
- Succeeded by: Lamine Chebbi

Personal details
- Born: 6 March 1909 El Hamma, Tunisia
- Died: 28 October 2001 (aged 92) El Hamma, Tunisia
- Party: Neo Destour

Jallouli Fares (Arabic: جلولي فارس; 6 March 1909 – 28 October 2001) was a politician in Tunisia during its transitions from French colony to monarchy to republic. He was Minister of Education in 1955-56, then Speaker of the Constituent Assembly until 1959, then Speaker of the National Assembly until 1964.

Fares presided over the Constituent Assembly on 25 July 1957 when it announced the abolition of the Tunisian monarchy and the beginning of a republic.

Political offices
Preceded by Habib Bourguiba as Speaker of the Constituent Assembly	Speaker of the Constituent Assembly, then National Assembly; 1956–1964	Succeeded by Sadok Mokaddem
