= Hmida Ennaifer =

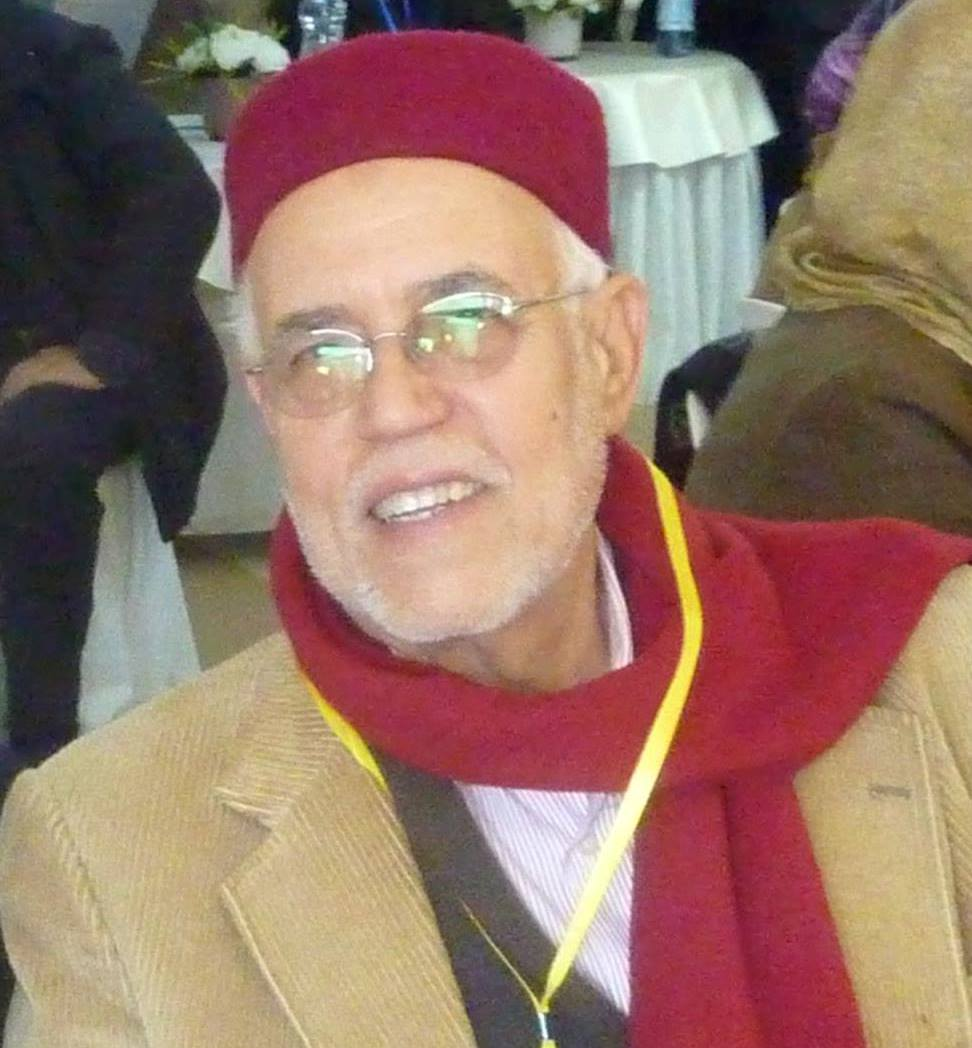
Hmida Ennaifer

Hmida Ennaifer or H'mida Ennaïfar (born 1942) is a Tunisian scholar and theologian.

He was born into an aristocratic family of Tunis, originally from Iraq and settled in Sfax in 1714. He obtained a master's degree in Arabic letters and a Ph.D. from the University of Tunis, Zaytuna and Sorbonne in Paris. In the 1970s, he was very active in Islamic circles in Tunis and provided a Friday sermon in the mosque in Halfaouine M'hamed Bey. He and Rached Ghannouchi and Abdelfattah Mourou, leaders of the Islamist movement in Tunisia, gave birth to the Movement of Islamic trend in 1981.

From 1981 to 2004, he was professor of theology at the University of Ez-Zitouna. In 1982, he founded the cultural magazine Tunisian 15/21 and remained its director until 1991. He was also a founding member of the Al-Jahiz Cultural Forum in Tunis.

In 1985, he joined the Islamo-Christian Research Group (GRIC). From 1989 to 1991, he also carried the responsibility for advising the Ministerial National Education and Religious Affairs in Tunisia. Since December 2005, he served as co-chairman of GRIC.
