= Sahbi Karoui =

Tunisian politician

Sahbi Karoui is a member of the African Union's Pan-African Parliament representing Tunisia. Fouad Mebazaa who succeeded the interim President Mohamed Ghannouchi as acting President temporarily left the office of the Speaker of the Assembly of the Representatives of the People on the 15 January 2011 to Karoui, leaving the office to his vice Sahbi Karoui for his first meeting that was held on 4 February 2011 as interim.

== See also ==
List of members of the Pan-African Parliament

Political offices
Preceded by Fouad Mebazaa	Speaker of the Chamber of Deputies; Acting; 2011	Succeeded by Mustapha Ben Jafar as Speaker of the Constituent Assembly
