= Chamber of Deputies (Tunisia) =

Chamber of Deputies مجلس النواب Majlis an-Nuwwāb
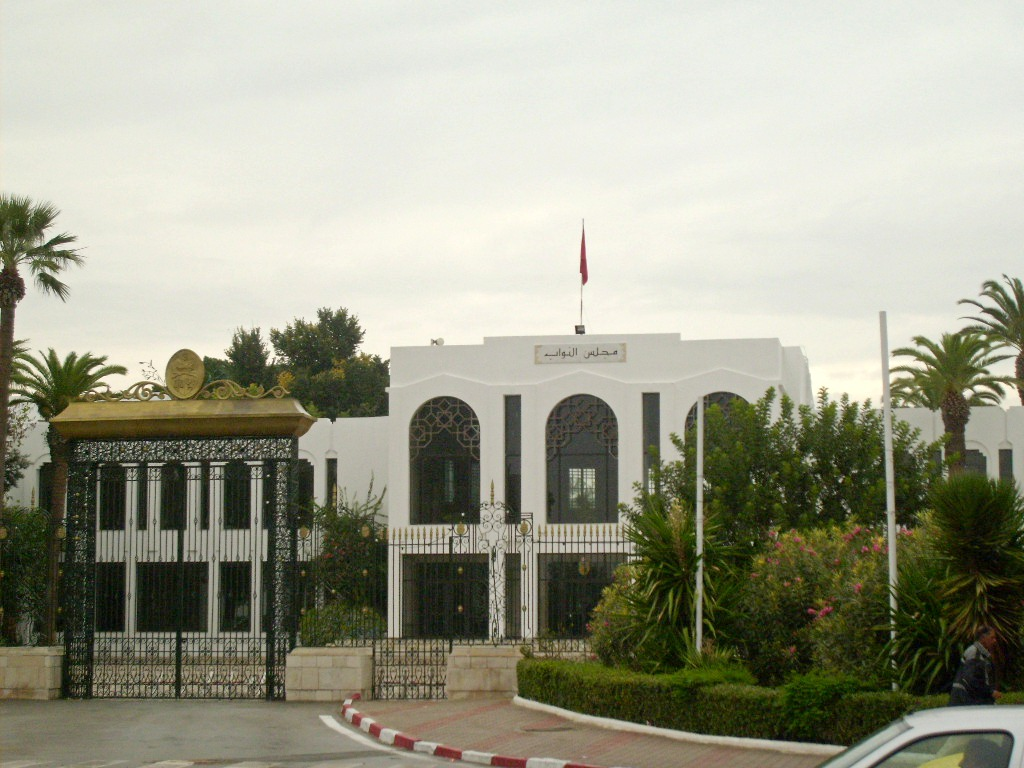

Type
- Type: Lower house of the Parliament of Tunisia

Leadership
- President: Sahbi Karoui (a. i.)

Website
- www.chambre-dep.tn

The Chamber of Deputies (Arabic: مجلس النواب Majlis an-Nuwwāb, French: Chambre des députés) was the lower chamber of the Parliament of Tunisia, the bicameral legislative branch of the government of Tunisia. It had 214 seats and members are elected by popular vote to serve five-year terms. 20% of the seats are reserved for the opposition. Elections are held in the last 30 days of each five-year term. To be eligible for office, one must be a voter with a Tunisian mother or father and be at least 23 years old the day candidacy is announced. The last election to the Chamber of Deputies was held in October 2009.

Under the original Tunisian constitution, the Chamber of Deputies theoretically possessed great lawmaking powers, and even had the right to censure the government by a two-thirds majority. In practice, the body was dominated by the Democratic Constitutional Rally (formerly the Neo-Destour Party and Socialist Destour Party) from independence until the 2011 Tunisian revolution. The Neo-Destour won every seat in the Chamber at the first elections in 1959. From then on, Tunisia was effectively a one-party state, even though opposition parties nominally remained legal until 1963. Even after opposition parties were legalized again in 1981, they did not manage to enter the Chamber of Deputies until 1994. Even then, in the five elections held before the overthrow of President Zine El Abidine Ben Ali in 2011, they never accounted for more than 19 percent of the total seats in the chamber. During the last few years of Ben Ali's tenure, the chamber took an increased role in debating national policy. However, all legislation still originated with the president, and there was little meaningful opposition to presidential decisions.

After the Tunisian Revolution of 2011, the Chamber of Deputies was replaced by the Assembly of the Representatives of the People as Tunisia's legislature.

== See also ==
- President of the Chamber of Deputies of Tunisia
