= Habib Boularès =

Tunisian diplomat and politician

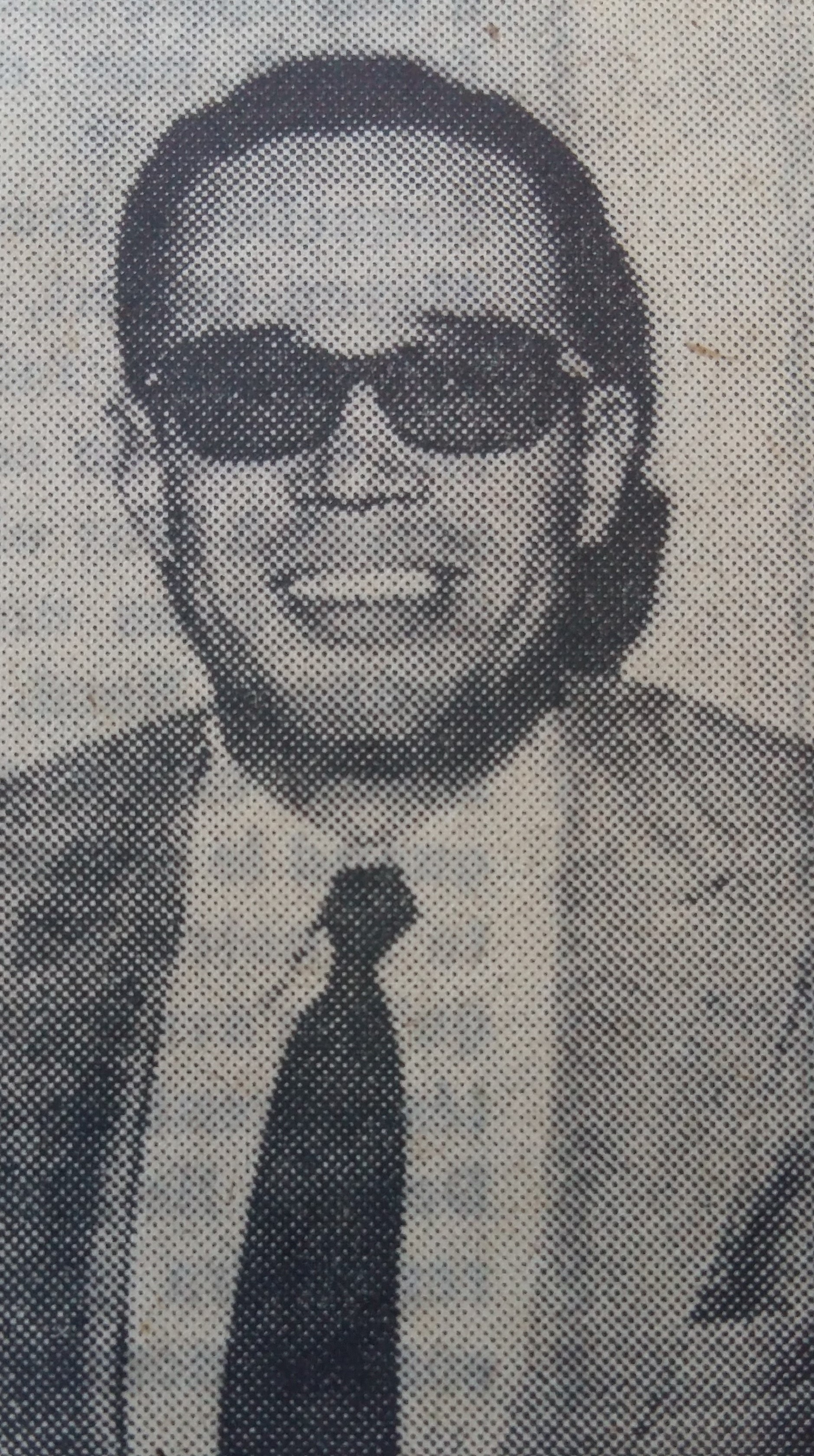
Habib Boularès

Habib Boularès (Arabic: الحبيب بولعراس, romanized: al-Ḥabīb Bū al-Aʻrās) (29 July 1933 – 18 April 2014) was a Tunisian diplomat and politician.

== Biography ==
He first entered the cabinet in 1970 as Minister of Culture and Information, serving in that post until 1971. He served as the Minister of Foreign Affairs of Tunisia from 1990 to 1991, Minister of Defense for a brief period in 1991, and as Speaker Chamber of Deputies from 1991 to 1997. He served as Secretary-General of the Arab-Maghreb Union from 2002 to 2006, and was succeeded by Habib Ben Yahia.

== Personal life ==
Boularès died on April 18, 2014, in Paris at the age 80, following a long illness. His funeral took place on April 23 at the Sidi Abdelaziz cemetery in La Marsa.
