= Tunisian Constitution of 2022 =

Current national constitution

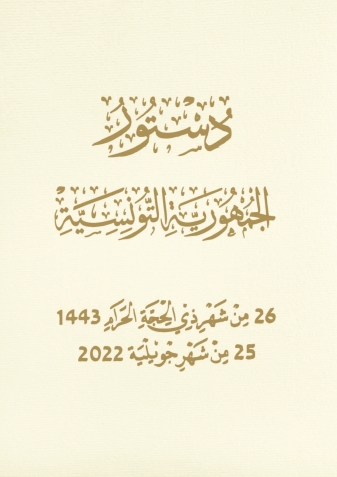
- The outer cover of the Constitution of the Republic of Tunisia, showing dates in the Hijri and Gregorian calendars
- Created: 30 June 2022
- Ratified: 25 July 2022
- Date effective: 16 August 2022
- Location: Tunisia
- Author: Constitution Drafting Committee
- Signatories: Kais Saied, President of the Republic
- Purpose: To replace the Tunisian Constitution of 2014

The Constitution of the Republic of Tunisia 2022, or the Third Republic Constitution, is the current constitution of Tunisia that was adopted in Tunisia on 25 July 2022 after the voters approved the constitutional referendum that was held on the same day.

As the country's supreme legal standard, it constitutes the fourth Constitution of the country's modern history after the 1861 Constitution, the 1959 Constitution and the 2014 Constitution. The Constitution entered into force on 16 August 2022.

== History ==
On 25 July 2021, the day commemorating the declaration of the Republic, following several months of tensions between President Kais Saied and members of the Assembly of the Representatives of the People, thousands of demonstrators demanded the dissolution of the parliament and a change of government. These gatherings were concurrent with the COVID-19 pandemic.

On the same evening, and based on Article 80 of the 2014 Constitution, Kais Saied dismissed the Mechichi Cabinet by immediate order, including Hichem Mechichi from his duties as Prime Minister and Acting Minister of the Interior, freezed the activity of the Assembly of the Representatives of the People Representatives, lifted the immunity of its members, and formed a new government that will be accountable to solely to him. Ennahdha immediately denounced the dismissal of the cabinet and dissolution of the Assembly, describing the president's actions as a coup. From 15 January to 20 March 2022, an election via electronic voting was held on the reforms to be proposed in anticipation of a referendum. The vote resulted in an endorsement of a presidential system and of informal majority voting for legislative elections.

On 1 June 2022, a decree-law was signed amending the Basic Law on Elections and Referendums. The Independent High Authority for Elections became responsible for maintaining an “accurate, transparent, complete and up-to-date” voter register that voters can consult to request updating their registration. In addition, the Independent High Authority for Elections was instructed to proceed with the automatic registration of all unregistered voters by distributing them to the polling stations closest to their place of residence. It also was required to publish a list of participants in the constitutional referendum campaign after submitting data that the Independent High Electoral Commission could reject with a reasoned decision. The date of the referendum on the constitution was set for 25 July 2022, despite criticism from the opposition.

== Content ==
At the beginning of June 2022, the jurist Sadok Belaïd, president of the advisory commission for drafting the new Constitution, indicated that he would submit the preliminary draft on 15 June to the Head of State, and that it would not contain any reference to Islam, unlike the Constitutions of 1959 and 2014. This is, however, ambiguous as to whether it deals with the country or the State. The text, unveiled on 30 June, establishes a presidential system and a bicameral parliament. The Assembly of the Representatives of the People is elected by universal suffrage, while the National Council of Regions and Districts is elected indirectly by the regional councils.

Bills tabled by the president are examined with priority. The president appoints the government without needing a vote of confidence from Parliament. For a motion of censure to be adopted, it must be voted for by two-thirds of the members of both houses of Parliament combined. Dual nationals can no longer be presidential candidates.

The president of the Constitutional Court is responsible for the presidential interim. MPs can be dismissed and an MP must not table a bill if he is a budget-eater. The president also appoints members of the Constitutional Court and Tunisia is described as a member of the "Islamic ummah" and the "State alone must work to achieve the goals of Islam." On 3 July, Belaïd announced that the text submitted to the referendum was not the one developed and presented by the commission, adding that it contained "considerable risks and failures." The Constitution can be reformed at the initiative of the president or a third of the deputies. The September 2021 decree will remain valid until the election of a new Parliament.

The Superior Council of the Judiciary is abolished and replaced by three councils for each of the three judicial orders. Regarding article 5 which is modified compared to its preliminary draft, Belaïd denounces a risk of "reconstruction of the power of religious people" and a "return to the dark ages of Islamic civilization". The President of the Republic recognized on 8 July that errors had been made and announced that he would make corrections and clarifications to the draft Constitution which were published the same evening in the Official Gazette of the Republic of Tunisia (JORT). Among the modifications made, the expression "within the framework of a democratic system" is added to article 5 in order to attenuate that of "the principles of Islam", as well as the allusion to "good morals" for limit freedoms which is withdrawn. The text published in JORT on August 17 includes modifications compared to the version submitted to the vote.

== Articles ==
The Constitution consists of 142 articles, divided into eleven chapters.

Chapters and Articles
Introduction
Introduction to the Constitution
Chapter I: General Provisions
1 · 2 · 3 · 4 · 5 · 6 · 7 · 8 · 9 · 10 · 11 · 12 · 13 · 14 · 15 · 16 · 17 · 18 · 19 · 20 · 21
Chapter II: Rights and freedoms
22 · 23 · 24 · 25 · 26 · 27 · 28 · 29 · 30 · 31 · 32 · 33 · 34 · 35 · 36 · 37 · 38 · 39 · 40 · 41 · 42 · 43 · 44 · 45 · 46 · 47 · 48 · 49 · 50 · 51 · 52 · 53 · 54 · 55
Chapter III: Legislative function
56 · 57

First section: Assembly of the Representatives of the People
58 · 59 · 60 · 61 · 62 · 63 · 64 · 65 · 66 · 67 · 68 · 69 · 70 · 71 · 72 · 73 · 74 · 75 · 76 · 77 · 78 · 79 · 80

Second section: National Council of Regions and Districts
81 · 82 · 83 · 84 · 85 · 86
Chapter IV: Executive function
87

First section: President of the Republic
88 · 89 · 90 · 91 · 92 · 93 · 94 · 95 · 96 · 97 · 98 · 99 · 100 · 101 · 102 · 103 · 104 · 105 · 106 · 107 · 108 · 109 · 110

Second section: Government
111 · 112 · 113 · 114 · 115 · 116
Chapter V: Judicial function
117 · 118 · 119 · 120 · 121 · 122 · 123 · 124
Chapter VI: Constitutional Court
125 · 126 · 127 · 128 · 129 · 130 · 131 · 132
Chapter VII: Local and regional groups
133
Chapter VIII: Independent High Authority for Elections
134
Chapter IX: The Supreme Council for Education
135
Chapter X: Revising the constitution
136 · 137 · 138
Chapter XI: Transitional and final provisions
139 · 140 · 141 · 142

== See also ==
- Constitution of Tunisia
- 2021 Tunisian self-coup
- 2022 Tunisian constitutional referendum
