= 2022 Tunisian constitutional referendum =

- 25 July 2022
- Do you support the new draft constitution for the Tunisian republic?
- The official logo of the Tunisian constitutional referendum 2022
- Website: www.isie.tn

Results
Choice	Votes	%
Yes	2,607,884	94.60%
No	148,723	5.40%
Valid votes	2,756,607	97.40%
Invalid or blank votes	73,487	2.60%
Total votes	2,830,094	100.00%
Registered voters/turnout	9,278,541	30.5%
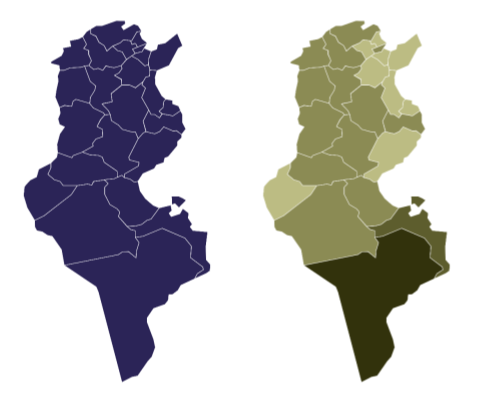
Governate results of valid votes (left) and turnout (right)
Yes
90–100%
Turnout
30–40%
20–30%
10–20%
0–10%

A constitutional referendum was held in Tunisia on 25 July 2022 by the Independent High Authority for Elections. The referendum was supported by the Tunisian president, Kais Saied, one year into a political crisis that began on 25 July 2021. The referendum was preceded by an electronic consultation regarding the nature of the political system and the method of voting in legislative elections. It was boycotted by many of Tunisia's largest political parties.

The question on the ballot was: "Do you support the new draft constitution for the Tunisian republic?" Preliminary results were announced from 26 July to 28 July, and the final results—95 percent in favor of the new constitution and 5 percent opposed—were announced on 28 August 2022 after all appeals were considered. Turnout was low, at only 31%. The newly drafted constitution turned Tunisia's semi-presidential system into a presidential system, centralizing the power of the president and adding powers while largely limiting the role of the Tunisian parliament.

== Background ==
=== Previous constitution ===
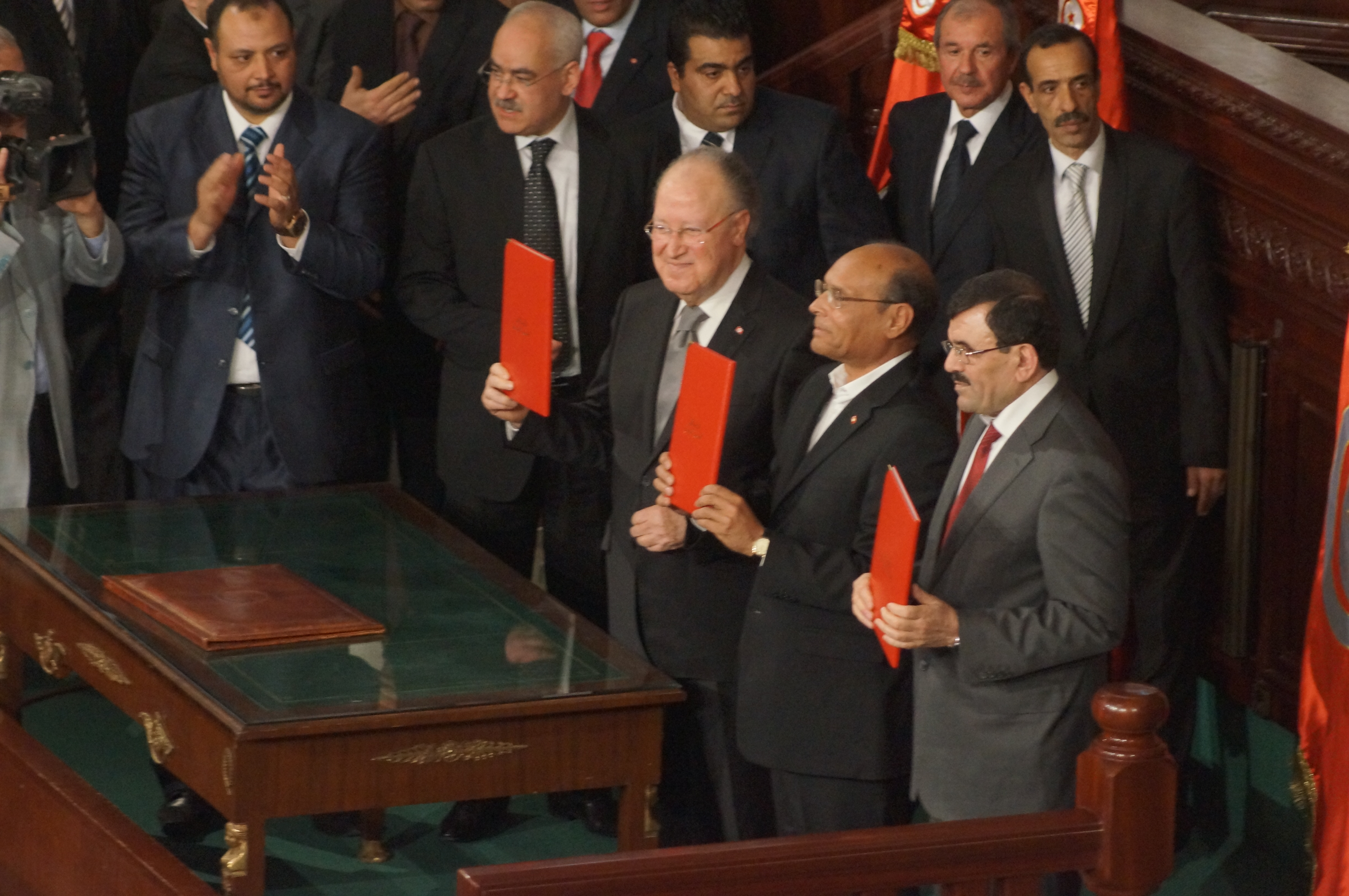
Signature of the Tunisian Constitution of 2014 by Mustapha Ben Jafar, Moncef Marzouki and Ali Laarayedh.

In early 2013, the national Constituent Assembly was tasked with drafting and adopting a new constitution within one year of its election. A preliminary draft was published soon after, but its articles were debated one at a time in sessions in December 2013 and January 2014, significantly delaying their final examination. The final text was adopted on 26 January 2014 by the Constituent Assembly with 200 votes for, 12 against, and 4 abstentions. The following day, the text was signed by President of the Republic Moncef Marzouki, President of the Constituent Assembly Mustapha Ben Jafar, and Head of Government Ali Laarayedh during a ceremony at the Assembly's headquarters.

The final constitution was the result of a compromise between the ruling Islamist party Ennahda and opposition forces. Frightened by the military coup in Egypt that led to the fall of Muslim Brotherhood-affiliated President Mohamed Morsi—and under pressure from the Tunisian Human Rights League, the Bar Association, and trade unions—Ennahda agreed to engage in a dialogue with the opposition forces after September 2013.

As a result of a compromise between those in favor of a classic parliamentary system and those in favor of a semi-presidential system more favorable to the head of state, executive power was shared between the President of the Republic and the Head of Government. The constitution granted only limited recognition to Islam and established the goal of gender equality in elected assemblies.

=== Background ===
As a result of the highly fractured parliament from the 2019 Tunisian parliamentary election—which saw the largest party, Ennahda, receive less than half of the 109 seats required for a legislative majority—a coalition was formed in February 2020 of five parties and several independents, with Elyes Fakhfakh as Prime Minister. Only five months later, in July, the coalition collapsed when Ennahda withdrew following a conflict with Prime Minister Fakhfakh. A new cabinet of mostly technocrats was then formed under Hichem Mechichi.

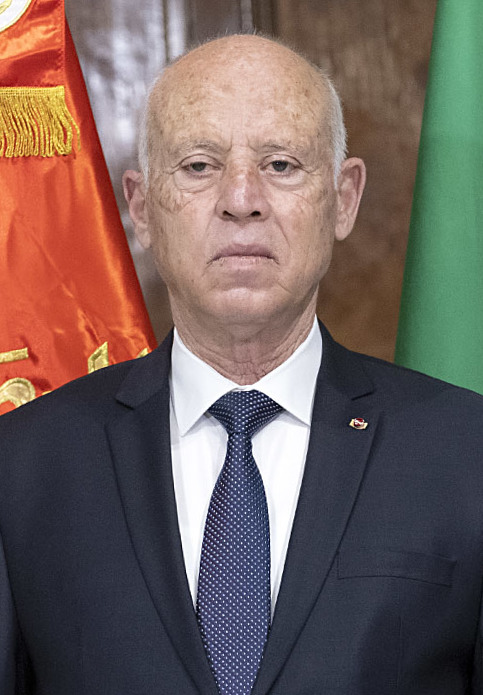
Kais Saied in June 2021.

On 25 July 2021, upon the collapse of the coalition government, violent demonstrations against the government took place across Tunisia to demand that basic services be provided amid the growing COVID-19 outbreak, the dissolution of the Assembly of the Representatives of the People, and a change of regime. In response to the protests and threats on his power, President Saied suspended the Assembly for thirty days, relieved Prime Minister Mechichi of his duties, waived the immunity of Assembly members, closed the offices of various foreign news agencies, and ordered the military to close the Assembly house. Saied's actions were widely seen, both nationally and internationally, as those of a coup d'etat. His actions directly disregarded Article 80 of the Tunisian constitution, which stated that the Assembly could not be suspended and that before declaring a state of emergency, the president was required to consult his prime minister and the head of the Assembly. At the time, there was no constitutional court in the nation to assess the legality of Saied's interpretation of the constitution.

On 29 September, President Saied instructed Prime Minister Najla Bouden to form a new government. From 15 January to 20 March 2022, an electronic consultation was conducted on the reforms to be proposed in anticipation of the referendum. During the consultation, which had very low turnout, the options of a transition to a presidential system and to a uninominal majority ballot for legislative elections received the most support. On 30 March 2022, 120 deputies under the chairmanship of the second vice president of the Assembly, Tarek Fetiti, met in a virtual session to vote to end the exceptional measures in force since 25 July. That same day, President Saied dissolved the Assembly, against constitutional procedure, and threatened the deputies with legal proceedings. About one month later, on 22 April 2022, President Saied passed a decree-law that assigned to the President of the Republic the responsibility of appointing the seven members and spokesperson of the national election committee, the Independent High Authority for Elections (ISIE). A former president of the ISIE, Nabil Bafoun, criticized this law as undermining the independence of the ISIE in violation of international standards.

On 1 June 2022, another decree-law was signed, modifying much of the law relating to elections and referendums. Per the new law, the ISIE became responsible for maintaining voter registration that would be "accurate, transparent, complete and up-to-date". Upon the passing of this law, a constitutional referendum was announced for 25 July 2022, despite criticism from the opposition, in order to make Saied's changes official.

== Contents ==
At the beginning of June 2022, the jurist Sadok Belaïd, the president of the advisory committee for drafting the new constitution, indicated that he would submit the preliminary draft to the head of state on 15 June, and that it did not contain any reference to Islam, unlike the constitutions of 1959 and 2014.

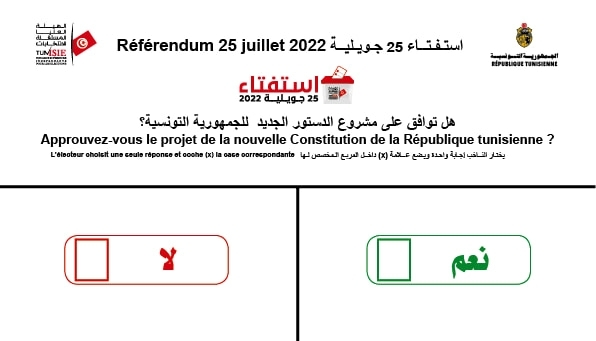
Referendum ballot.

The text, unveiled on 30 June, established a presidential regime and a bicameral parliament. Bills tabled by the president would be given priority consideration. The president would appoint the government without needing a vote of confidence from the Assembly. For a motion of censure to be adopted, it would have to be voted on by two-thirds of the members of the two chambers of the Assembly. Binationals could no longer be presidential candidates. The president would appoint the members of the Constitutional Court. The constitution could be reformed on the initiative of the president or of one-third of the deputies. The decree of September 2021 would remain valid until the election of a new Assembly.

The draft described Tunisia as a member of the "Islamic Ummah" and said the "State alone must work for the realization of the purposes of Islam". On 3 July, Belaïd announced that the text submitted for the referendum was not the one drawn up and presented by the commission, adding that it contained "considerable risks and shortcomings".

The Superior Council of the Judiciary was abolished and replaced by three councils for each of the three judicial orders. On the subject of Article 5, which was modified from the preliminary draft, Belaïd denounced a risk of "reconstruction of the power of the religious" and a "return to the dark ages of Islamic civilization". The President of the Republic said on 8 July that errors had been made and announced that he would make corrections and clarifications to the draft constitution, which were published the same evening in the Official Gazette of the Republic of Tunisia. Among the changes made, the phrase "within the framework of a democratic system" was added to Article 5 in order to mitigate that of the "principles of Islam", and the allusion to "good morals" present in the draft text was expunged.

== Campaign ==
=== Procedure ===
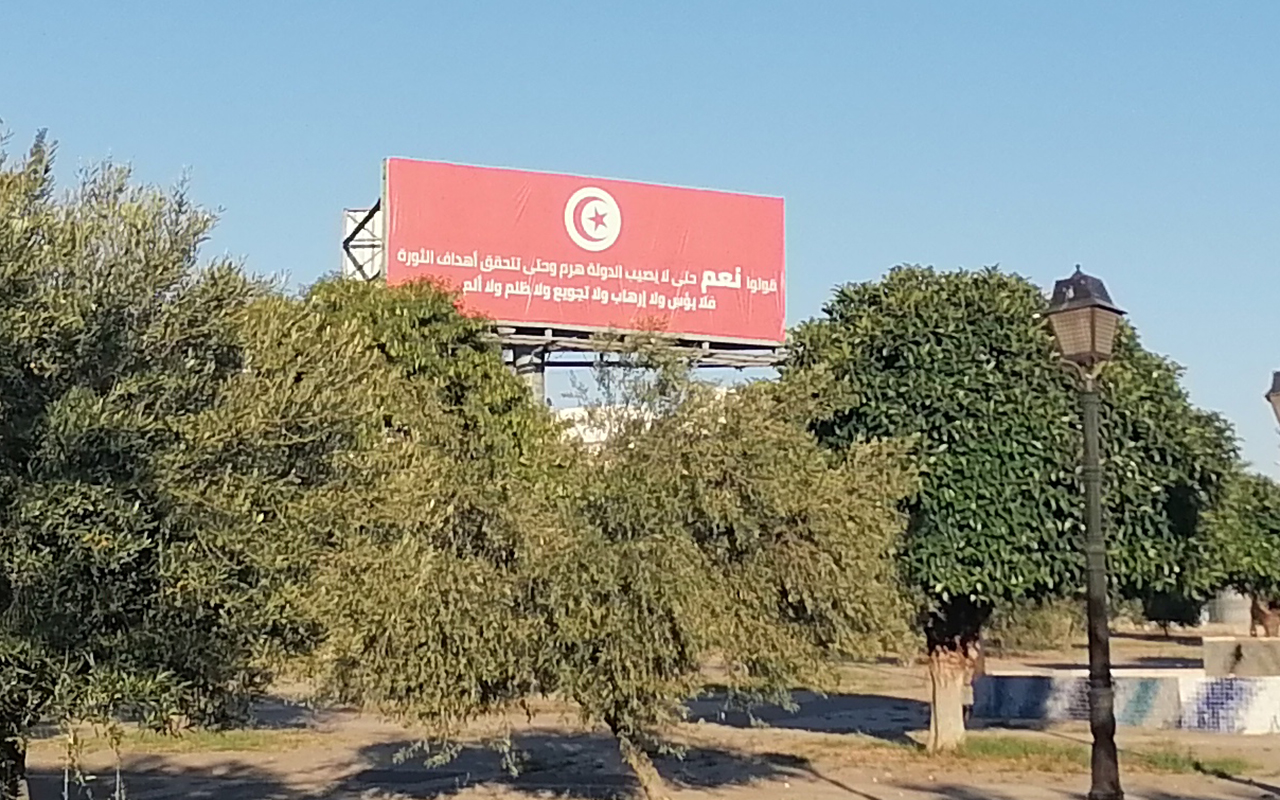
Billboard for the "yes" campaign including the Tunisian flag.

The Independent High Authority for Elections (ISIE), responsible for organizing the referendum, announced that the referendum campaign would take place from 3 July to 23 July 2022. The preliminary results were announced from 26 to 28 July, and the final results were announced on 28 August after consideration of all appeals.

On 29 June 2022, the ISIE published the list of participants who were accredited for the referendum campaign. This list of 161 participants was made up of 26 organizations—the Tunisian General Labour Union (UGTT), the Soumoud coalition, and 24 parties and coalitions including Afek Tounes, the People's Movement, Tunisia Forward, and the Republican People's Union—and 111 individuals. The final list containing the position of each party was published on 6 July 2022 and included only 148 participants, some (such as the UGTT) having not given clear voting instructions and others (including the Arraya Al Wataniya party) having withdrawn from the campaign. After the publication of the decree of 8 July correcting errors in the draft constitution, the ISIE gave participants until 12 July to change their position concerning the vote.

=== Controversies ===
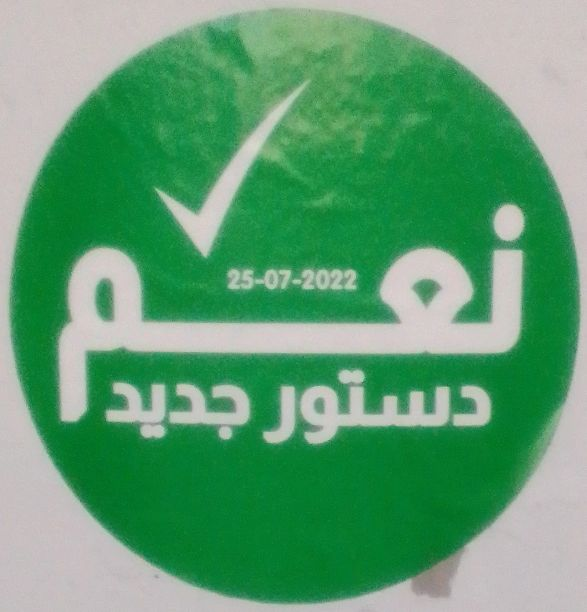
The "Yes" campaign poster went viral across the country weeks before the referendum day.

On 5 July 2022, President of the Republic Kais Saied published a letter in which he called for voting "Yes" to the draft constitution. Article 116, added to the electoral law by the decree-law of 1 June 2022, stipulated that "to participate in the referendum campaign, a declaration to this effect must be filed with the Authority" which "fixes the list of participants". The list published on 28 June 2022 did not include Saied's name, and he therefore should not have been able to participate. On 12 July 2022, following the appearance of electoral posters for the "Yes" campaign including the Tunisian flag, the ISIE reiterated that this was prohibited in accordance with Article 61 of the electoral law—which also prohibited the use of public funds and resources during the referendum campaign—and said that fines would be imposed on offenders. Despite the ISIE's warning, some billboards containing the Tunisian flag were seen during the rest of the campaign.

On the day of the vote, Saied made a declaration broadcast on national television in which he explained certain points of the draft constitution, thus breaking electoral silence. The Tunisian Association for the Integrity and Democracy of Elections (ATIDE) denounced this violation, while Haute Autorité Indépendante de la Communication Audiovisuelle (HAICA) issued a warning to the Tunisian television establishment that broadcast the statement. The ISIE said it would investigate and enforce the law against anyone who violated electoral silence. After the announcement of the preliminary results, it confirmed that the president's statement represented an electoral violation but ruled out the possibility that it had affected the outcome given the lopsided results of the referendum.

== Political party positions ==
=== Support ===
Before the publication of the draft constitution, the People's Movement called on Tunisians to participate in the referendum, without taking a position. After the draft was published, the movement endorsed the new constitution. The Alliance for Tunisia, the Green Party for Progress, Tunisia Forward, the Popular Current, and the Patriotic Youth Movement of Tunisia all called for a vote for the draft constitution. The Tunisian Workers' Union also supported a "Yes" vote.

=== Neutrality ===
Called to participate in the advisory commission for the drafting of the new constitution, the Tunisian General Labour Union decided to boycott what it called an "apparent dialogue", accusing the President of the Republic of making unilateral decisions. Nonetheless, it said that it would accept the will of the people if a majority of voters approved the constitution. After the publication of the draft constitution, it gave its leaders the freedom to participate or not and to vote for or against the constitution.

=== Opposition ===
Before the publication of the draft constitution, Afek Tounes called for participation in the referendum to vote against the "political project" of the president. The party used the slogan "No to the project of Kais Saied" to express its opposition, referring to old comments in which Saied stated that he "dreams of seeing an Arab people say no" to a referendum that is a "tool of dictatorship". During the referendum campaign, Afek Tounes was prevented from holding a campaign meeting in Regueb following physical threats, as well as a demonstration in Le Bardo. The party also denounced violations of the electoral code when posters and banners in favor of the "Yes" campaign showed the Tunisian flag.

The Soumoud coalition called for a vote against the draft constitution. The Al Chaâb Yourid party did the same to "save the Tunisian Republic from serious dangers". The Arraya Al Wataniya party, which was registered among the participants in the campaign, withdrew and called for the postponement of the referendum following the amendments made to the draft during the campaign. The Azimoun movement also declared that it would vote against the new constitution.

Rejecting the draft constitution, the National Union of Tunisian Journalists argued that it represented a "regression in terms of freedom of expression and of the press", while the Tunisian Human Rights League said it did not correspond to its charter and its values. Activists from the Tunisian Association of Democratic Women and the Tunisian Forum for Economic and Social Rights also rejected the draft, saying it "jeopardizes the status of rights and freedoms". These four associations and unions were among the 42 signatories of the Civil Coalition for Freedom, Dignity, Social Justice and Equality, founded on 18 July 2022 to fight against the referendum. The non-governmental organization Al Bawsala also announced its "refusal and opposition" to the project. The Republican People's Union called for a "No" vote. When the amendments to the project were published, it took legal action to challenge the date of the referendum, which did not change.

=== Boycott ===
Ennahda called for a boycott of the referendum and emphasized its attachment to the 2014 Constitution. After the publication of the draft constitution, the party reiterated its position on the referendum, which it described as an attempt to subvert the will of the people and give false legitimacy to an authoritarian government. The Free Destourian Party refused to recognize the referendum and filed a complaint against the chairman of the advisory commission, Sadok Belaïd, and a member, Amine Mahfoudh, accusing them of fraud and trying to illegitimately change Tunisia's form of government. It also organized a demonstration in front of the headquarters of the ISIE to demand that the referendum process be stopped before going to court.

The National Salvation Front—a coalition made up of several political parties, including Ennahda, Al Amal, the Dignity Coalition, Heart of Tunisia, and the Citizens movement against the coup of 25 July 2021, as well as members of civil society, and chaired by Ahmed Najib Chebbi—called for a boycott of the referendum, the process of which it described as "illegal and unconstitutional". The Democratic Modernist Pole rejected the referendum even before having access to the draft constitution. The Workers' Party accused Saied of wanting to consolidate a totalitarian regime, describing the draft as a "masquerade" and calling for a boycott. The Machrouu Tounes movement announced that it would not participate in the referendum and called for a return to a serious national dialogue. The Social Democratic Path, the Democratic Forum for Labour and Liberties, and the Democratic Patriots' Unified Party also called for a boycott.

== Results ==
Turnout was low at only 31%, according to official figures released by Tunisia's elections committee. The new constitution was declared approved regardless because there was no minimum turnout requirement for the referendum to be valid.

Choice	Votes	%
For	2,607,884	94.60
Against	148,723	5.40
Total	2,756,607	100.00
Valid votes	2,756,607	97.40
Invalid/blank votes	73,487	2.60
Total votes	2,830,094	100.00
Registered voters/turnout	9,278,541	30.50
Source: ISIE

== Aftermath ==
=== Internal ===
When the "Yes" victory was announced, President Saied went to Avenue Habib Bourguiba in Tunis, where celebrations were taking place, and announced plans to focus on changing the electoral law. On the opposite end of the spectrum, the National Salvation Front called on Saied to resign, stating that the referendum was a failure given the low turnout.

After announcing the opening of appeals against the results of the referendum, the centre-right political party Afek Tounes and the human rights organization I Watch confirmed their intention to file an appeal with the higher administrative court in order to annul the results. The centre-left political party Democratic Current announced that it would boycott the legislative elections scheduled for December. The court's spokesperson, Imed Ghabri, said in a press release on 29 July 2022 that the Administrative Court had not yet received any appeals regarding the preliminary results of the referendum.

=== United States ===
US Secretary of State Antony Blinken said that Tunisia had seen an erosion of democratic standards over the past year, and that many of the gains made by the Tunisian people since the Tunisian Revolution had been reversed. Blinken added that the United States shared the concerns of many Tunisians that the process of drafting the new constitution had limited genuine debate, stressing that the US would continue to strongly support Tunisia's democratic transition.

In response, the Tunisian Ministry of Foreign Affairs summoned the chargé d'affaires at the US Embassy in Tunis, Natasha Franceschi, to publish a formal protest against Blinken's statements. Franceschi was informed of Tunisia's surprise at the statement, which the ministry claimed did not reflect the reality of the situation in Tunisia and contradicted the principles of the Vienna Convention on Diplomatic Relations.

=== International organisations ===
The international human rights organization Amnesty International said that the passage of the new constitution marked "a setback" that "dismantles or threatens key institutional safeguards for human rights".
