= Parliament of Tunisia =

National legislature

The Tunisian Parliament (Arabic: البرلمان التونسي al-Barlamān at-Tūnsī) is the bicameral institution exercising the legislative power of the Tunisian Republic. After the election of a constituent assembly in 1956, the Constitution of 1959 created the National Assembly, which became the Chamber of Deputies in 1981. The constitutional reform of 1 June 2002 created a second chamber, the parliament thus becoming bicameral; it is therefore composed of the Chamber of Deputies, which has become the lower house, and the Chamber of Advisors, the new upper house.

During the transitional period following the 2011 revolution, parliament once again had a single chamber, the constituent assembly, a configuration confirmed by the creation of the Assembly of the Representatives of the People (ARP) by the 2014 Constitution. The Tunisian Constitution of 2022 restores an upper house, called the National Council of Regions and Districts (NCRD).

== Timeline ==
The first legislative elections took place in 1959, at the same time as the election of the President of the Republic, after the Constituent Assembly had completed the drafting of the Republican Constitution. In 2002, President Zine El Abidine Ben Ali organized the first referendum which aimed to modify the conditions of candidacy for the presidency of the Republic as well as to create the House of Advisors.

Following the 2011 revolution, the Chamber of Deputies was chaired during its session on 4 February 2011 by its vice-president, Sahbi Karoui, after the departure of the titular president, Fouad Mebazaa, who became interim president of the Republic. The two chambers vote full powers to the latter, who can now govern by decree-laws. From then on, they ceased their activity then were dissolved under the decree-law of 23 March 2011 relating to the provisional organization of public authorities, before being replaced by the High Authority for the achievement of the objectives of the revolution, political reform and of the democratic transition then by a new Constituent Assembly, elected on 23 October 2011.

Following this election, it elects a President of the Republic and votes confidence in the new government. It also suspends the Constitution of 1959 and replaces it with the constituent law of 2011. The Constitution promulgated on 10 February 2014 marks the creation of the Assembly of the Representatives of the People.

On 25 July 2021, President Kaïs Saïed, invoking article 80 of the Constitution, suspended the work of the assembly and announced the lifting of the immunity of all deputies. On 22 September, he announced the extension of the decisions and decided to suspend the salaries and benefits granted to the president of the assembly and its members. On 30 March 2022, based on article 72 of the Constitution, the president dissolves parliament. The Tunisian Constitution of 2022 restores an upper house, called the National Council of Regions and Districts.

Period	Constitution	Upper house	Lower house
1956–1959	Decree of 21 September 1955	National Constituent Assembly	
1959–1981	Constitution of 1959	National Assembly	
1981–2002	Constitution of 1959	Chamber of Deputies	
2002–2011	Constitution of 1959	Chamber of Advisors	Chamber of Deputies
2011	Decree of 23 March 2011	Higher Authority for Realisation of the Objectives of the Revolution, Political Reform and Democratic Transition	
2011–2014	Tunisian Constituent Law of 2011	Constituent Assembly	
2014–2021	Tunisian Constitution of 2014	Assembly of the Representatives of the People	
2022–	Tunisian Constitution of 2022	National Council of Regions and Districts	Assembly of the Representatives of the People
