= President of the Chamber of Advisors =

The president of the Chamber of Advisors of Tunisia was the presiding officer of that body. From the creation of the Chamber of Advisors in 2002 until its replacement first by the Constituent Assembly in 2011 and then by the Assembly of the Representatives of the People in 2014, it was the upper house of the Parliament of Tunisia.

== List ==
Name	Portrait	Took office	Left office	Political party
Presidents of the Chamber of Advisors
1	Abdallah Kallel عبد الله القلال	16 August 2005	25 January 2011	Democratic Constitutional Rally
—	Mekki Aloui مكي العلوي (acting)	25 January 2011	23 March 2011	Independent
Chamber suspended and abolished. Replaced by a unicameral Constituent Assembly.

== See also ==
- Chamber of Advisors
- Constituent Assembly of Tunisia
- Assembly of the Representatives of the People (Tunisia)
