= 2000s in Tunisia =

A historic snapshot of Tunisia during the first decade of the 2000s is presented. Since then, however, Tunisia has been transformed politically and socially by the Tunisian Revolution, which commenced in early 2011. Quickly Ben 'Ali was overthrown and left the country, his political party the Rassemblement Constitutionnel Démocratique was disbanded. Over the next several years the government structure of Tunisia has been gradually reconstituted by democratic means.

== Ben 'Ali regime ==
Ben 'Ali in 1987 had constitutionally removed from office the former leader Habib Bourguiba (1903-2000, President 1957–1987). Ben 'Ali himself then won election as the new president. The change in leadership "took place in complete calm" and the new regime inherited "a well-established party nomenclatura". In 2004 Ben'Ali was reelected for a five-year term, with a reported 94.5% of the vote. Elected also were 189 members of the Majlis al-Nuwaab or Chamber of Deputies, whose term was also five years. In addition, there was a Chamber of Advisors composed of 126 members with six-year terms; of these 85 are selected by: government subdivisions (e.g., municipalities), professional associations, and trade unions (yet 14 union members boycotted the process); the other 41 members were appointed by the President. The court system remained a combination of French Civil Law and Islamic law. The autocratic rule of Ben 'Ali was extended in 2009 by his reelection, reportedly at 99.44%.

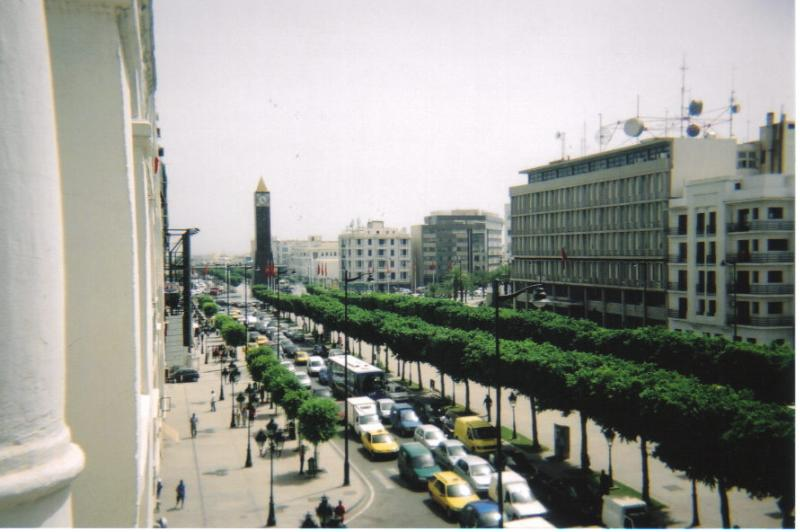
Tunis central district.

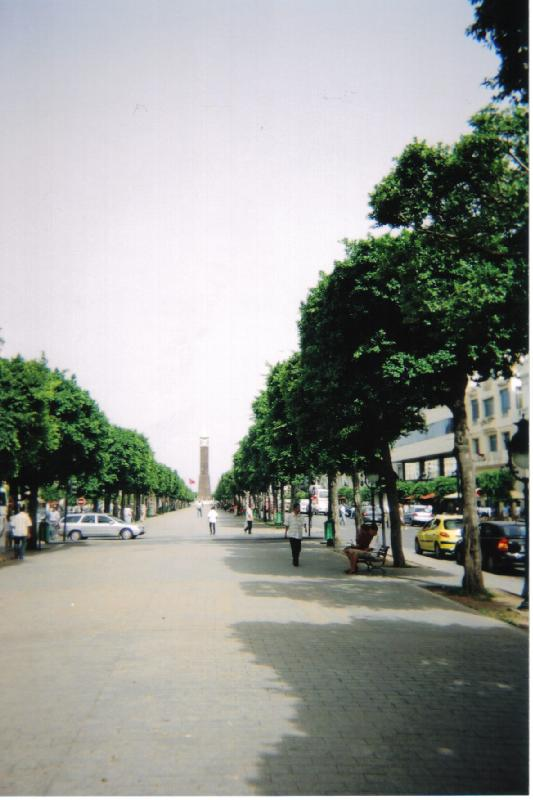
Tunis pedestrian mall with central district landmark.

A widely supported human rights movement had emerged, initiated by trade unionists, lawyers, and journalists, in addition to being joined by aggrieved Islamists. Tunisia's political institutions, however, often appeared to remain fixed in an authoritarian past. As reported in 2001, the government's response to calls for reform had been house arrests and prison. The government refused to cease its repression of the Islamist opposition party, due to prior terrorist activity. Generally, the Ben 'Ali regime's governance of the country included fostering a political climate considered rigid, from time to time using objectionable police methods to repress dissent. Before becoming president Ben 'Ali had been "a police and security specialist" who during his military career once led the Gendarmerie National.

In foreign affairs, Tunisia continued its close ties to the West. Nonetheless, the Arab League secretariat, which had moved to Tunis from Cairo in 1979, before Ben 'Ali's presidency, remained until 1991 when it relocated back to Cairo. An association agreement with the European Union, signed in 1995, was scheduled to move Tunisia toward full free trade with the EU by 2008. Following the 2001 al-Qaeda attacks on the United States, Tunisia stood with the west against terrorism. Within the Maghreb, efforts continued to form a regional unity with Algeria, Morocco, Libya, and Mauritania, in the Arab Maghreb Union. Yet for Tunisia, "over 90 percent of its trade [was] with Europe, most of it with France." From the perspective of the first decade of the 21st century, Tunisia pursued a moderate strategy in its foreign relations, actively associated with the west, yet nurturing its ties to the developing world.

In managing the economy the Ben 'Ali regime was said to have mostly "met with success" yet it was a success "built on the repressive institutions and personality cult" of an earlier era. "Within the regional Maghrebi context, Tunisia has been relatively efficient in instituting economic reforms, and its economy was the strongest in terms of growth, stability, and integration into a wider global market." A favorable factor was the motivated "entrepreneurial middle class". Although many Tunisians disliked the regime's authoritarian repression, in compensation there was the government's ability to develop the country. "Tunisia's strong economy throughout most of the Ben 'Ali era helped to neutralize political opposition." Yet under Ben 'Ali, the modernizing privatization of state enterprises became corrupted at its root, benefitting insiders and family members. Thereafter the corruption in the regime multiplied and became notorious.

== Society and business ==
Tunis, the capital city, had a population of about 700,000, out of Tunisia's total of nearly 10 million. The second city of Sfax, a Mediterranean port to the south, a commercial and industrial center, numbered approximately 250,000. The population growth rate measured as births per female had fallen from 7 (1960s) to 2 (2007). Life expectancy was female 75, male 72. Required education was eight years. The religion composition was: Muslim 98%, with 1% Christian, and 1% Jewish and other. The official language continued as Arabic, with French also spoken particularly in commercial dealings, and with less than 2% Berber. Literacy by recent definition included all over 15 years; overall it was 74%, male 83% and female 65%. In 2006, 7.3 million mobile phones were in use and 1.3 million Tunisians were on the internet. There were 26 television stations and 29 radio stations.

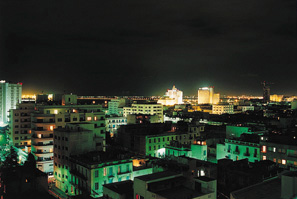
Tunis at night.

Over half the population was considered urban, with agricultural workers being about 30% of the total. Between 1988 and 1998 the economy more than doubled. Unemployment in 2000 was about 15.6%, and in 2006 about 13.9%. Over 300,000 Tunisians were reported to be residing in France during 1994. Left out of the recent prosperity were many rural and urban poor, including small businesses facing the world market.

The business community was diverse. The nation's domestic economy was based primarily on light industry (food processing, textiles, footwear, agribusiness, mining commodities, construction materials) and on agriculture (olives, olive oil, grains (wheat and barley), tomatoes, citrus, sugar beets, dates, almonds, figs, vegetables, grapes, beef dairy), as well as livestock (sheep, goats) and fishing. Other sectors included the petroleum industry and mining (phosphates, iron, lead, zinc, salt). Tunisia was self-sufficient in oil, but not in natural gas. Exports in aggregate were sent to France 29%, Italy 20%, Germany 9%, Spain 6%, Libya 5%, U.S.A. 4%. Imports arrived from France 25%, Italy 22%, Germany 10%, Spain 5%. A very significant portion was generated by tourism. On average five million tourists were visiting each year, and "one in eight Tunisians depended, directly or indirectly, on [the tourist industry] for their livelihoods".

The monetary unit remained the dinar, at about 1.33 per dollar U.S.A. in 2000 (the dinar was then maintaining a fairly constant rate). Inflation was estimated at 4.5% in 2006. Tunisia's Gross Domestic Product (G.D.P.) was composed of approximately 12.5% agriculture, 33.1% industry, and 54.4% services. The economy grew at 5% per year during the 1990s (the best in North Africa), but hit a 15-year low of 1.9% in 2002 (due to drought and a decline in tourism following world terrorist attacks). It regained a 5% rate for 2003–2005, and was said to be 4%-5% for 2006. Tunisia's per capita annual income was approximately 8,900 U.S.A. dollars in 2006.

The face of the countryside changes markedly as one moves from north to south. In the north and central coast, orchards and fields predominate; while in the central plains, pasturage. An overview of Tunisian land use would apportion arable land at 17%-19%, with forest and woodland 4%, permanent crops 13%, irrigated lands at 2.4%; about 20% is used for pasture. There are limited fresh water resources. In the south the environment grows increasingly arid, until eventually reaching the Sahara desert borderlands. Roads total about 20,000 km., two-thirds being paved, with most of the unpaved roads lying in the desert south.
