= National Council of Regions and Districts =

Upper house of the Tunisian parliament

National Council of Regions and Districts المجلس الوطني للجهات والأقاليم Al Majlis Al Watani l'il Jihet W'al Akalim

Type
- Type: Upper house

History
- Founded: 25 July 2022
- New session started: 19 April 2024

Leadership
- President of the National Council of Provinces and Territories: Imed Derbali, independent since 19 April 2024
- First Vice President of the Council: Zakiya Maaroufi, independent since 19 April 2024
- Second Vice President of the Council: Youssef Barkaoui, independent since 19 April 2024

Structure

Elections
- Voting system: Indirect two-round system
- Last election: 29 March 2024

Meeting place
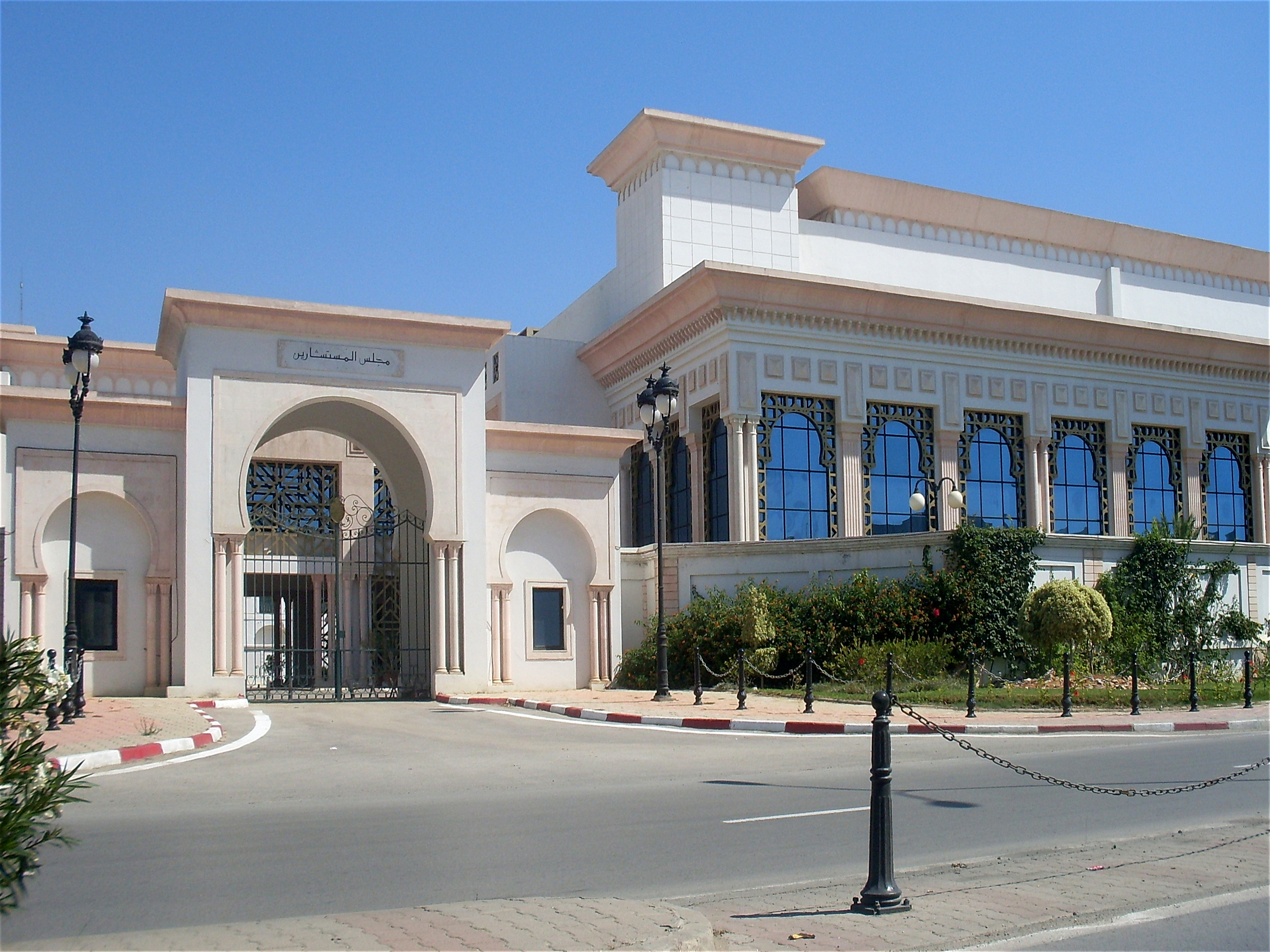
- Bardo Palace, Le Bardo (near Tunis)

Constitution
- Constitution of the Republic of Tunisia

The National Council of Regions and Districts (Arabic: المجلس الوطني للجهات والأقاليم) is the upper house of the Parliament of Tunisia since the promulgation of the New Constitution approved during the constitutional referendum of 25 July 2022.

== Role and functions ==
According to article 84 of the Tunisian Constitution of 2022 projects relating to the state budget and regional development plans must be submitted to the National Council to ensure a balance between the regions and territories. The National Council of Regions and Districts is responsible for legislative power. According to article 85 of the Constitution, it exercises a control function regarding the implementation of budgets and development plans.

== Voting method ==
The National Council of Regions and Districts is made up of deputies elected indirectly by members of the regional and district councils, with three seats per region and one seat per district. Members of each regional council elect three members by multi-member majority vote, while those of each district council elect one member by first-past-the-post majority vote.
