= 2024 Tunisian National Council of Regions and Districts election =

National election in Tunisia

The 2024 National Council of Regions and Districts election took place on 28–29 March in Tunisia in order to elect the 77 members of the upper house of the Tunisian Parliament. It was the first election to the chamber since the enactment of the 2022 constitution.

== Electoral system ==
The National Council of Regions and Districts is made up of deputies elected indirectly by members of the regional and district councils, with three seats per region and one seat per district. Members of each regional council elect three members by multi-member majority vote, while those of each district council elect one member by first-past-the-post majority vote.

== Results ==
All elected candidates were independent, among them 67 men and 10 women.
