= 2002 Tunisian constitutional referendum =

Referendum in Tunisia

- 26 May 2002

Results
Choice	Votes	%
Yes	3,462,177	99.52%
No	16,642	0.48%
Valid votes	3,478,819	99.85%
Invalid or blank votes	5,172	0.15%
Total votes	3,483,991	100.00%
Registered voters/turnout	3,644,845	95.59%

A constitutional referendum was held in Tunisia on 26 May 2002. The amendments to the constitution would abolish the three-term limit for incumbent presidents and raise the age limit of a sitting president from 70 to 75. A second parliamentary chamber (Chamber of Advisors) was introduced.

The changes were reportedly approved by 99.52% of voters, with a 95.59% voter turnout, but the results were denounced by the opposition as a masquerade.

== Results ==
Tunisian constitutional referendum, 2002
Choice	Votes	%
For	3,462,177	99.52
Against	16,642	0.48
Total	3,478,819	100.00
Valid votes	3,478,819	99.85
Invalid/blank votes	5,172	0.15
Total votes	3,483,991	100.00
Registered voters/turnout		95.59
Source: POGAR
