= Tunisian Constitution of 1959 =

- Presented: 1 June 1959
- Superseded: 23 December 2011
- Location: Tunisia
- Signatories: Habib Bourguiba, President of the Republic

The Tunisian Constitution of 1959 was promulgated on 1 June 1959. The application of the text was suspended following the Tunisian Revolution, a Constituent Assembly being elected on 23 October 2011 to draft a new text. In the meantime, a decree-law of 23 March 2011 then a constitutive law of 16 December of the same year provisionally organized the public authorities. The new Constitution was adopted on 26 January 2014.

The supreme legal norm of the country, composed of 78 articles, it constitutes the second Constitution in the modern history of the country. The first was adopted in 1861, making Tunisia the first Arab state to adopt such a text, after the proclamation of the Fundamental Pact of 1857. Legal foundation of the republican regime, it is marked by the affirmation of a strong executive. The Constitutional Council verifies a posteriori the conformity of laws with the Constitution when it is referred to it.

== History ==
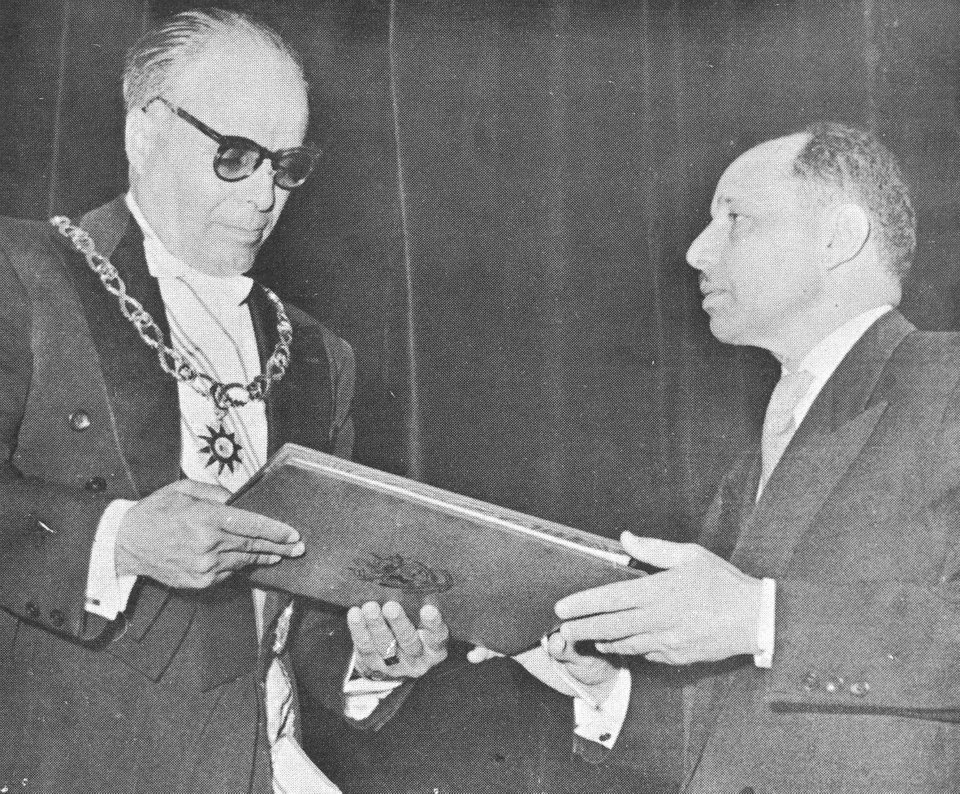
Jallouli Fares, president of the Constituent Assembly, handing over the Constitution to the President of the Republic, Habib Bourguiba, President of the Republic during its promulgation on 1 June 1959.

Shortly before Tunisia's independence, a decree of 29 December 1955 established a Constituent Assembly. On 6 January 1956, another decree established the terms of his election: all men of Tunisian nationality and aged 21 or over were declared voters; Candidates must be at least 30 years old and able to read and write. The vote must be held by majority vote in one round without the possibility of mixing. A decree dated March 1 sets the number of constituencies at 18 and the number of assembly seats at 98.

After independence was recognized on 20 March 1956, it was elected 25 on March, a day declared a public holiday by a decree of 22 March; a by-election is also organized on 26 August to fill ten vacant seats. Installed at the Bardo Palace, she developed a new Constitution with the initial project of establishing a constitutional monarchy. However, on 25 July 1957, it voted for the abolition of the Beylical monarchy and the establishment of the republican regime, with the appointment of Habib Bourguiba as provisional president, pending the drafting of the constitutional text. Once approved by the Constituent Assembly, it was promulgated on 1 June 1959, three years after independence, through Law No. 59-57 published in the Official Gazette of the Republic of Tunisia.

The preamble appearing in the law, opened by the basmala, calls in particular to consolidate national unity, to remain faithful to the teachings of Islam and the anchoring of Tunisia to its Maghreb and Arab environment, and to establish a democracy “based on the sovereignty of the people and characterized by a stable political regime based on the separation of powers.” The republic is judged to be the regime capable of guaranteeing respect for human rights, the equality of citizens and economic development.

== Articles ==
=== General provisions ===
The first chapter of the Constitution, bringing together 17 articles, gives the main principles on which the Tunisian State and society are based.

==== Principles ====
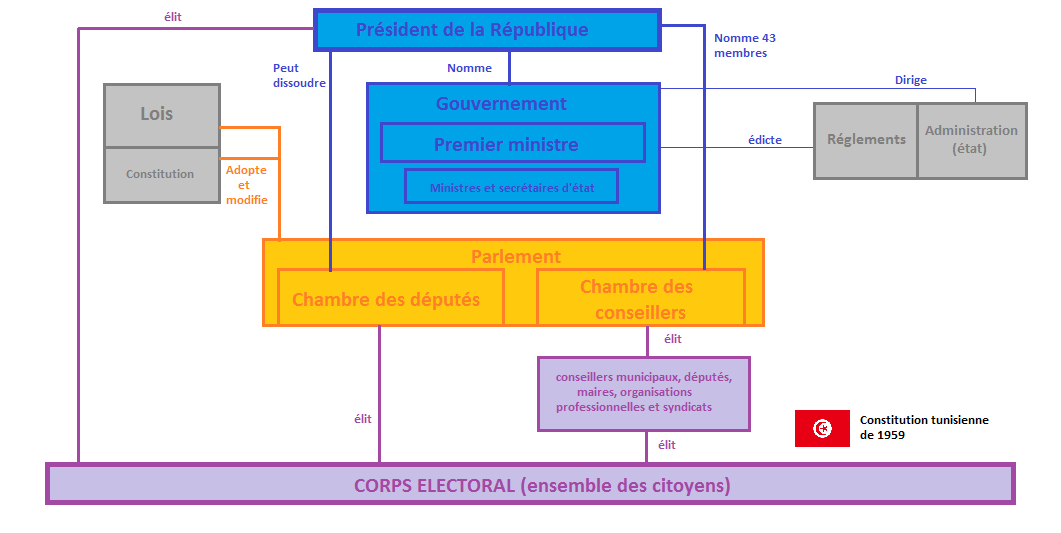
Organization of Tunisian institutions according to the 1959 constitution.

The first of these makes Tunisia a free, independent and sovereign state; Islam is elevated to the rank of state religion and Arabic to the rank of official language. The republic is chosen as its political regime. Article 2 proclaims its attachment to the Greater Arab Maghreb and its desire to participate in its unification; any resulting constitutional change would be subject to referendum since, according to article 3, the Tunisian people are holders of sovereignty. For its part, article 4 describes the flag of Tunisia as well as the republican motto.

The other articles focus on listing the rights and duties of the Tunisian citizen and State. Article 5 guarantees fundamental freedoms and human rights "in their universal, comprehensive, complementary and interdependent sense", the principles of the rule of law and pluralism, the dignity of man and the development of his personality, the inviolability of the human person and freedom of conscience, as well as the free exercise of religion “provided that he does not disturb public order”. The values of solidarity, mutual aid and tolerance between individuals, groups and generations are also cited.

==== Rights, duties and freedoms ====
In this vein, article 6 proclaims the same rights and duties for all citizens, deemed equal before the law. These individual rights may be limited according to Article 7 by a legislative act aimed at “the protection of the rights of others, respect for public order, national defense, economic development and social progress”. Various freedoms (opinion, speech, press, publication, assembly and association) are recognized in Article 8, but subject to conditions defined legally, as are the right to organize and the right to property (Article 14). Article 9 also recognizes the inviolability of the home, the secrecy of correspondence and the protection of personal data while Article 10 guarantees freedom of movement “within the limits provided by law”; banishment or prohibition from entering the country is prohibited by article 11, as is the extradition of political refugees (article 17).

Political parties, organized on democratic bases, must to be recognized "respect the sovereignty of the people, the values of the Republic, human rights and the principles relating to personal status", but also reject violence, fanaticism, racism and discrimination. Nor can they be based on a religion, a language, a race, a gender or a region and maintain ties of dependence with foreigners. On a judicial level, articles 12 and 13 also provide guarantees to citizens: police custody and preventive detention subject to judicial control, presumption of innocence, personal punishment, treatment of the individual "with respect for their dignity", etc. Article 15 refers to national defense, defined as both a right and a "sacred duty" of every citizen, and Article 16 refers to the duty to pay tax "on the basis of 'equity ".

=== Legislative authority ===
Chapter II, subdivided into 18 articles, is devoted to the constitutional rules relating to the legislative power. Under Article 18, legislative power is vested in the parliament composed of the Chamber of Deputies and the Chamber of Advisors. The first is elected by direct universal suffrage for a five-year term, unlike the second which is elected by local elected officials for a six-year term and half renewed every three years; the number of members of the latter chamber cannot exceed two thirds of that of the deputies. Article 19 also specifies their distribution: representatives of the governorates chosen from among local elected officials and representatives of employers, farmers and employees chosen from among candidates from professional organizations; the President of the Republic designates the rest of the members “among national personalities and skills”. According to article 24, the two institutions are based in Tunis and its suburbs except in exceptional circumstances. In “case of war or imminent danger”, their mandates can be extended by a law passed by the deputies according to article 23.

Articles 20 and 21 specify the conditions for being a voter and eligible. On the one hand, any person of Tunisian nationality for at least five years and aged 18 can vote. On the other hand, any person whose one parent is of Tunisian nationality and who is at least 23 years old on the day of candidacy for the Chamber of Deputies, at least 40 years old for the Chamber of Advisors, is eligible. Once elected, each deputy represents the entire nation according to article 25 Articles 26 and 27 establish the immunity granted to parliamentarians. Thus, the deputy or advisor cannot be prosecuted, arrested or judged “because of opinions expressed, proposals made or acts accomplished in the exercise of his mandate within each chamber”. The same applies to crimes and misdemeanors during the exercise of their mandate, unless their immunity is lifted by the chamber concerned or the flagrante delicto is noted.

==== Laws ====
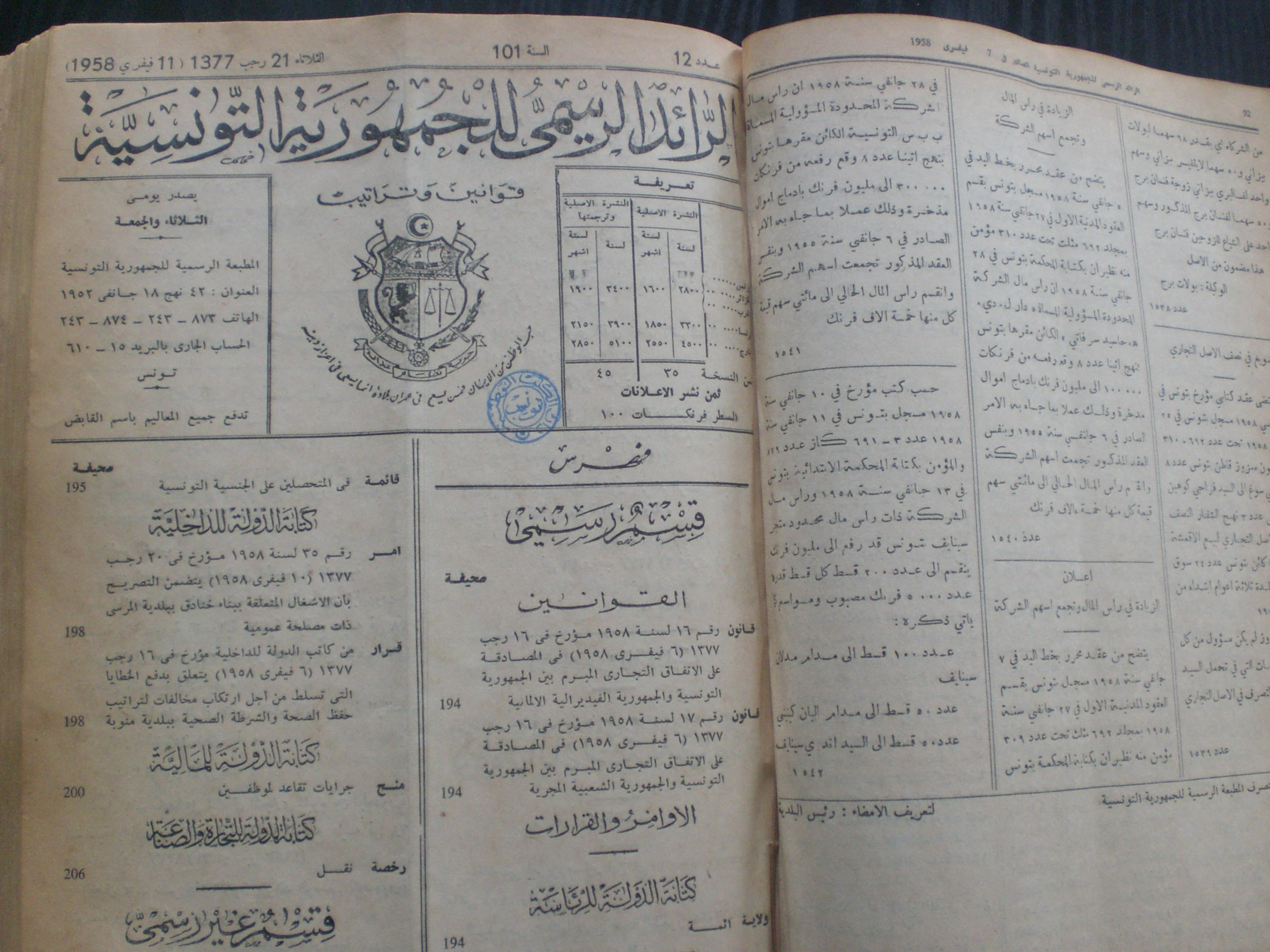
The Official Gazette of the Republic of Tunisia where the adopted laws are published.

If the initiative for draft laws belongs to both the President of the Republic and the deputies, presidential projects are nevertheless declared a priority. Furthermore, no project presented by the deputies can lead to a reduction in public resources or an increase in costs. For a specific period and purpose, the two chambers may instruct the President of the Republic to govern by decree-laws to be submitted for their approval at the end of the period; the president may do the same during chamber recess. Organic laws must be passed by an absolute majority of the members of the chamber concerned and ordinary laws by a majority of those present, which cannot be less than a third of the total members; the conditions for the approval of finance laws and the budget are also specified.

Article 32 lists the treaties that must be approved by the Chamber of Deputies and which benefit from authority superior to the laws. Article 34 establishes the types of texts taking the form of laws, the other types being governed by the regulatory power according to the conditions of article 35; the President of the Republic who exercises this power can therefore declare inadmissible any text intervening in this area and submit it to the Constitutional Council.

==== Functioning ====
Regular sessions of the chambers are held between October and July; they can be convened during their vacation in extraordinary session at the request of the President of the Republic or the majority of deputies. Each of them elects permanent commissions as well as commissions to study development plans and finance laws, take care of parliamentary immunity and regulations. Article 33 details the relationship between the two chambers: the Chamber of Advisors must therefore decide on a project adopted by the deputies within fifteen days, otherwise it is submitted to the President of the Republic for promulgation. In the event of differences between the adopted texts, a joint committee is formed to resolve, within one week, the disagreements with the approval of the government; the Chamber of Deputies may, however, refuse the negotiated amendments. If the committee does not reach an agreement, the text adopted by the Chamber of Deputies is promulgated.

==== Report to the executive ====
Parliamentary immunity and the existence of two chambers seem to guarantee a separation between the legislative power and the executive power. However, the role of the legislative power is limited to validating or invalidating the executive's proposals. Indeed, article 28 stipulates that members of the House of Advisors cannot propose laws. The deputies can propose them but those of the President of the Republic have priority in their examination; nor can they propose laws leading to a modification of the tax base or new expenditures. This control role is very insufficient with regard to the finance law where, in the event of refusal of this law at the end of the calendar year, the executive can operate with these bills for three renewable months by going through decrees. Article 34 defines all the subjects requiring a law, which is very broad. As a result, the executive cannot be satisfied with decrees and is obliged to go before the legislative power to validate the reforms it proposes.

=== Executive power ===
Chapter 3, devoted to the executive power, is the longest in the Constitution: it has 26 articles, including 19 devoted to the function of President of the Republic and 5 to the government. The framework is firstly given by an introductory article, article 37, which indicates that this power is in the hands of the President of the Republic; this is assisted by the government under the direction of a Prime Minister.

==== Presidency of the Republic ====
Section I, devoted to the presidency, opens with article 38 attributing to him the function of head of state and specifying that Islam must be his religion. Elected according to article 39 by direct universal suffrage for a mandate of five years, during an election which can be done in two rounds, he is re-electable without limitation on the number of mandates; this mandate can be extended by the Chamber of Deputies “because of war or imminent danger”. Article 40 then specifies the eligibility conditions: be Tunisian, exclusively of Tunisian nationality, of Muslim religion, of Tunisian father, mother, paternal and maternal grandfathers, "all remaining of Tunisian nationality without discontinuity", aged from 40 to 75 years old at the time of their candidacy, enjoy all civil and political rights and be presented by a determined number of deputies and presidents of municipalities. The applications are then validated by the Constitutional Council.

Several articles specify the presidential functions, notably article 41 which makes it the “guarantor of national independence, territorial integrity and respect for the Constitution and laws as well as the execution of treaties”. It directs the general policy of the State according to article 49 and “informs the Chamber of Deputies”. Ensuring the continuity of the State, he benefits from jurisdictional immunity for his activities during and after the exercise of his functions. Articles 42 to 45 provide details regarding his constitutional oath, the seat of the presidency, his role as supreme leader of the Armed Forces, and his diplomatic role; Article 48 gives him the right to conclude treaties, the right to declare war and conclude peace and the right of pardon. He can also submit draft laws to referendum under the conditions of article 47.

Cases of "imminent danger threatening the institutions of the Republic, the security and independence of the country and hindering the regular functioning of public authorities" confer, under article 46, exceptional powers requiring only consultation of the Prime Minister and presidents of the legislative chambers. With regard to governmental and legislative activity, the president also plays a key role: he appoints and dismisses the Prime Minister and the members of the government of whom he chairs the Council of Ministers where the draft laws are deliberated. He promulgates the laws published in the Official Gazette of the Republic of Tunisia, whose execution he ensures, and exercises regulatory power. It also benefits from the prerogative of sending a bill back to the Chamber of Deputies for a second reading and, in cases where the Constitutional Council issues an opinion, to send the bill back to it after modification of some of the articles. Finally, he fills senior positions, both civil and military, a prerogative that he can delegate to the Prime Minister.

Finally, Articles 56 and 57 provide for the procedure in the event of temporary or permanent incapacity of the President of the Republic. In the first case, he can delegate most of the responsibilities to the Prime Minister. In the second case, due to death, resignation or "absolute impediment", it is the Constitutional Council which is responsible for noting the vacancy and it is the President of the Chamber of Deputies who is vested with most of his functions for a period of 45 to 60 days. The latter cannot run in the presidential election and no modification of the Constitution or presentation of a motion of censure is authorized.

==== Government ====
Section 2 supervises the activity of the government, which ensures, according to article 58, the implementation of the policy as defined by the President of the Republic to whom it is responsible according to article 59. It is directed by the Prime Minister who, in the words of article 60, “directs and coordinates the action of the government”. The relationship between government and parliamentarians is also specified by article 61, in particular the oral and written questions submitted to ministers and the responses that may be given.

Article 62 also opens the possibility of the Chamber of Deputies voting on a motion of censure against the government "if it appears to the Chamber that it is not acting in accordance with the general policy of the State and the fundamental options provided for by articles 49 and 58”. Motivated and signed by at least a third of the deputies, it must be adopted by an absolute majority of the deputies, a case which has never arisen to date.

=== Judicial authority ===
The judicial power is governed by Chapter 4 bringing together four articles. Article 64 specifies that “judgments are rendered in the name of the people and executed in the name of the President of the Republic” while article 65 proclaims the independence of the judicial authority and its submission to the sole authority of the law. .

The following two articles specify the method of appointing magistrates: article 66 indicates that they are appointed by decree of the President of the Republic on the proposal of the Superior Council of the Judiciary. The latter, established by article 67, must ensure “respect for the guarantees granted to magistrates in matters of appointment, advancement, transfer and discipline”.

=== Various institutions ===
A certain number of bodies are then created by chapters 5 to 8 which have only one article each: article 68 establishes the High Court, a judicial body intended to judge members of the government accused of high treason, while the Article 69 establishes the Council of State bringing together the Administrative Tribunal and the Court of Auditors. The Economic and Social Council is for its part established by article 70, and the decentralized institutions municipal councils, regional councils and local authorities by article 71.

The Constitutional Council has its own chapter, Chapter 9, added by Constitutional Law No. 95-90 of 6 November 1995. This body necessarily examines the constitutionality of a series of texts listed in Article 72, whether they are voted on by Parliament or submitted directly by the President of the Republic. The Constitutional Council also constitutes a final avenue of appeal with regard to the results of legislative elections and monitors the organization of referendums. Article 75 finally specifies the composition of the body nine members of which four are designated by the President of the Republic and two by the President of the Chamber of Deputies (affiliated with the presidential party) and the incompatibilities of functions.

=== Revision ===
Chapter 10 is devoted to the conditions for revising the constitutional text. Article 76 thus specifies that the initiative lies with the President of the Republic or at least a third of the deputies. Any modification can be submitted to a referendum but the change of the republican form of the State is excluded in advance.

Article 77 stipulates that the draft revision must be adopted by the Chamber of Deputies, by a two-thirds majority after two readings, or by referendum after its adoption by the Chamber of Deputies in one reading and by an absolute majority.

== Amendments ==
Beginning in 1959, the Constitution was amended by the following constitutional laws:

- 1 July 1965: law No° 65-23 modifying article 29.
- 30 June 1967: law No° 67-23 modifying article 29.
- 31 December 1969: law No° 69-63 modifying article 51.
- 19 March 1975: law No° 75-13 amending articles 40 and 51.
- 8 April 1976: Law No° 76-37 amending and supplementing the Constitution.
- 9 June 1981: Law No° 81-47 modifying certain articles and replacing the name “National Assembly” with “Chamber of Deputies”.
- 9 September 1981: Law No° 81-78 organizing early legislative elections.
- 25 July 1988: Law No° 88-88 amending the Constitution.
- 8 November 1993: Law No° 93-105 relating to the next legislative and presidential mandates.
- 6 November 1995: Law No° 95-90 relating to the Constitutional Council.
- 27 October 1997: Law No° 97-65 modifying and supplementing certain articles.
- 2 November 1998: Law No° 98-76 amending paragraph 1 of Article 75.
- 30 June 1999: Law No° 99-52 establishing provisions derogating from the third paragraph of Article 40.
- 1 June 2002: law No° 2002-51 modifying certain articles.
- 13 May 2003: Law No° 2003-34 establishing provisions derogating from the third paragraph of Article 40.
- 28 July 2008: Law No° 2008-52 amending Article 20 of the Constitution and establishing provisions derogating from the third paragraph of Article 40 of the Constitution.

The most important modification is that of 8 April 1976 which recognizes the Prime Minister and the government specific prerogatives in the exercise of executive power and assistance of the Head of State. The National Assembly obtains a theoretical right of control over the action of the government for which responsibility is engaged on several occasions; Parliament even has the theoretical power to dismiss the President of the Republic in very specific cases. Modified again on 25 July 1988, it limits the number of presidential mandates to three after Habib Bourguiba was proclaimed president for life. This limitation will, however, “be accompanied by a worsening of the concentration of powers in the hands of the President of the Republic while removing the checks and balances essential to any democracy.” On 1 June 2002, following the first referendum in the country's history held on 26 May of the same year, the reform removed, among other things, the limit on the number of presidential mandates, extended the age limit for submitting a candidacy for office. presidency, establishes judicial immunity for the president (during and after the exercise of his functions) and creates a bicameral parliament.
