= Constitution of Tunisia =

Supreme law of the Tunisian Republic

The Constitution of Tunisia (Arabic: دستور الجمهورية التونسية, romanized: Dustūr al-Jumhūriyya at-Tūnusiyya, Tunisian Arabic: Dostūr ej-Jumhūriyye et-Tūnsiyye) is the supreme law of the Tunisian Republic. The constitution is the framework for the organization of the Tunisian government and for the relationship of the federal government with the governorates, citizens, and all people within Tunisia. Tunisia's first modern constitution was the Fundamental Pact of 1857. This was followed by the Constitution of 1861, which was not replaced until after the departure of French administrators in 1956, by the constitution of 1959. It was adopted on 1 June 1959 and amended in 1999 and 2002, after the Tunisian constitutional referendum of 2002.

Following the revolution and months of protests, a Constituent Assembly was elected to draft a new constitution, the Tunisian Constitution of 2014 which was adopted on 26 January 2014.

In September 2021, President Kaïs Saïed announced an upcoming reform of the 2014 Constitution. A constitutional referendum was scheduled for July 2022. The opposition called for a boycott, and the referendum saw 95% vote in favor on 30% turnout.

== History ==
=== Constitutions preceding the creation of the Tunisian state ===
The territory of modern-day Tunisia knew its first form of political organization with the constitution of ancient Carthage. Its text was extensively referred to by Aristotle in his work, Politics. In this, Aristotle speaks highly of the Carthaginian constitution and describes it as a model of a balanced constitution, having the best characteristics of other political regimes; It combines elements of monarchic (kings or shophets), aristocratic (senate) and democratic (people's assembly) regimes.

=== Fundamental Pact of 1857 ===
Beginning in 1839, the Ottoman Empire introduced a number of reforms in government starting with the Hatt-ı Şerif of the Gülhane, but these were not applied in Tunisia due to the independence of the Husainid Dynasty and the conservatism of the ruling Bey, Ahmad I ibn Mustafa. It was the death of Ahmad I and the Batto Sfez Affair and its aftermath that allowed France and England to pressure the Bey into granting reforms.

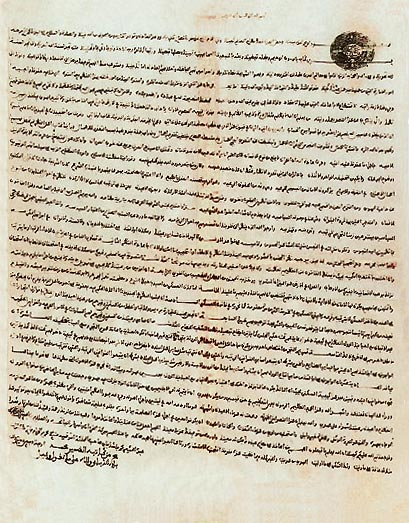
First page of 1857 Fundamental Pact

Samuel "Batto" Sfez was a Jewish teamster who worked for Jewish political boss Nasim Shamama. Following a traffic accident, Sfez was involved in an altercation with a Muslim. His opponent subsequently brought charges against Sfez, charging him with insulting Islam, a capital offense under Maliki law. There were plenty of witnesses who had heard Sfez curse his opponent and his religion. A notary investigated and took sworn statements. The court considered the matter for some time, while Shamama tried to muster support from the British and French legations. However, Nasim Shamama had previously upset the Bey, Muhammad II ibn al-Husayn, by forcing him to deal with a case of a Muslim who had murdered a Jew, where the unpopular conclusion was the execution of the Muslim. As a result, Muhammad II issued the execution order the same day that the court came down with its decision of guilty, and Sfez was summarily beheaded.

This upset not only the local Jewish community but also the local European businessmen and hence the legates from France, Leon Roches, and Britain, Richard Wood, who had already been pressuring the Bey for greater religious tolerance and equal treatment before the law, primarily in support of European commercial interests. European warships steamed into Tunisian harbors including an entire French squadron into the port of Tunis (Halq al-Wadi). Under this pressure and given the support of the liberal former general and Marine Minister Hayreddin Pasha, Muhammad II agreed to what became known as the Fundamental Pact of 1857. That document, which had many similarities to the 1839 Ottoman Hatt-ı Şerif, abolished slavery, guaranteed people to be secure in their lives and property, granted equality of taxation (thus implicitly abolishing the jizya), granted religious freedom, granted equality before the law, granted foreigner the right to own land and participate in all types of businesses and set up separate commercial courts, among other things.

Although adopted under foreign pressure, to open the country to international trade, these ideas of equality from the Age of Enlightenment found fertile ground in the Tunisian reform movement, contributed to the ideas advocated by Mahmud Qabadu and Ahmad ibn Abi Diyaf and gained the support of Hayreddin Pasha and his followers, especially generals Rustum and Hussein, despite concerns about the broadening wedge of European commerce. These ideas later inspired the national movement in its claims against the French protectorate, especially within the Constitutional Party (Destour Party).

=== Constitution of 1861 ===
Following the Fundamental Pact, a commission was set up to draft a real constitution; it was submitted on 17 September 1860 to Muhammad III as-Sadiq, the new Bey after Muhammad II. The constitution came into effect on 26 April 1861. It was the first written constitution in Arab lands, as well as the first constitution established by a state with Islam as its religion.

At the time in the West, it was known as the "Buyuruldu of the Bey of Tunis". One or more translation(s) of this was/were made in French and circulated in Europe; Johann Strauss, author of "A Constitution for a Multilingual Empire: Translations of the Kanun-ı Esasi and Other Official Texts into Minority Languages," wrote that it became "widely known" on the continent. The Ottoman Empire newspaper Ceride-i havadis printed an Ottoman Turkish version on 17 March 1861 (Turkish date: 6 Ramadan (Ramazan) 1861).

The text of 114 articles established a constitutional monarchy with a sharing of power between an executive branch consisting of the Bey and a prime minister, with important legislative prerogatives to a Grand Council, creating a type of oligarchy. It established an independent judiciary; however, the guardian of the constitution was the legislature which had sovereign authority to review unconstitutional acts by the executive. In addition, the sovereign was not free to dispose of the resources of the state and must maintain a budget, while he and the princes of his family were to receive stipends. Issues of national representation and elections were omitted. In fact, in actual practice the members of the Grand Council were appointed more through cronyism and favor swapping than national interest. Many of the old Mamluk class were appointed, keeping the bureaucracy firmly in Mamluk hands. For this reason, and others such as the provision for general military conscription and retaining the provisions granting rights to foreign nationals, many did not approve of the Bey's actions. Universal application of the mejba (head tax), under the equal taxation clause, incurred the wrath of those who had formerly been exempt: the military, scholars/teachers and government officials. Matters came to a head in 1864 when traditionalist Ali Ben Ghedhahem led a revolt against the Bey. The constitution was suspended as an emergency measure and the revolt was eventually suppressed. Ali Ben Ghedhahem was killed in 1867.

It used portions of the Edict of Gülhane from the Ottoman Empire.

=== Constitution of 1959 ===
After Tunisia gained its independence from France in 1956, a new constitution was drafted. It was adopted on 1 June 1959.

The 1959 constitution declares Tunisia to be an independent state, governed by a three branch presidential parliamentary system. It bestows certain rights on the people, including the right of ownership and right to confidentiality in personal correspondence (excluding cases of suspected criminal activity). In addition, the constitution bestows various freedoms upon the people; some of these include freedom of opinion, expression, press, and organization. It establishes Islam as the official state religion, and Arabic as its official language.

The constitution was amended on 12 July 1988, 29 June 1999, 1 June 2002, 13 May 2003, and 28 July 2008.

=== Law on the provisional organization of public authorities ===
During the Tunisian revolution, President Zine El Abidine Ben Ali left Tunisia on 14 January 2011 and Prime Minister Mohamed Ghannouchi stated that he became the acting President under Article 56 of the Constitution. Al Jazeera claimed that lawyers disagreed with Ghannouchi's claim, since under Article 57 of the Constitution of Tunisia, the Constitutional Council should meet and the leader of one of the houses of the Tunisian parliament should become an interim President. The Constitutional Council declared that "the post of president is definitely vacant" and declared that, under Article 57, Fouad Mebazaa should become the interim President, with the obligation to call for elections within 45 to 60 days.

On 15 January 2011, Mebazaa was sworn in as interim president. Various decrees in early 2011 permitted the continuation of the interim government and the "Legislative Decree of 23 March 2011" provided for initial elections. On 12 December 2011, Moncef Marzouki was elected president.

=== Constitution of 2014 ===
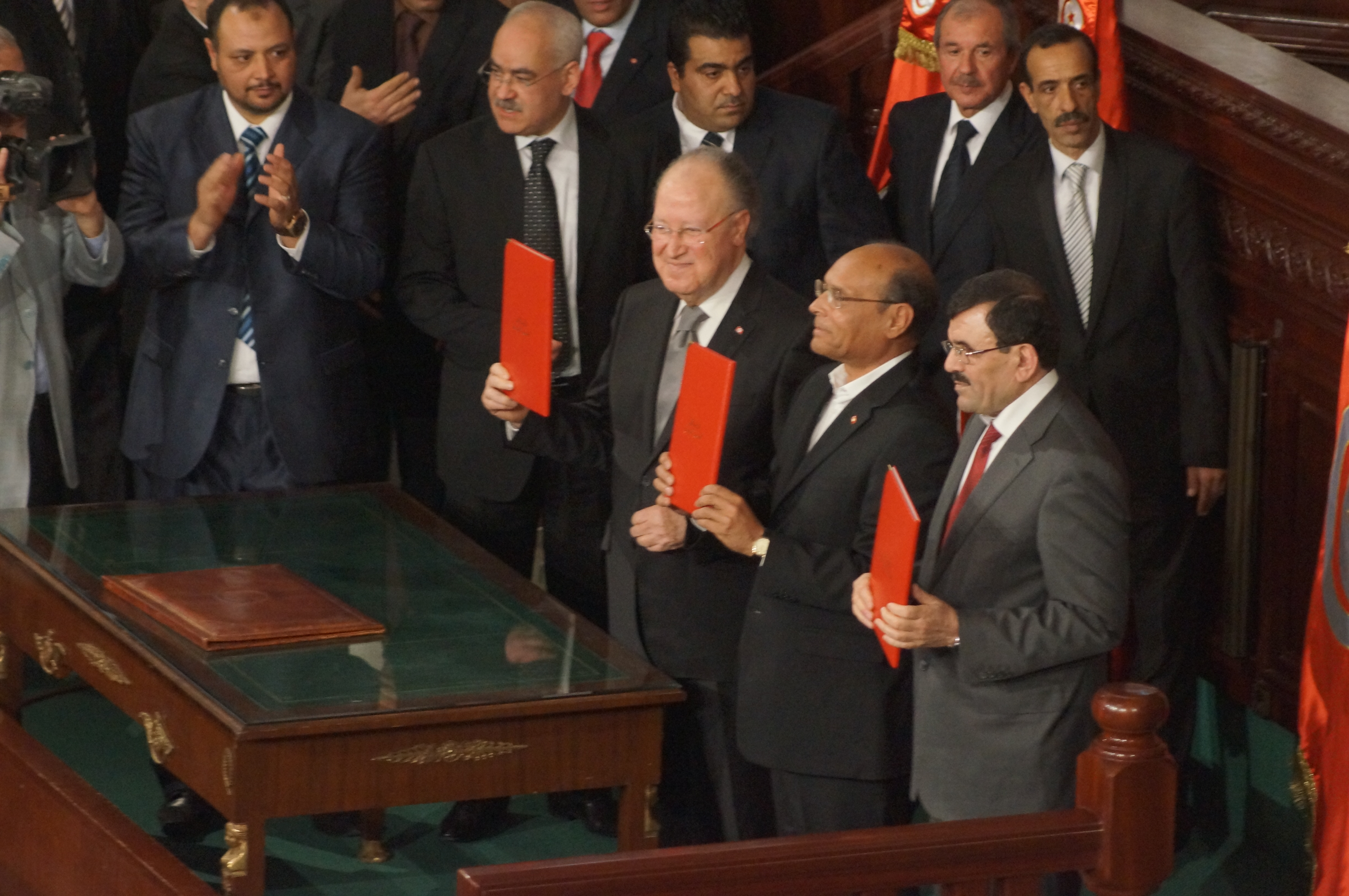
The three presidents at the signing ceremony of the new constitution, from right to left: the head of government Ali Laarayedh, the president of the republic Moncef Marzouki, the president of the Constituent Assembly Mustapha Ben Jafar.

On 23 October 2011, a Constituent Assembly was elected to draft the text of a new constitution. On 16 December 2011, they issued a constitutive law

Law on the provisional organization of public authorities, which superseded the Legislative Decree of 23 March 2011 and the 1959 constitution. This law provided for three branches of government and guaranteed human rights during the time it takes for the new constitution to be written and ratified. Many Tunisian intellectuals and political commentators felt compelled to comment on the progress of both the transitional government as well as the various stages of the constitution. Dr. Mohamed-Salah Omri, a professor at St. John's College, University of Oxford said, with regards to post revolutionary transitional period, that "the transfer of power in the early days of 2011 and the several transitional phases since then reveal much about the power of constitutionalism in the country. One may indeed speak of an orderly, leaderless transfer of power in January 2011 specifically because constitutionalism was strong and alive."

It was initially hoped that a constitution would be drafted within a year's time. However, vigorous debate and two assassinations delayed the document. Progress quickened after the ruling Islamist Ennahda party agreed to give up power when a new constitution was passed. After two years of work, a 146-article draft constitution was completed. It was put to a vote on 26 January 2014, requiring a two-thirds majority to pass. The Constituent Assembly adopted the document by a 200–12 vote with 4 abstentions. President Marzouki remarked: "With the birth of this text, we confirm our victory over dictatorship", and signed it into law the following day.

During the drafting process, the main points of contention were the role of religion in the government, the requirements to run for president, and the details of how the transition period after the document was passed would be handled. The new constitution makes Tunisia a decentralized and open government. It recognizes Islam as the official state religion, but protects freedom of belief. It provides for some restrictions on free speech, most notably in banning attacks on religion and accusations of being a non-believer. The constitution provides for gender equality in rights and responsibilities, protects the nation's natural resources and demands the government take steps to fight corruption. Executive power is divided between the president and prime minister. A newly selected cabinet led by former minister Mehdi Jomaa will oversee the country until elections are held to select a president. The 2014 parliamentary election was held on 26 October 2014.

While the 2014 Tunisian Constitution and its outcomes were met with various reactions across the globe and among Tunisians both at home and in the diaspora, a summary of the process and outcomes can be found in the following article.

=== Constitution of 2022 ===
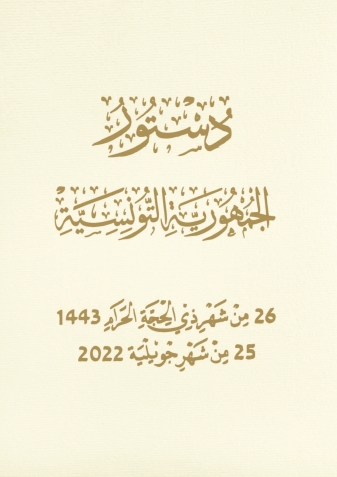
The outer cover of the Constitution of the Republic of Tunisia 2022.

In September 2021, President Kaïs Saïed announced an upcoming reform of the 2014 Constitution. It's acted by the Presidential Decree n° 2021-117 of 22 September 2021. On 25 May 2022, he issued a decree for change of constitution by July 25. A constitutional referendum was scheduled for 25 July 2022. After the referendum results indicated that 90% of voters supported Saied, he emerged as victorious and promised that Tunisia will enter the new phase after he got the unlimited power. Out of the 30.50% of registered voters who voted on the referendum, 94.6% of votes were in favor for the constitutional change and 5.4% were against. Additionally, 0.06% of the votes were blank.

The new Constitution establishes a presidential regime and a bicameral parliament. Bills tabled by the President are given priority consideration. The president appoints the government without needing a vote of confidence from parliament. For a motion of censure to be adopted, it must be voted on by two-thirds of the members of the two chambers of Parliament sitting in joint session. Binationals can no longer be presidential candidates.

The President of the Constitutional Court is in charge of the presidential interim. MPs are barred from introducing bills making alterations to the budget and can be revoked. The President appoints the members of the Constitutional Court and Tunisia is described as a member of the "Islamic Ummah" and the "State alone must work for the realization of the purposes of Islam". The Superior Council of the Judiciary is abolished and replaced by three councils for each of the three judicial orders.
