= Habiba Zehi Ben Romdhane =

Tunisian politician

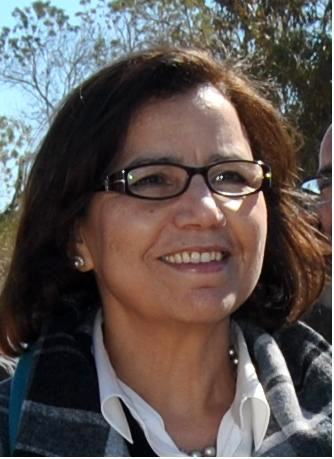

Minister of Health of Tunisia
- In office 27 January 2011 – 1 July 2011
- President: Fouad Mebazaa (Acting)
- Prime Minister: Mohamed Ghannouchi; Béji Caïd Essebsi
- Preceded by: Mustapha Ben Jafar
- Succeeded by: Slaheddine Sellami

Personal details
- Born: March 19, 1950 (age 76) El Ksar, Tunisia
- Party: Independent
- Education: Tunis University; University of Tokyo; Université Laval; University of Chicago

Habiba Zehi Ben Romdhane is a Tunisian medical professional. She was Tunisia's health minister. She took office in the interim Tunisian government which began on January 28, 2011, after protests had dislodged a longstanding authoritarian government.

== Biography ==
Habiba Zehi Ben Romdhane earned a public health degree from the Faculty of Medicine at the University of Tunis (1978) and trained further in public health at Laval University (1979), the University of Chicago (1981) and the University of Tokyo (1988). She is a professor of preventive medicine with the Faculty of Medicine at the University of Tunis and head of the Laboratory for Research on the epidemiology and prevention of cardiovascular diseases and has worked with the World Health Organization. In 2001, she received the Award of Maghreb societies of Medical Sciences. She is a founding member of the Tunisian League of Epidemiology, and other national and international medical societies.

Habiba Zehi Ben Romdhane cofounded the Tunisian Association of Democratic Women and the Tunisian Association for Development Research, and the Tunisian chapter of Amnesty International.

Habiba Zehi Ben Romdhane was born in 1950 in El Ksar in the Gafsa Governorate of Tunisia. Her husband, Mahmoud Ben Romdhane, is an economist and a member of the Ettajdid Movement political party.

== Distinctions ==
- 2001: Prize from the Maghreb Societies of Medical Sciences
