= Mustapha Ben Jafar =

Tunisian politician and medical doctor

Mustapha Ben Jaâfar
- مصطفى بن جعفر
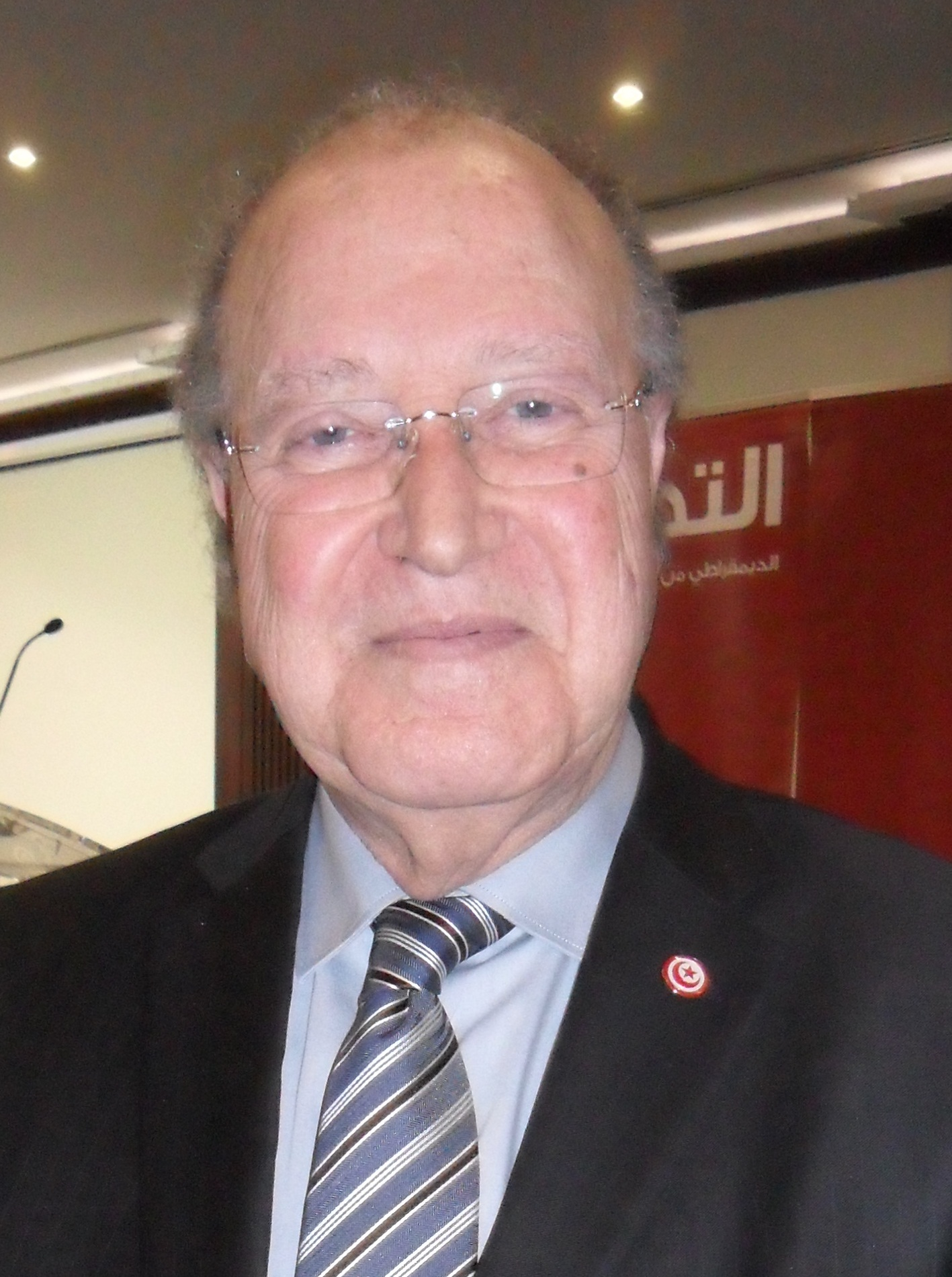
- Ben Jaâfar in 2013

Speaker of the Constituent Assembly
- In office 22 November 2011 – 2 December 2014
- Preceded by: Sahbi Karoui (Acting Speaker of the Chamber of Deputies); Mekki Aloui (Acting Speaker of the Chamber of Advisors)
- Succeeded by: Mohamed Ennaceur (Speaker of the Assembly of the Representatives of the People)

Minister of Health
- In office 17 January 2011 – 27 January 2011
- President: Fouad Mebazaa (Acting)
- Prime Minister: Mohamed Ghannouchi
- Preceded by: Mondher Zenaidi
- Succeeded by: Habiba Zehi Ben Romdhane

Secretary General of Ettakatol
- Incumbent
- Assumed office 25 October 2002
- Preceded by: Position established

Personal details
- Born: 8 December 1940 (age 85) Tunis, Tunisia
- Party: Democratic Forum for Labour and Liberties

Mustapha Ben Jaâfar (Arabic: مصطفى بن جعفر; born 8 December 1940) is a Tunisian politician and medical doctor who was Speaker of the Constituent Assembly of Tunisia from November 2011 to December 2014. He founded and has led the Democratic Forum for Labour and Liberties (FDTL), a political party, since 1994.

== Biography ==
Ben Jaâfar was born in 1940 in Tunis. He attended Sadiki College from 1950–1956, then studied medicine in France to become a radiologist. In 1970 he returned to Tunisia, joined the University of Tunis's medical faculty and worked also at the university hospital. In 1976 he was one of the founders of a weekly opinion magazine and an organization that evolved into the Tunisian Human Rights League (LTDH).

In 1978 he joined others to start a political party, the Movement of Socialist Democrats (MDS). The MDS was the largest opposition party as of 1991 and the ruling party made an apparent attempt to work with the MDS as a "participatory opposition." Ben Jaâfar was the secretary-general of the MDS in 1992, and ran for the top MDS office, but lost to Mohamed Moadda, and resigned from the party because it seemed to have cooperated with the ruling party so much (receiving a government subsidy and accommodations) and achieved so little.

In 1994 Ben Jaâfar founded the Democratic Forum for Labour and Liberties party (abbreviated FDTL and also called Ettakatol). It was not legally recognized until 2002. He attempted to run for the presidency in 2009 as the FDTL candidate but was disqualified and was in any case widely understood to have no chance to win against the established authoritarian incumbent president Ben Ali.

=== Post-revolutionary life ===
Turbulent protests in January 2011 drove President Ben Ali from the country, and Prime Minister Mohamed Ghannouchi included Ben Jaâfar as Minister of Health in an interim government beginning 17 January 2011. Along with other minority party members, Ben Jaâfar resigned within days as public protests continued against the continued dominance of the RCD party in government. Ben Jaâfar was succeeded as health minister by Habiba Zehi Ben Romdhane.

In the October 2011 elections to the Constituent Assembly Ben Jaâfar's party placed fourth and he was elected to a seat in the Constituent Assembly. Supported by his own party, Ben Jaâfar was considered a possible candidate for President in the wake of the election, receiving open consideration from Ennahda, which had received a plurality of seats. The leading parties agreed instead on a power-sharing arrangement according to which Ben Jafar would be named Speaker of the Constituent Assembly. He was elected to that post by the Assembly when it met on 22 November 2011, receiving 145 votes against 68 for opposition candidate Maya Jribi.

== Published works ==
- Un si long chemin vers la démocratie, ed. Nirvana, Tunis, 2014

Political offices
Preceded by Sahbi Karoui as Speaker of the Chamber of Deputies	Speaker of the Constituent Assembly; 2011–2014	Succeeded by Mohamed Ennaceur as President of the Assembly of the Representatives of the People
Preceded by Mekki Aloui as Speaker of the Chamber of Advisors	Speaker of the Constituent Assembly; 2011–2014	Succeeded by Mohamed Ennaceur as President of the Assembly of the Representatives of the People
