= Tunisian Constitution of 2014 =

Supreme law of Tunisia from 2014 to 2022

- Original title: 2014 دستور تونس
- Created: 26 January 2014
- Ratified: 27 January 2014
- Superseded: 25 July 2022
- Author: Constituent Assembly of Tunisia
- Purpose: To replace the Tunisian Constitution of 1959

The Tunisian Constitution of 2014 (Arabic: 2014 دستور تونس) was adopted on 26 January 2014 by the Constituent Assembly, elected on 23 October 2011 in the wake of Tunisia's Jasmine Revolution that overthrew President Zine El Abidine Ben Ali. It was passed on 10 February 2014, replacing the constitutional law of 16 December 2011 that temporarily formed the basis of government after the suspension of the Constitution of 1959.

The Supreme Law of the State, it is the third Constitution of the country's modern history after the Constitutions of 1861 and 1959.

== History ==
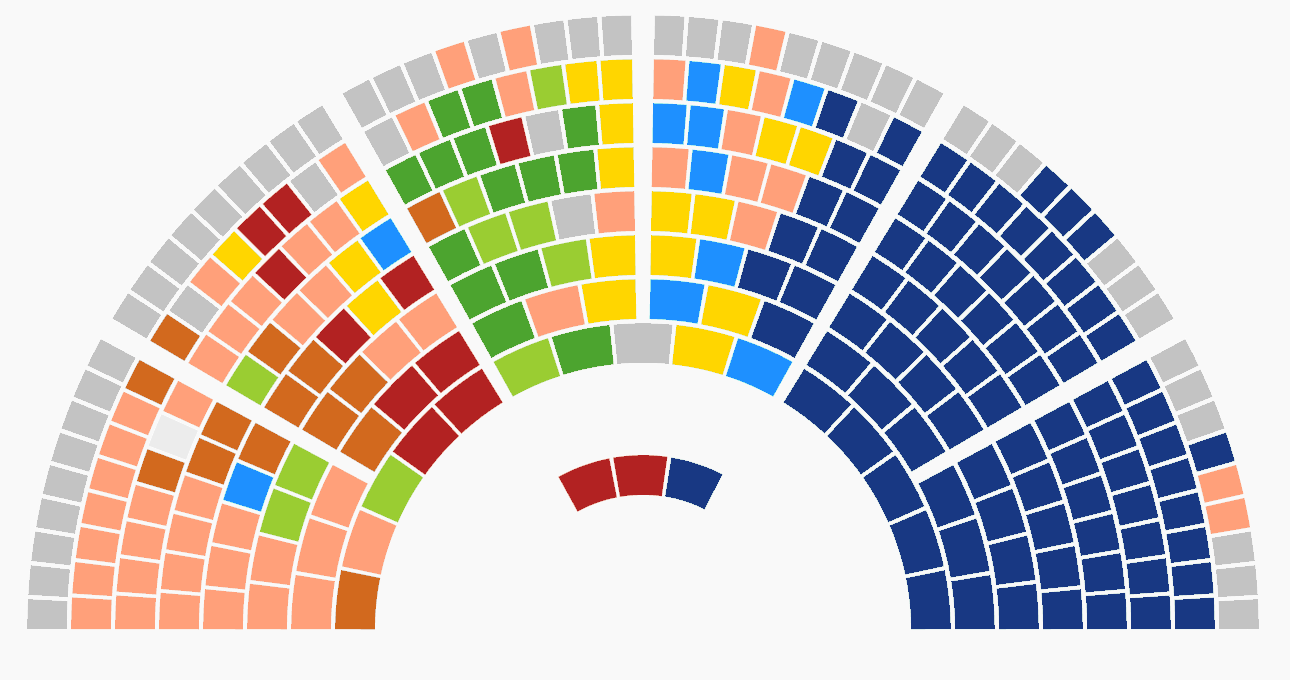
National Assembly's composition by parliamentary groups (2014) Ennahda (89) Independent (53) Democratic Bloc (18) Congress for the Republic (16) Democratic Transition (13) Ettakatol (13) Democratic Alliance (12) Wafa Movement (10)

The articles of the Constitution were debated one by one at a plenary session, from December 2013 to January 2014, in a context of heated debate, which delayed the review. The final text was adopted on 26 January 2014 by the Constituent Assembly with 200 votes for, 12 against and four abstentions. The next day, the text was signed by the interim president, Moncef Marzouki, the President of the Constituent Assembly, Mustapha Ben Jaafar, and the Head of Government out, Ali Larayedh, during a ceremony at the headquarters of the Assembly.

This Constitution is the result of a compromise between the Islamist party Ennahdha (head of government) and the opposition forces. It provides for shared executive powers, gives preference to Islam and, for the first time in legal history of the North Africa, introduced a target parity between men and women in elected bodies. Also for the first time, the text adopted the principle of proportionality in a limitations clause.

In September 2021, Kaïs Saïed announced an upcoming reform of the 2014 Constitution. It occurred on 22 September 2021, with promulgation of the presidential decree n° 2021-117.

== Articles ==
This description of the Tunisian Constitution of 2014 draws on its unofficial English translation.

=== Preamble ===
In the Name of God, the Merciful, the Compassionate

We, the representatives of the Tunisian people, members of the National Constituent Assembly,

[...]

We, in the name of the Tunisian people, with the help of God, draft this Constitution.

The preamble to the Constitution recalls the struggle of Tunisians for independence in 1956 as the fight for democracy led during the Jasmine Revolution of 14 January 2011. The preamble affirms the people's attachment to human rights and to its Arab-Muslim identity. It describes Tunisia as a republican and democratic civil state based on law, where sovereignty belongs to the people and the principle of separation of powers is guaranteed. The preamble also states that Tunisia must participate in the unification of the Arab world and support liberation movements, including the Palestinian movement. Finally, the preamble states that the Tunisian people must contribute to sustainable development, to world peace and solidarity among the members of humanity.

=== General principles ===
Article 1 : Tunisia is a free, independent, sovereign state; its religion is Islam, its language Arabic, and its system is republican. This article may not be amended.

Article 2 : Tunisia is a civil state based on citizenship, the will of the people, and the supremacy of law. This article may not be amended.

The third article of the Tunisian Constitution provides that the people is the bearer of sovereignty. Article 4 defines the official flag and national anthem of the state. The ancient motto - "Liberty, Justice and Order" - is replaced by : "Liberty, Dignity, Justice and Order". Tunisia contributes to the unification of the Arab Maghreb. Article 6 provides that the state is the guardian of religion; it also guarantees freedom of conscience and political neutrality of mosques and other places of worship. Apostasy campaigns and incitements to hatred and violence are prohibited.

Participation in national service and paying taxes are duties for all citizens. International treaties approved by the Assembly of the Representatives of the People override all other laws but are subjects to the Constitution.

=== Rights and freedoms ===
In the Constitution of 1959, the rights and freedoms were only presented in summary form; the detail was set out in individual laws.

Article 31 says, "Freedom of opinion, thought, expression, information and publication shall be guaranteed. These freedoms shall not be subject to prior censorship."

Under Article 39, education is mandatory until the age of 16. In this regard, the State has the duty "to embed youth in the Arab-Islamic identity and their national belonging; strengthen and promote the Arabic language and expand its usage; instill openness to foreign languages and human civilisations; and spread the culture of human rights."

Article 49 provides that the law defines the terms surrounding the rights and freedoms enumerated in the Constitution and it supervises them in a spirit of proportionality, to ensure the rights and freedoms of others and to protect the public interest. The same article states that "No amendment that undermines any human rights acquisitions or freedoms guaranteed in this Constitution is allowed."

=== Legislative power ===
Under Article 50 of the Constitution, the legislative power is exercised by the people through the elected members of the Assembly of the Representatives of the People and referendum.

==== Assembly of the Representatives of the People ====
The Tunisian Parliament is unicameral and is elected for a term of 5 years. Article 60 guarantees the rights of the parliamentary opposition in the Assembly of the Representatives of the People.

Any Tunisian citizen who is at least 18 years of age has the right to vote; Tunisians resident abroad must also enjoy this right and have their own representation in Parliament. Anyone who has held Tunisian nationality for at least 10 years and is at least 23 years old may be a candidate in parliamentary elections.

The right of initiative belongs to the President of the Republic, the Head of Government, as well as at least 10 deputies. The Head of Government alone can present bills of financial nature or aiming to ratify an international treaty. Ordinary bills are adopted by a simple majority of the deputies. The draft organic laws are adopted by an absolute majority of the members of the Assembly.

No member of the Assembly of the Representatives of the People can be prosecuted for acts or words spoken in connection with his parliamentary duties. Every member is also immune to prosecution for a criminal offense while in office unless his parliamentary immunity is lifted.

When the Assembly is dissolved, the President may, with the agreement of the head of government, rule by decree. The decree-laws adopted by the President must then be approved by the new Assembly at its first regular session. The Assembly of the Representatives of the People may also grant the Head of Government for a period can not be longer than two months, the power to issue decree-laws; the support of three-fifths of the members is required for the award of such power. No decree can undermine the electoral system.

=== Executive power ===
Executive power is exercised jointly by the President and the Head of Government.

==== The President of the Republic ====
The President of the Republic of Tunisia is elected by direct universal suffrage for a term of 5 years. Anyone aged at least 35 years, Muslim, holding Tunisian nationality since birth and with no other nationality - or formally committing to renounce any other nationality - may be a candidate in the Tunisian presidential election. In accordance with Article 75 of the Constitution, no person may serve more than two terms in office, whether successive or separate; this provision can not be amended to increase the number of terms that can be served by the same President.

The President is the Head of State; he defines the general policies of national security, international relations and defense. He appoints the General Mufti of the Republic of Tunisia, the President of the Central Bank, as well as senior post holders in the presidency, the diplomatic service, national security and defense. He promulgates laws adopted by the Assembly of the Representatives of the People and may request further deliberations. He may also, if interest warrants, subject laws to referendum. President can dissolve the Tunisian parliament before its term. When the country is in danger, the President may temporarily assume extraordinary powers. The Assembly of the Representatives of the People may decide by a majority of two thirds of its members, to end the mandate of the President in case of violation of the Constitution.

==== The Head of Government ====
The Tunisian government is composed of the Head of Government and ministers and secretaries of state appointed by him; the appointment of Ministers of Foreign Affairs and of Defence is made in agreement with the President of the Republic. The Head of the Tunisian Government is normally appointed by the president from among the members of the political party or electoral coalition having obtained the largest number of seats in the parliamentary election. No one can be both a member of the government and of the Assembly of the Representatives of the People. The government is responsible to the Assembly.

In accordance with Article 101 of the Constitution, jurisdictional disputes between the president and the Head of Government may be resolved by the Constitutional Court within a week.

=== Judicial power ===
The judiciary is independent and neutral. Judges enjoy immunity from prosecution. The free and independent exercise of the legal profession is guaranteed.

==== Justice system, administrative and financial judiciary ====
Judges are appointed by decree of the President on the advice of the Supreme Judicial Council; appointments to high office are made in consultation with the Head of Government.

Judges can not be dismissed or suspended; they can not be transferred without their consent. Disciplinary sanctions fall under the Supreme Judicial Council.

Everyone has the right to a fair trial within a reasonable time and has the right to appeal the judgment. Court hearings are public.

Any interference in the work of justice is prohibited. The creation of special courts is not permitted; Military courts have jurisdiction only to prosecute military crimes.

Court decisions are made on behalf of the people and are executed in the name of the President of the Republic.

===== The Supreme Judicial Council =====
The Supreme Judicial Council consists of four components: the Judiciary Council, the administrative Judicial Council, the Financial Judicial Council, and the General Assembly of the three judicial councils. Each organ is composed two-thirds of magistrates elected or appointed to official functions, with the remaining third being composed of non-judicial independent experts. The majority of members of these bodies are to be elected; their term of office is six years and is not renewable.

The General Assembly of the three judicial councils decides on bills concerning the judicial system. The three councils decide on matters concerning the career and discipline of judges. The Supreme Judicial Council prepares an annual report and send a copy to the President of the Republic, the head of government, and the President of the Assembly of the Representatives of the People.

===== The judicial system =====
The judiciary consists courts of first instance, courts of second instance and the Court of Cassation. The Court of Cassation must submit and publish an annual report. Public prosecution is part of the judicial system.

===== Administrative judiciary =====
The administrative judiciary consists of administrative courts of first instance, administrative courts of second degree and of the Supreme Administrative Court. The Supreme Administrative Court must submit a published annual report. Administrative justice has jurisdiction over administrative disputes and exercises a consultative jurisdiction in accordance with the law.

===== Financial judiciary =====
The financial judiciary consists of the Court of Audit and its various bodies. The Court of Audit provides an annual report which must be published. If necessary, it prepares specific reports. The Court of Audit is competent to advise the executive and legislative powers in the enforcement of financial laws. It also ensures proper management of public funds.

==== The Constitutional Court ====
Between 1987 and 2011, Tunisia had a Constitutional Council, created by presidential decree by Ben Ali and brought within the scope of the constitution in 1995. However, only the President of the Republic had the power to nominate its members. This Constitutional Council was dissolved by the Decree of 23 March 2011, following the Tunisian Revolution.

The Constitution of 2014 provides for a newly-constituted Constitutional Court. It consists of 12 members, who must have 20 years' experience in order to serve for a single term of 9 years. Two thirds are specialized in law. The President of the Republic, the President of the Assembly of the Representatives of the People and the Supreme Judicial Council each propose four candidates; the Assembly of the Representatives of the People approves nominations with a three-fifths majority. The Constitutional Court appoints a president and a vice president, both specialized in law.

The Constitutional Court can only rule on the constitutionality of:

- Bills submitted by the President of the Republic, the Head of Government or 30 elected Assembly of the Representatives of the People
- Proposals to amend the Constitution submitted by the President of the Republic
- International treaties submitted by the President of the Republic
- Laws submitted by the courts
- The Rules of Procedure of the Assembly of the Representatives of the People submitted by its president.

=== Independent constitutional bodies ===
The Constitution creates several independent constitutional bodies. They enjoy financial and administrative autonomy. Their members are appointed by the Assembly of the Representatives of the People and each of them must submit an annual report to the Assembly. Instances are five in number:

- the Independent High Authority for Elections
- the Independent High Authority of Audiovisual Communication
- the Human Rights Commission
- the Commission for Sustainable Development and the Rights of Future Generations and
- the Good Governance and Anti-Corruption Commission.

=== Local government ===
Tunisia is divided into Governorates, Delegations (regions) and municipalities in accordance with the law. Municipal and regional councils are elected by universal suffrage; Governorate councils are elected by members of municipal and regional councils. Local authorities are represented by the High Council of Local Authorities; its president may participate in the deliberations of the Assembly of the Representatives of the People. Administrative Justice is responsible for resolving conflicts between local and central government.

=== Amending the Constitution ===
The Constitution may be reviewed, on the initiative of one third of MPs or the President of the Republic. Any proposed revision of the Constitution is subject to review by the Constitutional Court; it ensures that the proposed revision does not affect items the modification of which is prohibited by the Constitution, namely Articles 1, 2, Chapter II and Article 75 imposing presidential term limits. The review must be approved by two thirds of the members of the Assembly of the Representatives of the People, and then be submitted to a referendum.

=== Final provisions ===
The preamble is an integral part of the Constitution; all articles of this latter form an integrated whole. The Constitution comes into force upon its publication in the Official Gazette by the President of the National Constituent Assembly.

=== Transitional provisions ===
Under Chapter X, several articles of interim constitutional law are set out, specifying the times for holding the first parliamentary and presidential elections. The Supreme Judicial Council is also to be established no later than six months after the legislative elections. Constitutional authority is in the meantime to be exercised by an interim body composed of the President of the Court of Cassation, the President of the Administrative Court, the President of the Court of Audit and three other legal experts appointed by the President, the Head of Government and the president of the National Constituent Assembly. The Constitutional Court is to be instituted within one year after the legislative elections. Finally, the first two partial renewals of the Constitutional Court, the Elections Commission, the Audio-Visual Communication Commission and the Good Governance and Anti-Corruption Commission are to be achieved by drawing lots among the members of the first cohort of members.

== See also ==
- Constitution of Tunisia
- Politics of Tunisia
