= Mekki Aloui =

Tunisian politician

President of the Chamber of Advisors

Mekki Aloui (Arabic: مكي العلوي, romanized: Makkī al-ʻAlawī) is a Tunisian politician who was the last President of the Chamber of Advisors serving on an acting basis from 7 February 2011 until the chamber was suspended and abolished and replaced by a unicameral Constituent Assembly on 22 November 2011. He previously served as the vice-president of the Chamber of Advisors.
