= Independent High Authority for Elections =

Independent Supreme Authority for Elections
- الهيئة العليا المستقلة للانتخابات; Instance supérieure indépendante pour les élections

Agency overview
- Formed: April 18, 2011
- Preceding agency: Ministry of the Interior
- Jurisdiction: Tunisia
- Headquarters: Tunis, Tunisia; 36°50′52.4″N 10°16′28.5″E
- Agency executive: Nabil Baffoun, President
- Website: www.isie.tn

The Independent Supreme Authority for Elections (Arabic: الهيئة العليا المستقلة للانتخابات al-Hay’a al-‘Ulyā al-Mustaqilla lil-’Intikhābāt, French: Instance supérieure indépendante pour les élections or ISIE pronounced [iˈzi]) is a government agency in charge of organizing and supervising elections and referendums in Tunisia.

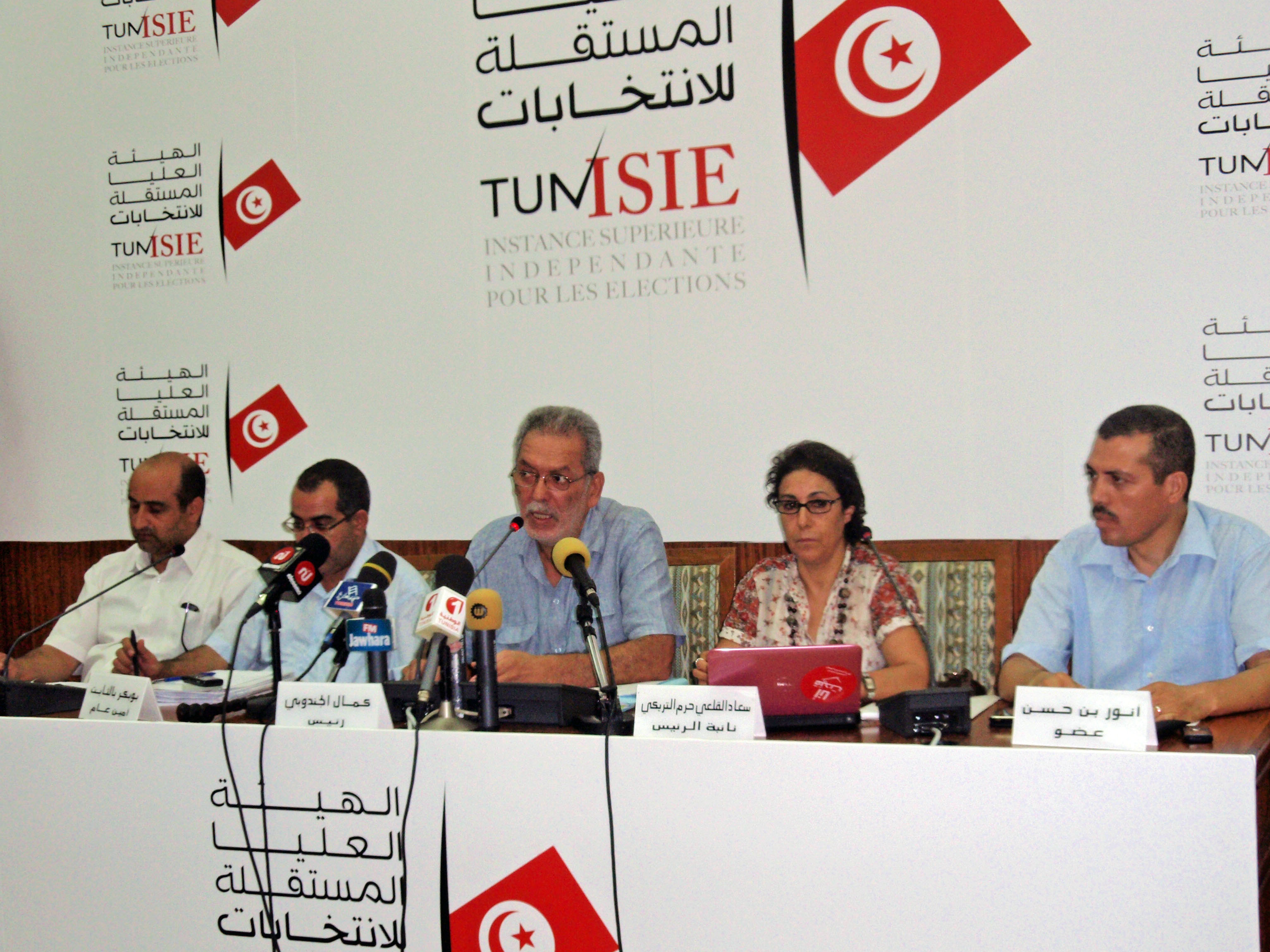
ISIE Press Conference led by then-president Kamel Jendoubi on 16 August 2011
