= Official Gazette of the Republic of Tunisia =

Government gazette of Tunisia

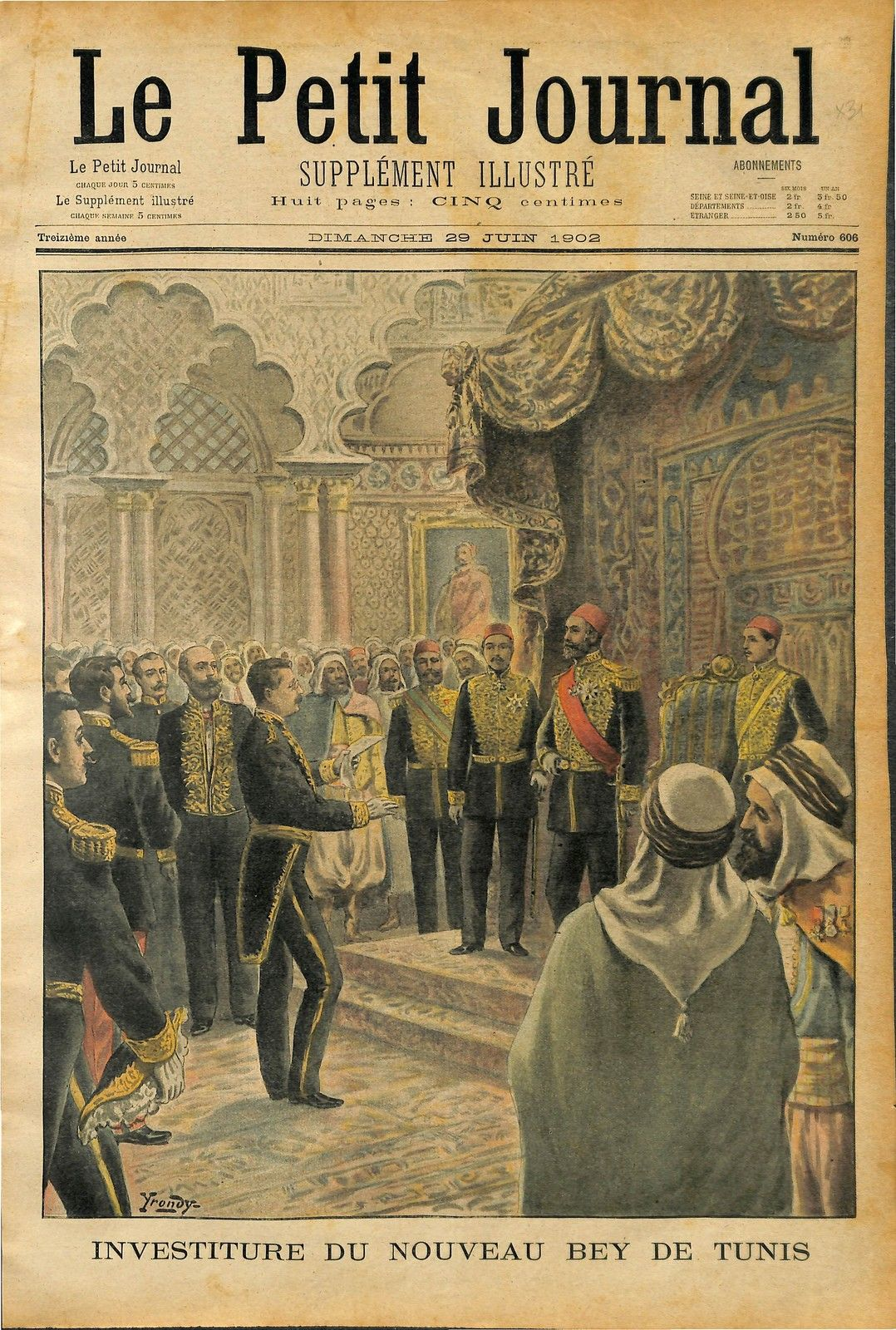
1902 Issue of the Journal, Investiture of the Bey of Tunis

Official Journal of the Republic of Tunisia (الرائد الرسمي للجمهورية التونسية), also abbreviated JORT, is the official biweekly published by the Tunisian state in which are recorded all legislative events (laws and decrees), regulations, and official statements legal publications. The first Official Journal, of 22 July 1860, appeared under the title of Arra'id Attunisi (الرائد التونسي). Later, known as the Arra'id Arrasmi Attunisi (الرائد الرسمي التونسي) or Tunisian Official Journal. The title carries JORT July 26, 1957 after the proclamation of the republic.

The JORT is published every Tuesday and Friday by the Official Press of the Republic of Tunisia. A French version is the official texts published since 1883 but, in accordance with Law No. 93-64 of 5 July 1993, only the Arabic text is authentic; the French language is only informative.

The date of publication in JORT conditions generally the date on which the text has legal effects - since it is necessary that a text is known to be applicable - unless the text itself indicates a deadline for implementation. Articles of laws referring to implementing regulations can not take effect until the decrees are in turn published in JORT.

The complete collection of JORT, from its first publication in Arabic and French, is available at the headquarters of the National Archives of Tunisia. This collection also includes the original legislation and regulations published.
