= Chamber of Advisors =

Upper house of the Parliament of Tunisia

Chamber of Advisors مجلس المستشارين Mejlis el-Musteshērīn

Type
- Type: upper house of the Parliament of Tunisia

History
- Founded: 2005
- Disbanded: March 23, 2011

Meeting place
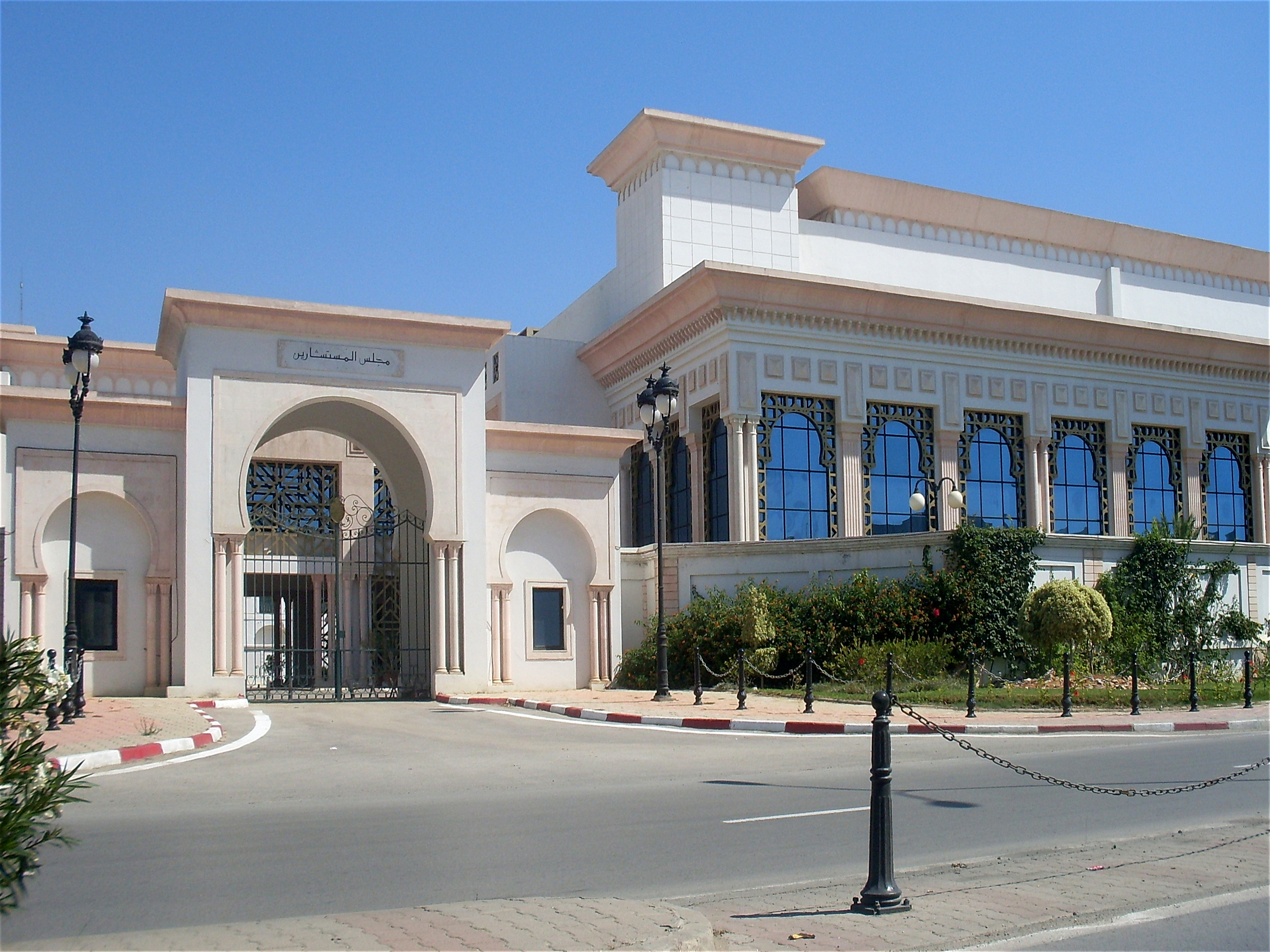

The Chamber of Advisors (Arabic: مجلس المستشارين, Mejlis el-Musteshērīn), also called Chamber of Councillors, was the upper house of the Parliament of Tunisia. It was created by a 2002 amendment to the Tunisian constitution and was replaced by a unicameral Assembly of the Representatives of the People by the 2014 constitution. Members served 6 year terms. By law, it had two thirds the number of members as the Chamber of Deputies.

The initial chamber, appointed in 2005, consisted of 126 members; 71 members were chosen by the Chamber of Deputies and city councils, 14 were to be chosen by the Tunisian General Labour Union, and the other 41 were appointed by the President of Tunisia. However, the UGTT boycotted the selection, and those 14 seats remained vacant.

There were 8 women appointed by the Chamber of Deputies, and another 7 women appointed by the President.

Mekki Aloui was the last president (a.i.) of Chamber of Advisors of Tunisia, taking office on February 7, 2011.

== See also ==
- President of the Chamber of Advisors
