= Outline of Tunisia =

Overview of and topical guide to Tunisia

The Flag of Tunisia

The Coat of arms of Tunisia

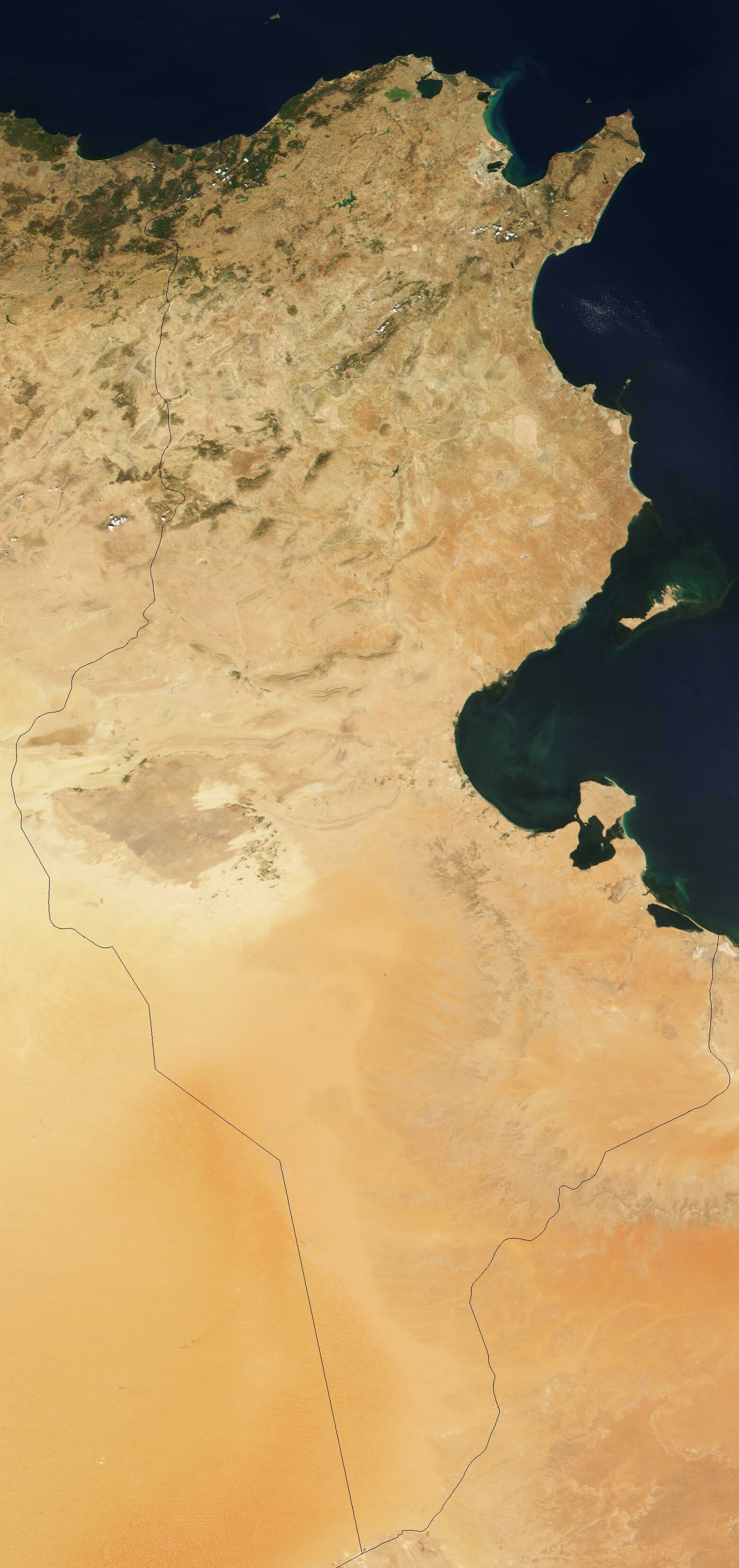
Satellite image of Tunisia, in summer

The following outline is provided as an overview of and topical guide to Tunisia:

Tunisia – northernmost country in Africa situated on the southern coast of the Mediterranean Sea. Tunisia is the smallest of the nations situated along the Atlas Mountains. The south of the country is composed of the Sahara desert, with much of the remainder consisting of particularly fertile soil and 1,300 kilometres (810 mi) of coastline. In ancient times, Tunisia was the home of the famous Phoenician city of Carthage.

== General reference ==
- Pronunciation: US: /tjuːˈniːʒə/ tew-NEE-zhə, UK: /tjuːˈnɪziə/ tew-NIZ-ee-ə; Arabic: تونس [tuːnis], Berber: Tunes)
- Common English country name: Tunisia
- Official English country name: The Tunisian Republic
- Adjectival(s): Tunisian
- Etymology: Name of Tunisia
- International rankings of Tunisia
- ISO country codes: TN, TUN, 788
- ISO region codes: See ISO 3166-2:TN
- Internet country code top-level domain: .tn

== Geography of Tunisia ==
Geography of Tunisia

- Tunisia is: a country
- Location
  - Tunisia is situated within the following regions:
    - Northern Hemisphere and Eastern Hemisphere
    - Africa
      - Sahara Desert
      - North Africa
        - Maghreb
  - Time zone: UTC+01
  - Extreme points of Tunisia
    - High: Jebel ech Chambi 1,544 m (5,066 ft)
    - Low: Shatt al Gharsah −17 m (−56 ft)
  - Land boundaries: 1,424 km

Algeria 965 km
Libya 459 km

- Coastline: Mediterranean Sea 1,148 km

- Population of Tunisia: 10,327,000 – 79th most populous country
- Area of Tunisia: 163610 km^{2}
- Atlas of Tunisia

=== Environment of Tunisia ===
- Climate of Tunisia
- Ecoregions in Tunisia
- Protected areas of Tunisia
  - Biosphere reserves in Tunisia
  - National parks of Tunisia
- Wildlife of Tunisia
  - Fauna of Tunisia
    - Birds of Tunisia
    - Mammals of Tunisia

==== Natural geographic features of Tunisia ====
- Cap Bon (also known as Sharik Peninsula)
- Ras ben Sakka (northernmost point of Africa)
- Strait of Sicily
- World Heritage Sites in Tunisia

===== Gulfs of Tunisia =====
The capital city of Tunis lies at the southern edge of the Gulf of Tunis.

- Gulf of Gabès
- Gulf of Hammamet
- Gulf of Tunis

===== Islands of Tunisia =====
- Djerba
- Galite Islands
- Kerkennah Islands
  - Chergui
  - Gharbi
- Zembra

===== Lakes of Tunisia =====
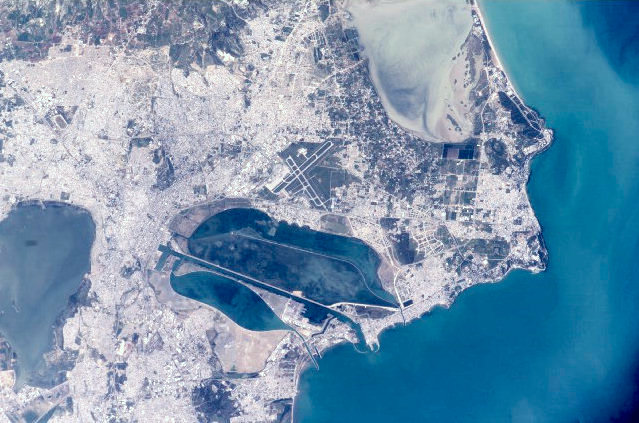
The Lake of Tunis is a natural lagoon located between the capital city of Tunis and the Gulf of Tunis.

- Ichkeul Lake
- Lake Tritonis (former lake)
- Lake of Tunis (lagoon)
- Tunisian salt lakes
  - Chott el Djerid (salt lake)

===== Mountains of Tunisia =====
- Atlas Mountains
- Aurès Mountains
- Jebel ech Chambi (highest mountain in Tunisia–1,544 m (5,066 ft))
- Djebel Zaghouan

===== Rivers of Tunisia =====
- Medjerda River (longest river of Tunisia)

=== Regions of Tunisia ===
==== Administrative divisions of Tunisia ====
Governorates of Tunisia

Governorates of Tunisia

Key	Governorate
1	Ariana
2	Béja
3	Ben Arous
4	Bizerte
5	Gabès
6	Gafsa
7	Jendouba
8	Kairouan
9	Kasserine
10	Kebili
11	Kef
12	Mahdia
13	Manouba
14	Medenine
15	Monastir
16	Nabeul
17	Sfax
18	Sidi Bouzid
19	Siliana
20	Sousse
21	Tataouine
22	Tozeur
23	Tunis
24	Zaghouan

Delegations of Tunisia

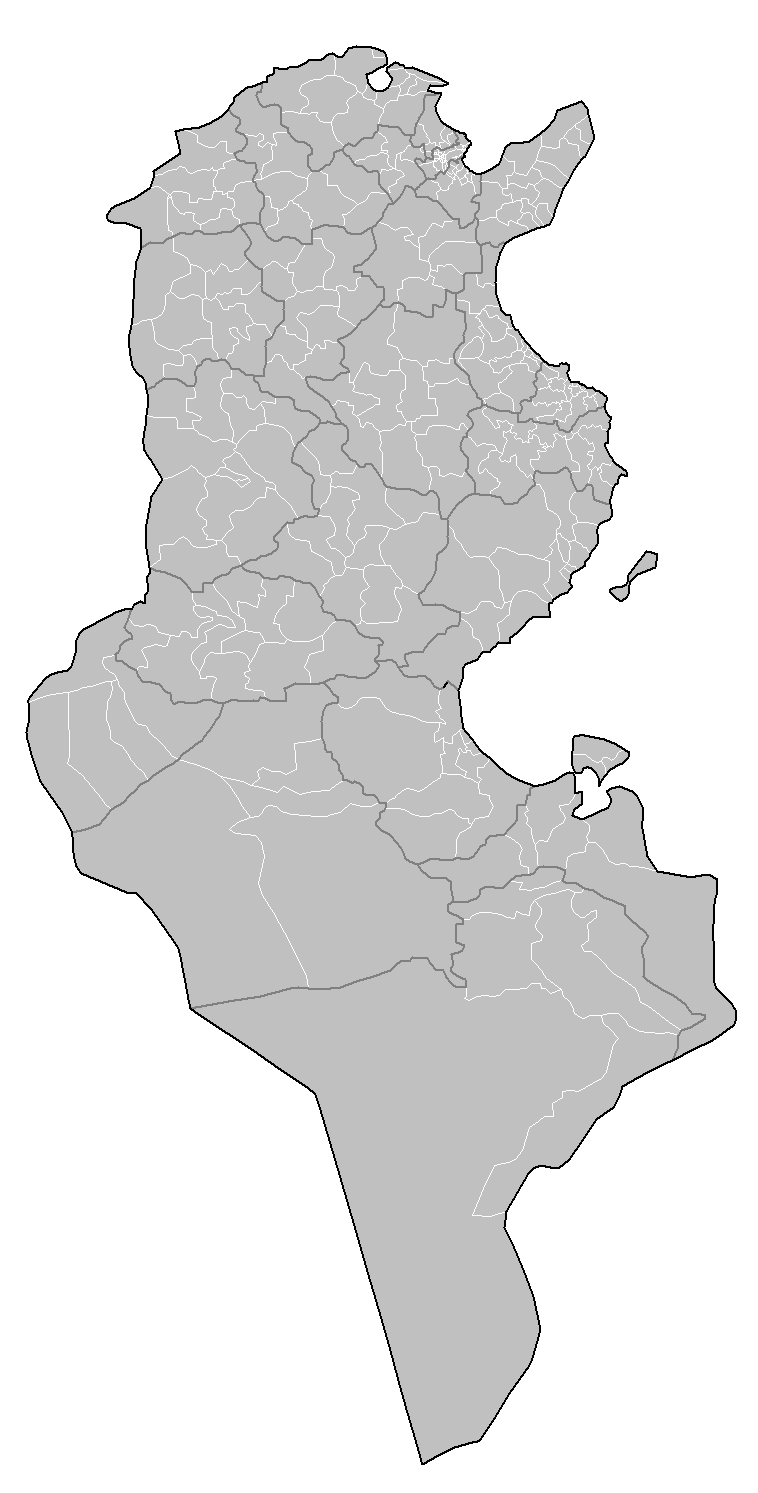
Delegations of Tunisia

The governorates of Tunisia are divided into 262 "delegations" or "districts" (mutamadiyat).

List of cities in Tunisia

- Tunis
- Sfax

=== Demography of Tunisia ===
Demographics of Tunisia

- Berber Jews
  - History of the Jews in Tunisia
- Mrazig

== Government and politics of Tunisia ==
Politics of Tunisia

- Form of government: unitary presidential representative democratic republic
- Capital of Tunisia: Tunis
- Elections in Tunisia
- 2010–2011 Tunisian uprising

=== Branches of the government of Tunisia ===
Outline of Tunisia
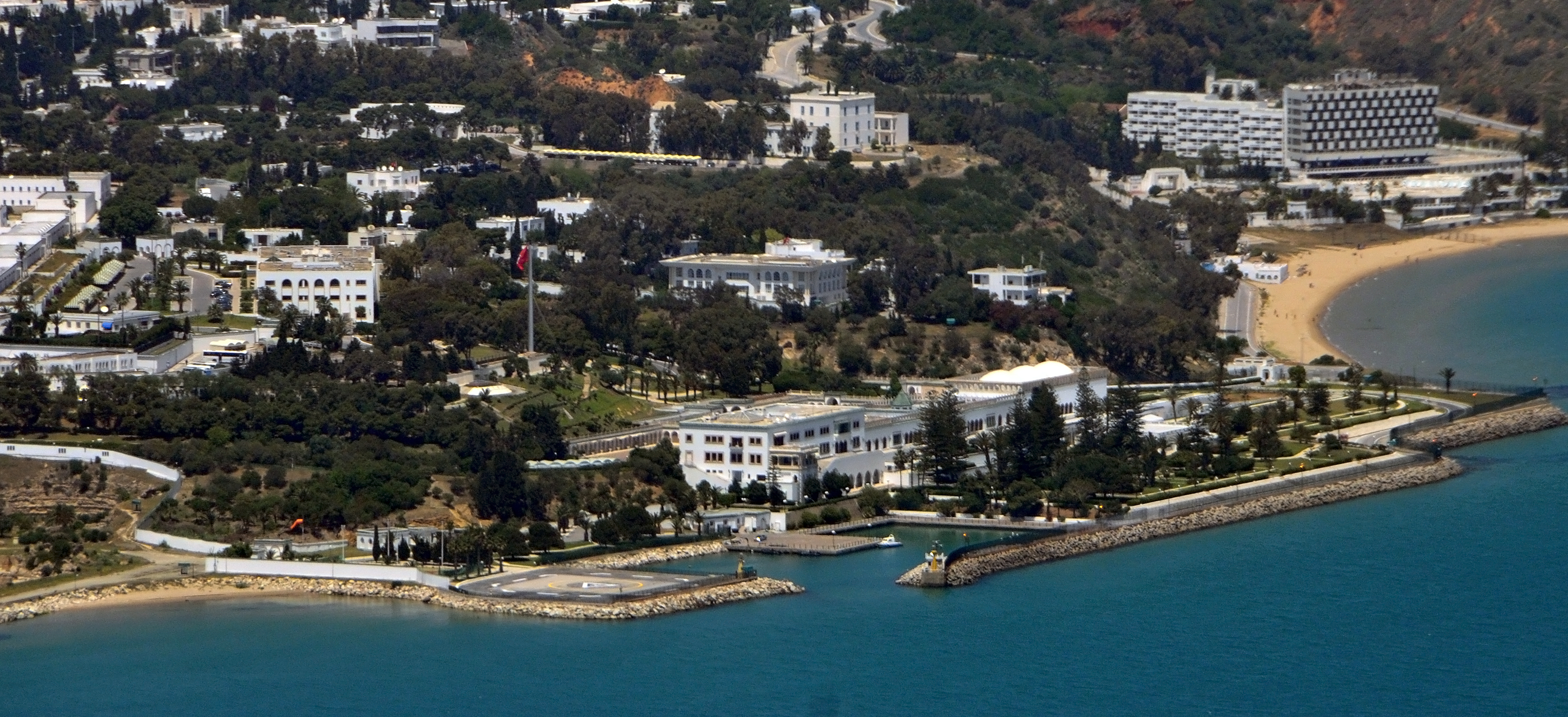
- Carthage Palace

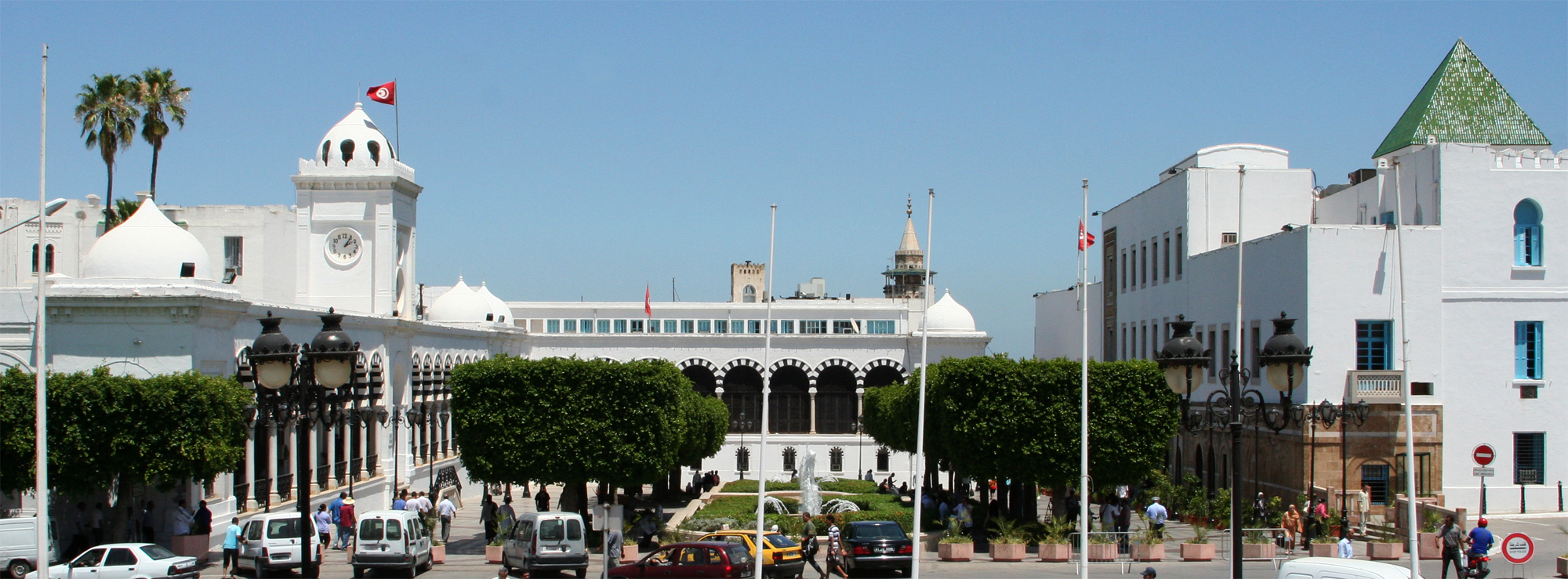
Dar El Bey

Government of Tunisia

==== Executive branch of the government of Tunisia ====
- Head of state: President of Tunisia, Kais Saied
- Head of government: Prime Minister of Tunisia, Sara Zaafarani
- Cabinet of Tunisia

==== Legislative branch of the government of Tunisia ====
- Upper House: National Council of Regions and Districts
- Lower House: Assembly of the Representatives of the People

==== Judicial branch of the government of Tunisia ====
Court system of Tunisia

- Court of Cassation – highest court of Tunisia.

=== Foreign relations of Tunisia ===
Foreign relations of Tunisia

- Diplomatic missions in Tunisia
- Diplomatic missions of Tunisia
- Tunisia Monitoring Group
- Tunisia – United States relations

==== International organization membership ====
The Tunisian Republic is a member of:

- African Development Bank Group (AfDB)
- African Union (AU)
- Arab Bank for Economic Development in Africa (ABEDA)
- Arab Fund for Economic and Social Development (AFESD)
- Arab Maghreb Union (AMU)
- Arab Monetary Fund (AMF)
- Black Sea Economic Cooperation Zone (BSEC) (observer)
- European Bank for Reconstruction and Development (EBRD)
- Food and Agriculture Organization (FAO)
- Group of 77 (G77)
- International Atomic Energy Agency (IAEA)
- International Bank for Reconstruction and Development (IBRD)
- International Chamber of Commerce (ICC)
- International Civil Aviation Organization (ICAO)
- International Criminal Police Organization (Interpol)
- International Development Association (IDA)
- International Federation of Red Cross and Red Crescent Societies (IFRCS)
- International Finance Corporation (IFC)
- International Fund for Agricultural Development (IFAD)
- International Hydrographic Organization (IHO)
- International Labour Organization (ILO)
- International Maritime Organization (IMO)
- International Mobile Satellite Organization (IMSO)
- International Monetary Fund (IMF)
- International Olympic Committee (IOC)
- International Organization for Migration (IOM)
- International Organization for Standardization (ISO)
- International Red Cross and Red Crescent Movement (ICRM)
- International Telecommunication Union (ITU)
- International Telecommunications Satellite Organization (ITSO)
- International Trade Union Confederation (ITUC)
- Inter-Parliamentary Union (IPU)
- Islamic Development Bank (IDB)
- League of Arab States (LAS)
- Multilateral Investment Guarantee Agency (MIGA)
- Nonaligned Movement (NAM)
- Organisation internationale de la Francophonie (OIF)
- Organisation of Islamic Cooperation (OIC)
- Organization for Security and Cooperation in Europe (OSCE) (partner)
- Organisation for the Prohibition of Chemical Weapons (OPCW)
- Organization of American States (OAS) (observer)
- Organization of Arab Petroleum Exporting Countries (OAPEC) (suspended)
- United Nations (UN)
- United Nations Conference on Trade and Development (UNCTAD)
- United Nations Educational, Scientific, and Cultural Organization (UNESCO)
- United Nations High Commissioner for Refugees (UNHCR)
- United Nations Industrial Development Organization (UNIDO)
- United Nations Operation in Cote d'Ivoire (UNOCI)
- United Nations Organization Mission in the Democratic Republic of the Congo (MONUC)
- Universal Postal Union (UPU)
- World Customs Organization (WCO)
- World Federation of Trade Unions (WFTU)
- World Health Organization (WHO)
- World Intellectual Property Organization (WIPO)
- World Meteorological Organization (WMO)
- World Tourism Organization (UNWTO)
- World Trade Organization (WTO)

=== Law and order in Tunisia ===
Law of Tunisia

- Constitution of Tunisia
- Crime in Tunisia
  - Polygamy in Tunisia
  - Prostitution in Tunisia
- Human rights in Tunisia
  - Code of Personal Status
  - Right to a healthy environment in Tunisia
  - LGBT rights in Tunisia
  - Freedom of speech in Tunisia
    - Censorship in Tunisia
      - Internet censorship in Tunisia
    - Tunisia Monitoring Group
- Law enforcement in Tunisia
  - Tunisian National Guard
- Tunisian passports
  - Visa requirements for Tunisian citizens
- Speed limits in Tunisia

=== Military of Tunisia ===
Military of Tunisia

- Command
  - Commander-in-chief:
    - Ministry of Defence of Tunisia
- Forces
  - Army of Tunisia
  - Navy of Tunisia
  - Air Force of Tunisia
  - Special Forces Group (G.F.C)
- Military history of Tunisia

=== Political parties in Tunisia ===
List of political parties in Tunisia

- Congress for the Republic
- Constitutional Democratic Rally
- Democratic Forum for Labour and Liberties
- Democratic Modernist Pole
- Destour
- Ennahda Movement
- Movement of Socialist Democrats
- Neo Destour
- Party of People's Unity
- Popular Petition
- Progressive Democratic Party
- Social Liberal Party
- Socialist Destourian Party
- Tunisian Communist Party
- Tunisian Workers' Communist Party
- Unionist Democratic Union

=== Politicians of Tunisia ===
- List of presidents of Tunisia
  - Habib Bourguiba
  - Zine El Abidine Ben Ali
- Prime Minister of Tunisia
  - Hédi Baccouche
  - Zine El Abidine Ben Ali
  - Mohamed Ghannouchi
  - Hamed Karoui
  - Mohammed Mzali
  - Hedi Amara Nouira
  - Rachid Sfar

== History of Tunisia ==
History of Tunisia

- History of North Africa

=== By period ===
  - History of early Tunisia
  - History of Carthage
    - Carthage
      - Carthago delenda est
  - History of Roman-era Tunisia / Africa (Roman province)
    - Diocese of Africa
- History of early Islamic Tunisia
- History of medieval Tunisia
  - Ifriqiya
- Ottoman Tunisia
  - Barbary pirates
    - Barbary slave trade
- History of French-era Tunisia
  - French conquest of Tunisia
    - Treaty of Bardo (1881)
  - French protectorate of Tunisia
    - Tunisia during World War II
      - Tunisia Campaign
- History of modern Tunisia
  - Arab Islamic Republic – proposed Libya-Tunisia union, 1974
  - Tunisian Revolution
  - 2013–14 Tunisian protests

=== By subject ===
==== Dynasties of Tunisia ====
- Aghlabids
- Fatimid Caliphate
- Zirid Dynasty
- Almohad Caliphate
- Hafsid dynasty
- Husainid Dynasty
  - List of Beys of Tunis

==== Economic history of Tunisia ====
- Second Tunisia Plan
- Third Tunisia Plan
- Fourth Tunisia Plan
- Fifth Tunisia Plan
- Sixth Tunisia Plan
- Seventh Tunisia Plan
- Ninth Tunisia Plan

==== Military history of Tunisia ====
- Battle of Adys (255 BC)
- Battle of Tunis (255 BC)
- Battle of the Great Plains (203 BC)
- Battle of Zama (202 BC)
- Battle of Carthage (c. 149 BC)
- Battle of Ruspina (46 BC)
- Battle of Thapsus (46 BC)
- Battle of Carthage (238)
- Vandalic War (533–534)
  - Battle of Ad Decimum (533)
  - Battle of Tricamarum (533)
- Battle of Carthage (698)
- Mahdia campaign (1087)
- Conquest of Tunis (1535)
- Battle of Djerba (1560)
- Barbary Wars
  - First Barbary War (1801–1805)
  - Second Barbary War (1815)
- Battle of Cape Bon (1941)
- Tunisia Campaign (1942–1943)
- Tunisian independence (1952–1956)
- Operation Wooden Leg (1985)

== Culture of Tunisia ==
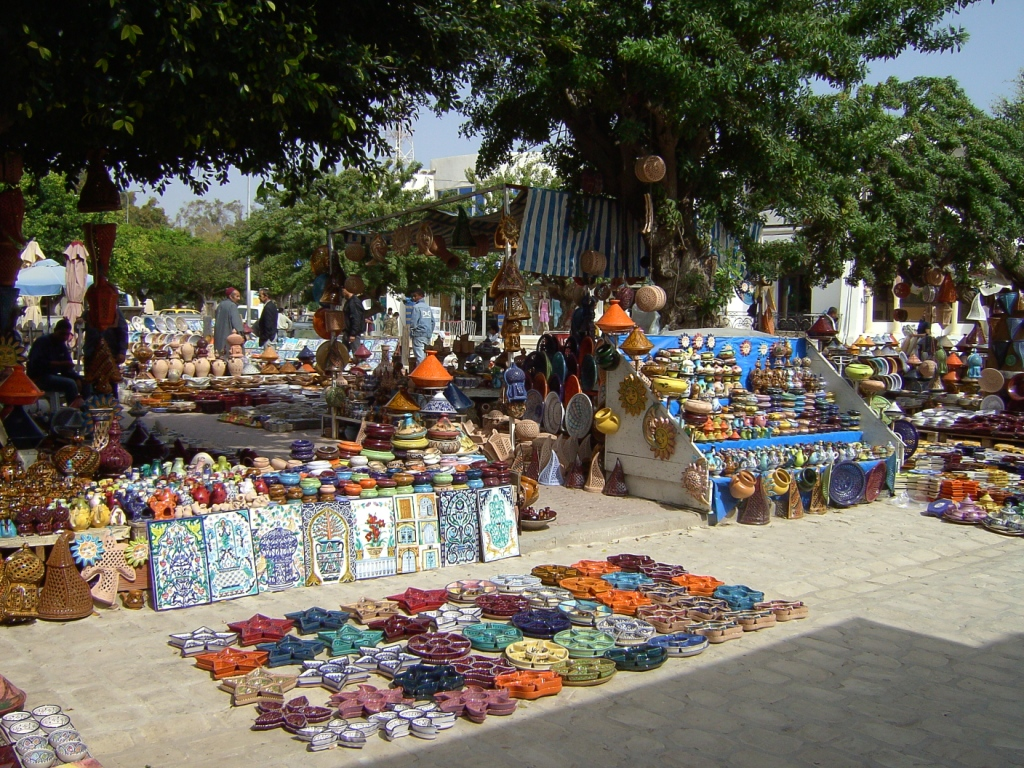
Pottery in Houmt Souk, Djerba

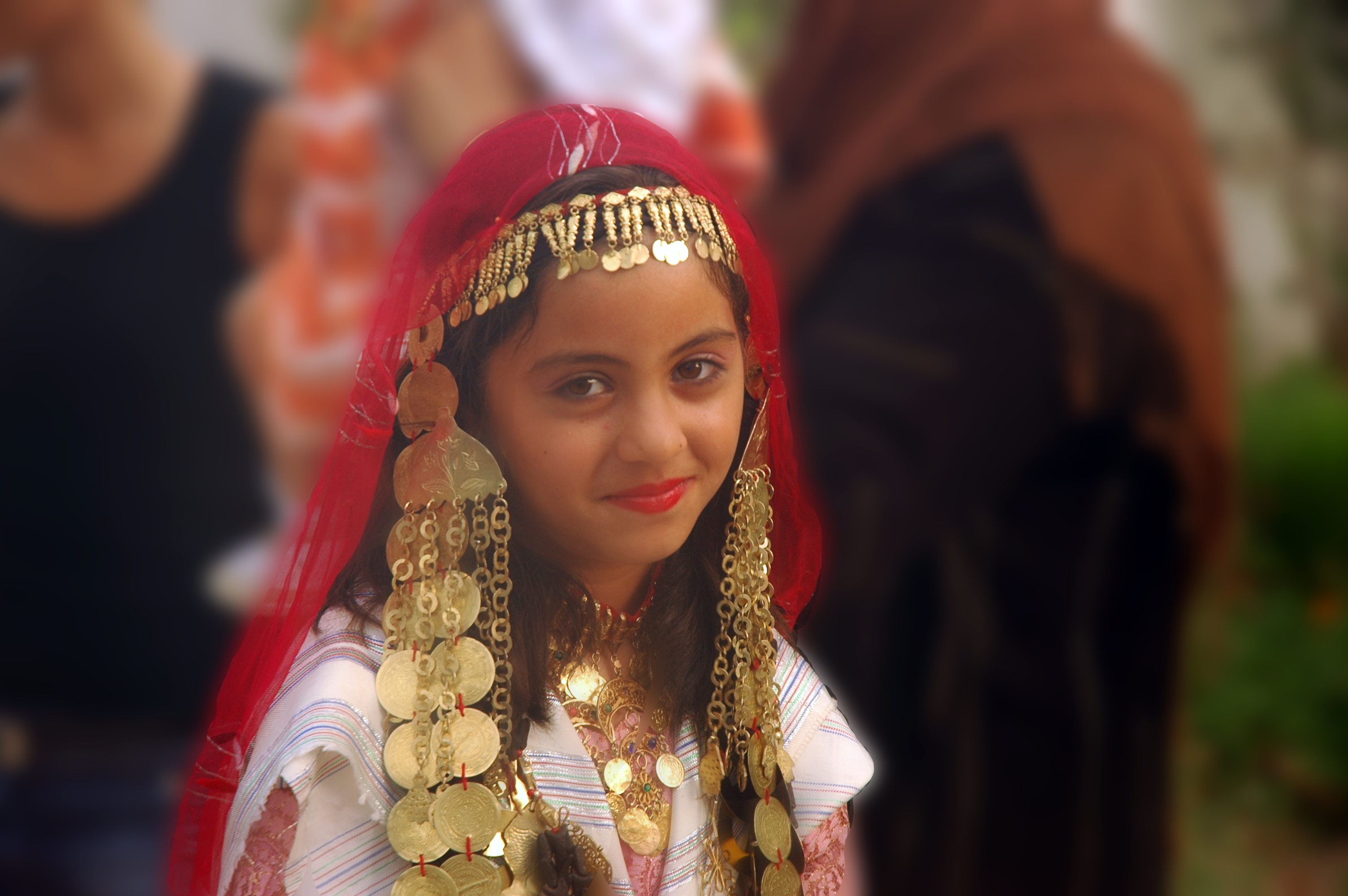
A young woman at a wedding in Djerba

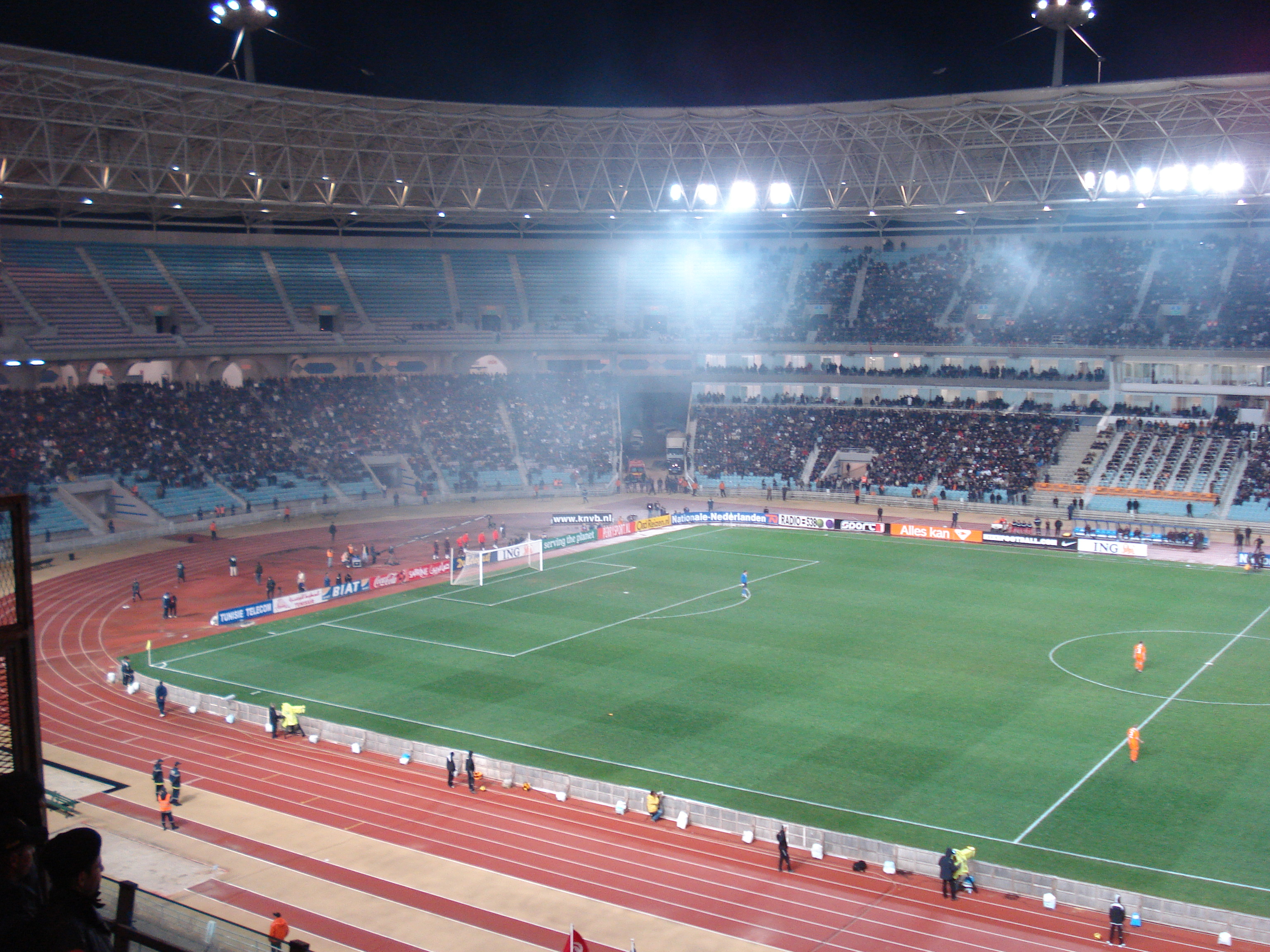
Stade Hammadi Agrebi

A man teaching Tunisian dance to children

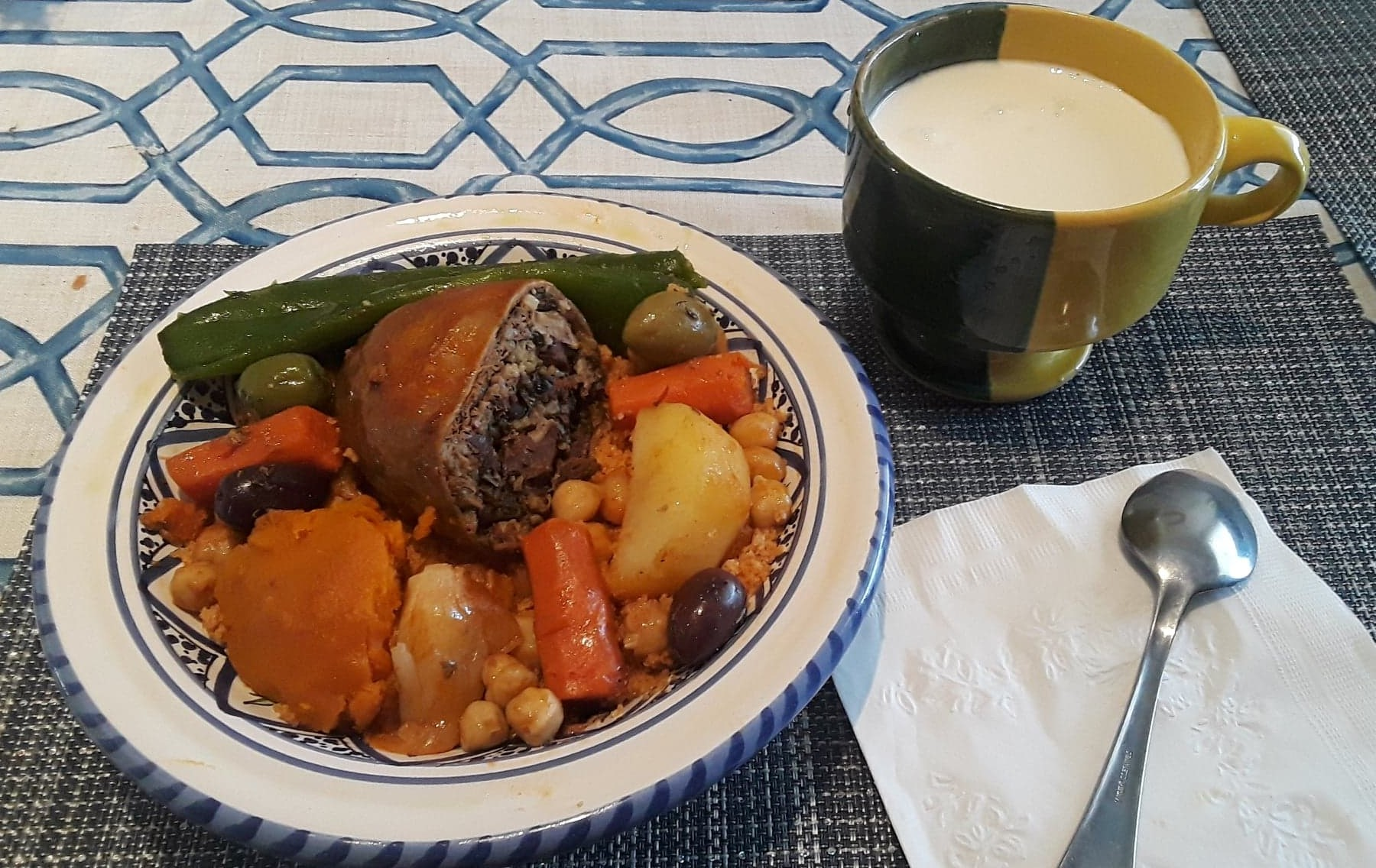
Tunisian couscous

Culture of Tunisia

- Languages of Tunisia
  - Northern Berber languages
  - Sened language (extinct)
  - Shilha language
  - Tunisian Arabic
- Museums in Tunisia
- National symbols of Tunisia
  - Coat of arms of Tunisia
  - Flag of Tunisia
  - National anthem of Tunisia (Humat al-Hima)
  - Nichan Iftikhar (order)
- People of Tunisia
  - Italian Tunisians
- Prostitution in Tunisia
- Public holidays in Tunisia
- Caving in Tunisia
- World Heritage Sites in Tunisia

=== Arts in Tunisia ===
- Art in Tunisia
  - Tunisian collaborative painting
- Cinema of Tunisia
- List of Tunisian films
- Literature of Tunisia
- Music of Tunisia
  - Checkpoint 303
  - Mezwed
  - Tunisia in the Eurovision Song Contest
  - Tunisian underground music
- Television in Tunisia
- Theatre in Tunisia
  - National Theatre of Tunisia

=== Cuisine of Tunisia ===
Cuisine of Tunisia

- Brik
- Chermoula
- Couscous
- Harissa
- Lablabi
- Makroudh
- Merguez
- Shakshouka
- Zlebia

=== Religion in Tunisia ===
Religion in Tunisia

- Christianity in Tunisia
  - Roman Catholicism in Tunisia
- Hinduism in Tunisia
- Islam in Tunisia
- Judaism in Tunisia

=== Sports in Tunisia ===
Sports in Tunisia

- List of Tunisian records in athletics
- Tunis Sports City
- Basketball in Tunisia
  - Tunisia national basketball team
  - Tunisia women's national basketball team
- Football in Tunisia
  - Tunisian Football Federation
  - Tunisian Coupe de la Ligue Professionnelle
  - Tunisian Ligue Professionnelle 1
  - Tunisian Ligue Professionnelle 2
  - Tunisian Ligue Professionnelle 3
  - Tunisia national football team
  - Tunisia women's national football team
  - Tunisian President Cup
- Tunisia national futsal team
- Handball in Tunisia
  - Tunisia men's national handball team
  - Tunisia women's national handball team
- Tunisia at the Mediterranean Games
  - Tunisia at the 2005 Mediterranean Games
  - Tunisia at the 2009 Mediterranean Games
- Tunisia at the Olympics
  - Tunisia at the 1960 Summer Olympics
  - Tunisia at the 1964 Summer Olympics
  - Tunisia at the 1968 Summer Olympics
  - Tunisia at the 1972 Summer Olympics
  - Tunisia at the 1976 Summer Olympics
  - Tunisia at the 1984 Summer Olympics
  - Tunisia at the 1988 Summer Olympics
  - Tunisia at the 1992 Summer Olympics
  - Tunisia at the 1996 Summer Olympics
  - Tunisia at the 2000 Summer Olympics
  - Tunisia at the 2004 Summer Olympics
  - Tunisia at the 2008 Summer Olympics
- Tunisia at the Paralympics
  - Tunisia at the 2004 Summer Paralympics
  - Tunisia at the 2008 Summer Paralympics
- Tunisia at the 2009 World Championships in Athletics
- Tunisia at the 2010 Summer Youth Olympics
- Rugby union in Tunisia
  - Tunisia national rugby union team
  - Tunisia national rugby sevens team
  - Tunisian Rugby Federation
- Tunisia men's national volleyball team
- Tunisia men's national water polo team
- Tennis in Tunisia
  - Tunis Open
  - Tunisia Davis Cup team
  - Tunisia Fed Cup team

== Economy and infrastructure of Tunisia ==
Economy of Tunisia

- Economic rank, by nominal GDP (2007): 77th (seventy-seventh)
- Banking in Tunisia
  - Central Bank of Tunisia
  - List of banks in Tunisia
- Communications in Tunisia
  - Internet in Tunisia
    - Internet censorship in Tunisia
    - Tunisian Internet Agency
  - Telephone numbers in Tunisia
- Companies of Tunisia
  - Entreprise Tunisienne d'Activités Pétrolières (state-owned)
    - Numhyd
  - Tunisian Railways
  - Tunisiana (owned by Orascom Telecom Holding)
- Currency of Tunisia: Dinar
  - Tunisian duro
  - ISO 4217: TND
- Economic history of Tunisia
- Energy in Tunisia
- Health care in Tunisia
- Mining in Tunisia
- Stock exchange: Bourse de Tunis
- Tourism in Tunisia
- Trade unions in Tunisia
  - Confédération Générale des Travailleurs Tunisiens
  - Tunisian General Labour Union
  - Union Syndicale des Travailleurs de Tunisie
  - Union des Travailleurs Tunisiens
  - Transport in Tunisia
  - Air transport in Tunisia
    - Airlines in Tunisia
      - Karthago Airlines
      - Nouvelair
      - Sevenair
      - SBA Airlines (planned)
      - Tunisair
    - Airports in Tunisia
      - Borj El Amri Airport
      - Djerba–Zarzis International Airport
      - Monastir – Habib Bourguiba International Airport
      - Tozeur–Nefta International Airport
      - Sfax–Thyna International Airport
      - Tunis–Carthage International Airport
      - Enfidha – Hammamet International Airport
  - Rail transport in Tunisia
    - Railway stations in Tunisia
    - List of Tunis Metro stations
    - Métro léger de Tunis
    - Société des transports de Tunis
    - TGM
  - Roads in Tunisia
    - Speed limits in Tunisia
- Water supply and sanitation in Tunisia

== Education in Tunisia ==
Education in Tunisia

- List of schools in Tunisia
- List of universities in Tunisia

== See also ==
Tunisia

- List of international rankings
- Member state of the United Nations
- Outline of Africa
- Outline of geography
