= Second Tunisia Plan =

The Second Tunisia Plan was an economic development plan implemented by the government of President Habib Bourguiba from 1965 to 1968.

The government invested about as much in agriculture as in industry.

== See also ==
- Economy of Tunisia
- First Tunisia Plan
- Third Tunisia Plan
- Fourth Tunisia Plan
- Fifth Tunisia Plan
- Sixth Tunisia Plan
- Seventh Tunisia Plan
- Eighth Tunisia Plan
- Ninth Tunisia Plan
