= Fifth Tunisia Plan =

The Fifth Tunisia Plan was an economic development plan implemented by the government of Tunisia from 1977 to 1981.

The government allocated 47% of its investment to capital-intensive projects.

== See also ==
- Economy of Tunisia
- Third Tunisia Plan
- Fourth Tunisia Plan
- Sixth Tunisia Plan
- Seventh Tunisia Plan
- Ninth Tunisia Plan
