= Seventh Tunisia Plan =

The Seventh Tunisia Plan was an economic development plan implemented by the government of Tunisia from 1986 to 1990.

== See also ==
- Economy of Tunisia
- Third Tunisia Plan
- Fourth Tunisia Plan
- Sixth Tunisia Plan
- Ninth Tunisia Plan
