= Sixth Tunisia Plan =

The Sixth Tunisia Plan was an economic development plan implemented by the government of President Habib Bourguiba from 1982 to 1986.

Critics derided the plan's failure to lower the unemployment rate, attributing the lack of available work to the global recession, excessive focus on capital investment programs, and the government's foreign debt.

== See also ==
- Economy of Tunisia
- Third Tunisia Plan
- Fourth Tunisia Plan
- Ninth Tunisia Plan
