= Climate of Tunisia =

Tunisia

Climate chart (precipitation, max. and min. temperature)
J	F	M	A	M	J	J	A	S	O	N	D
2 59 44	1.8 60 44	1.7 64 47	1.4 69 51	0.8 76 57	0.4 84 64	0.1 90 68	0.4 90 70	1.3 85 66	2.2 76 60	1.8 67 51	2.2 61 46
- █ Average max. and min. temperatures in °F
- █ Precipitation totals in inches
Metric conversion
J	F	M	A	M	J	J	A	S	O	N	D
51 15 6	46 16 7	43 18 8	36 20 11	20 25 14	10 29 18	2.5 32 20	10 32 21	33 29 19	56 25 15	46 20 11	56 16 8
- █ Average max. and min. temperatures in °C
- █ Precipitation totals in mm

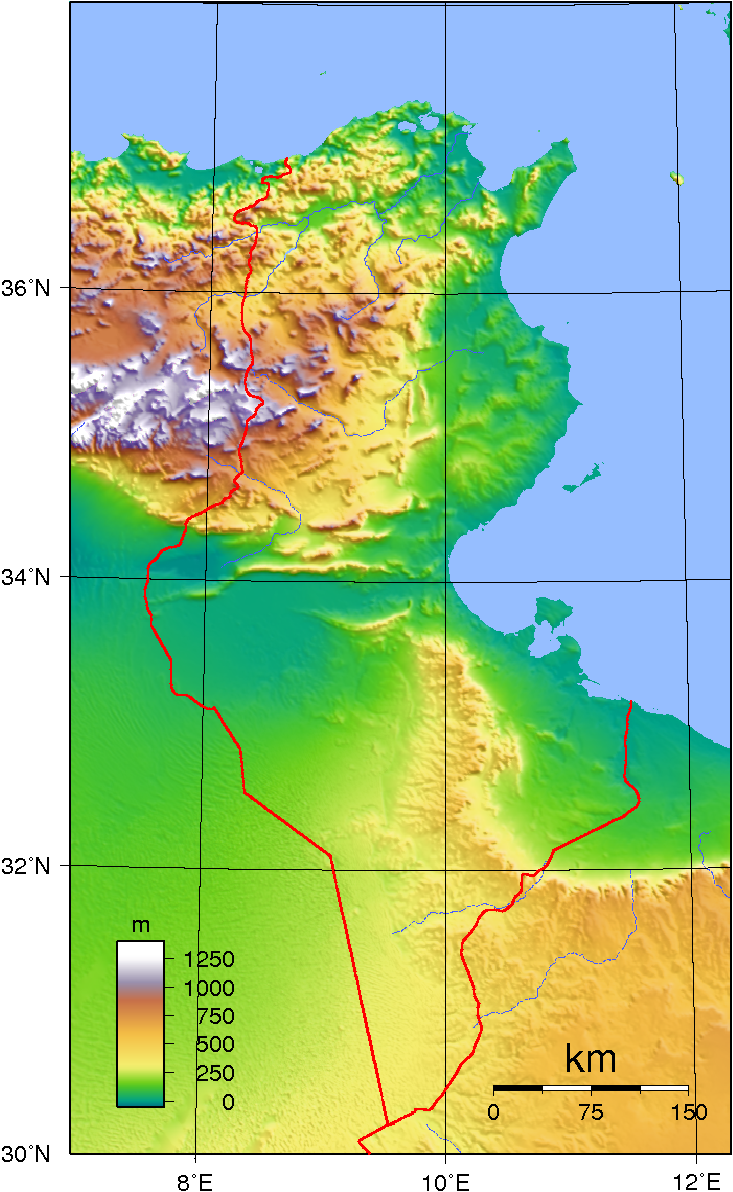
A topographic map of Tunisia

The climate of Tunisia is Mediterranean in the north, with mild rainy winters and hot, dry summers. The south of the country is desert. The terrain in the north is mountainous, which, moving south, gives way to a hot, dry central plain. The south is semiarid, and merges into the Sahara. A series of salt lakes, known as chotts or shatts, lie in an east–west line at the northern edge of the Sahara, extending from the Gulf of Gabes into Algeria. The lowest point of the Tunisian landscape is located at Chott el Djerid, which stands at 17 metres (56 ft) below sea level and the highest point is Jebel ech Chambi, at 1,544 metres (5,066 ft) above sea level.

== Geography ==
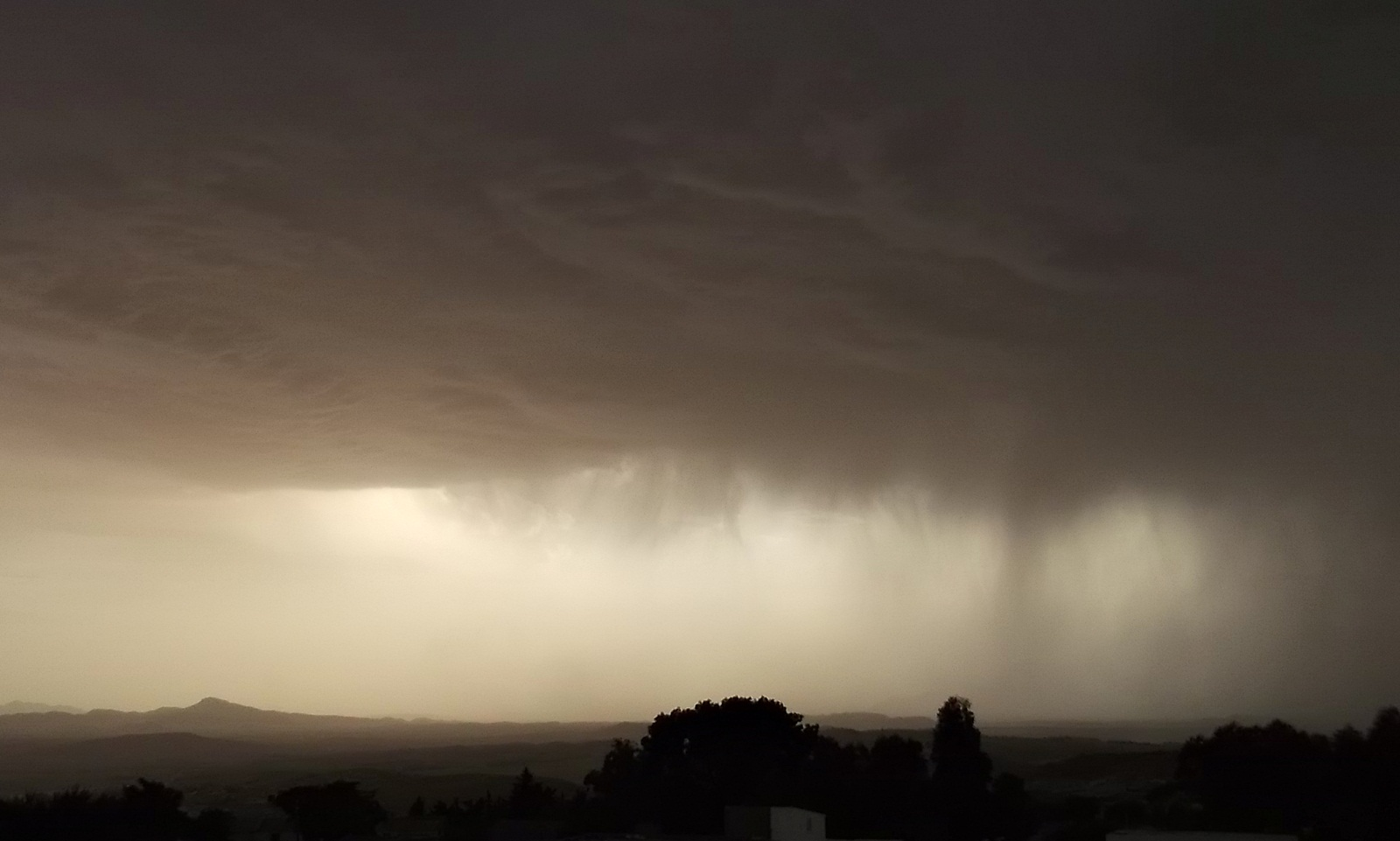
A sandstorm in the city of Kef in the North West region on April 23, 2014

Tunisia's climate is affected by various types of wind due to its geographical location: the northern coast is exposed to moderate and humid sea winds blowing from southern France, resulting in a significant decrease in temperatures and an increase in rainfall. In the south of the country, there are hot and dry continental winds, such as the Chergui wind, which blows over large desert areas causing a sudden rise in temperatures and a clear dry atmosphere. The country also benefits from a high amount of sunshine, exceeding 3000 hours per year, which reaches its peak in the southern desert, on the Algerian and Libyan borders.

Temperatures vary according to latitude, longitude, and proximity to the Mediterranean Sea. While temperatures can drop below 0 degrees Celsius in the winter in the Khemer Mountains (Kroumirie), the maximum temperature often rises to around 45 degrees Celsius in the desert regions in the summer. Average annual rainfall also varies by region, from about 1000 mm in the north to about 380 mm in the center and down to less than 50 mm in the far south.

The country has an area of approximately 16,361,000 hectares, with 9,700,500 hectares of agricultural land and 701,200 hectares of forested land.

== Regions ==
Tunisia is the eighteenth most water stressed country in the world.

Tunisia's climate is divided into seven bioclimatic zones, with the main difference between the north and the rest of the country being due to the Tunisian hills which separate the regions subject to a Mediterranean climate and a typical hot desert climate of the Sahara - the largest hot desert in the world. Between them, there is a semi-arid climate with common characteristics between the two main climatic systems in the country.

On average, the temperatures in Tunisia are very high, averaging 18 degrees Celsius throughout the year. There is an all time high of 54°C in El Borma in the southern desert in August and an all time low of -15°C in Thala (north) during February. Tunisia lies within a desert and is quite hot. During the summer months of August and June, the heat lingers around an average temperature of 94 °F (34 °C)

== Climate change ==
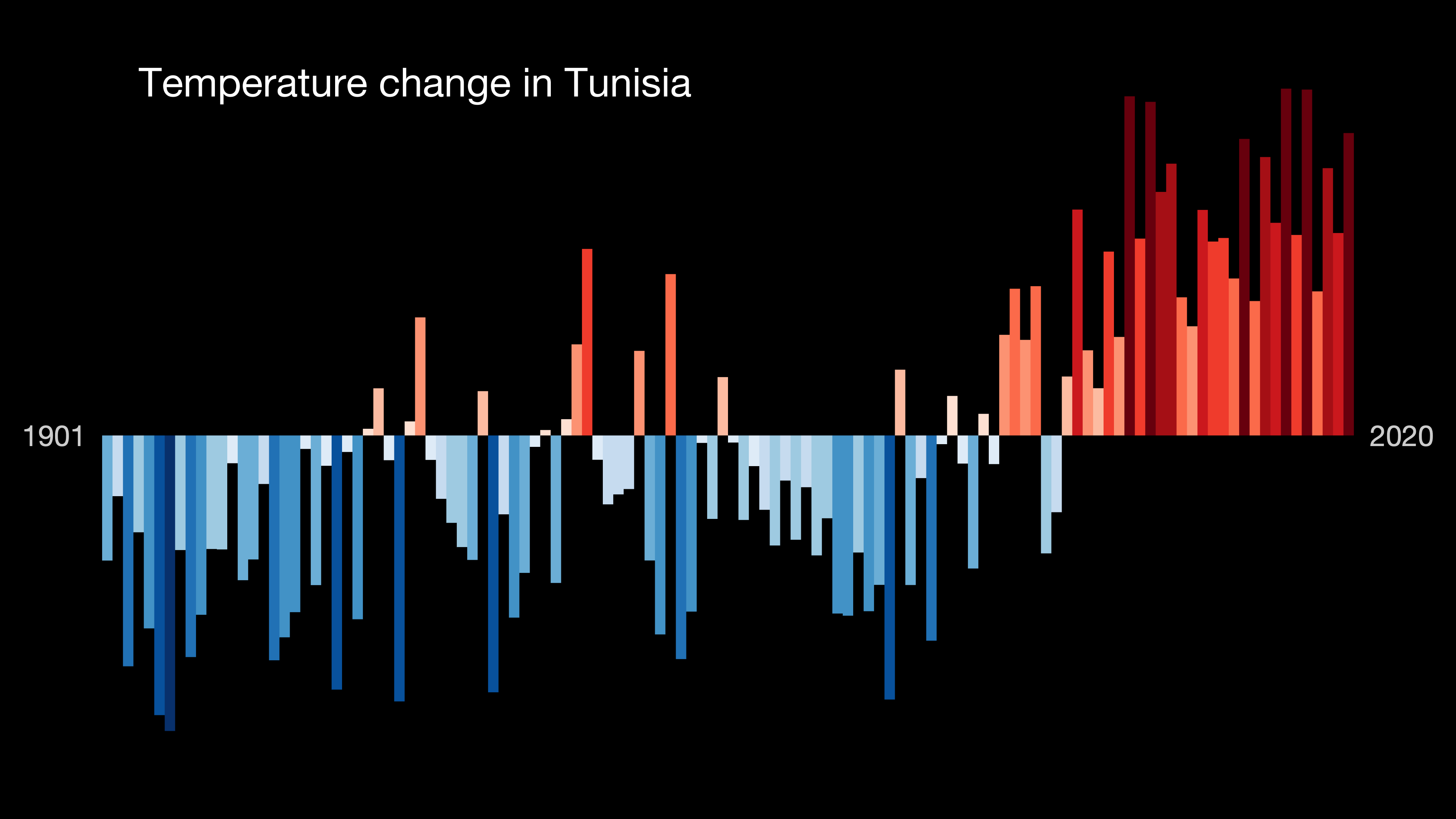
Bar Chart of temperature change in Tunisia from 1901 to 2020

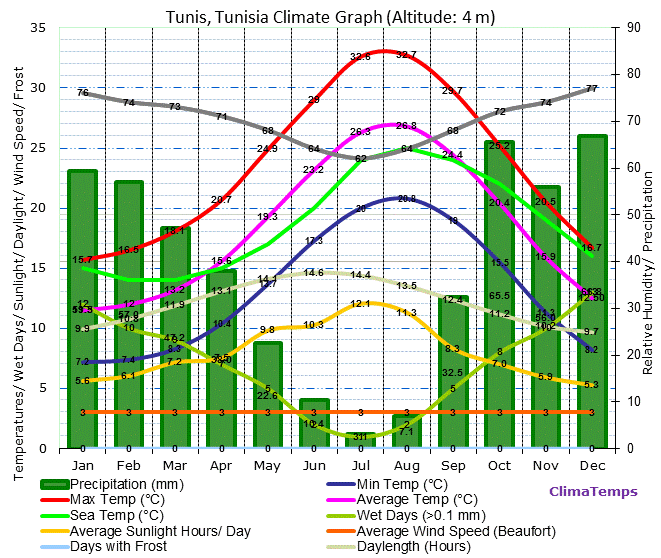
http://www.tunis.climatemps.com/graph.php

Tunisia has experienced a significant increase in temperatures over the 20th and early 21st centuries, with the average temperature rising by approximately 1.2 °C from 1901 to 2020. This trend of rising temperatures is expected to continue, leading to numerous impacts on the country's ecosystems, agriculture, and human health. The Mediterranean is one of the regions of the world most affected by the effects of climate change. Mediterranean temperatures are increasing 20% faster than the global average. The country faces high vulnerability to climate change, anticipating adverse impacts from heightened temperatures, increased aridity, reduced precipitation, and rising sea levels. These changes are expected to significantly affect water resources, agriculture, ecosystems, coastal areas, health, and the tourism sector.

The limited water resources available in Tunisia means that the country is very susceptible to small changes in ambient temperature that result in the even further reduced water availability. This makes the agricultural activities more vulnerable to the effects of climate change. As a result of stressors such as rising temperatures, sea level rise, and change in precipitation patterns, potential risks to agriculture in Tunisia include decrease in crop yields, shifts in growing seasons, degradation of soil quality and productivity, increased salinization of aquifers and decreased availability of water for irrigation. These changes are likely to affect an increase in food prices and food shortages as well as economic losses, both national and household incomes.

Climate change affects cities more as the ventures in the urban areas are massive contributors to climate change. According to the UN Habitat, 2021, city areas account for about 70% of CO_{2} emissions. Urban population in Tunisia is increasing. Currently, 69% of the population in Tunisia lives in cities, and this population is expected to reach 80% by 2050. The climate in Tunisia in the north reflect the precipitation and temperature patterns of Mediterranean climate. The climate becomes hotter and drier further moving to the South. The graph shows climactic averages in Tunisia throughout the year, and includes days with frost, daytime length, wet days, average wind speeds, sea temperature, max temperature, and average summertime day length.

== Socio-economic impacts and the environment ==
Tunisia, which has been classified as a lower-middle income country according to the World Bank group, has made significant strides in political transformation toward democratic systems and more transparent governance structures. This includes a restructuring of established political norms and policy. However, its economic growth has not advanced at a similar pace. The nation grapples with political fragmentation and a lack of consensus on crucial economic reforms. Moreover, the ongoing conflict in neighboring Libya has compounded economic challenges, contributing to social discontent and soaring unemployment, particularly among the youth. Since the Tunisian revolution of 2011, the Ministry of Local Affairs and Environment, the responsible entity at the national level, and municipalities have been engaged in an ongoing process to increase decentralized decision making and involvement at the local level. Such practices are critical for climate change adaptation at the urban level.

The coastal regions of Tunisia have a Mediterranean climate, which allows the production and cultivation of fruits, like grapes and vineyards, and olives. However, the country of Tunisia is large and also has zones of desert where farming techniques have adapted to flourish among low rainfall and extreme heat. Because of Tunisia’s diverse climate and seaside attractions, tourism has been an important source of revenue for the country. However, seaside tourism and urban sprawl along the coasts have had negatively affected coastal landscapes and natural resources.

== See also ==
- Geography of Tunisia
