= International rankings of Tunisia =

The following are international rankings of Tunisia.

== Demographics ==
- United Nations: Population, ranked 79 out of 223 countries
- CIA World Factbook: Urbanization ranked 67 out of 193 countries

== Economy ==
- The Wall Street Journal and The Heritage Foundation: Index of Economic Freedom 2009, ranked X out of 179 countries
- World Bank: Ease of Doing Business Index 2009, ranked 69 out of 181 countries
- International Monetary Fund: GDP per capita 2008, ranked 96 out of 179 countries
- World Bank: GDP per capita 2008, ranked 89 out of 170 countries
- CIA World Factbook: GDP per capita 2008, ranked 103 out of 192 countries
- World Intellectual Property Organization: Global Innovation Index 2026, ranked 71 out of 139 countries

== Education ==
- United Nations gross enrolment ratio 2005, ranked X out of 177 countries
- United Nations Development Programme: literacy rate 2007/2008, ranked 128 out of 177 countries

== Geography ==
- Total area ranked X out of 233 countries and outlying territories
- Renewable water resources ranked X out of 174 countries

== Military ==
- CIA World Factbook: Military expenditures ranked X out of 171 countries
- CIA World Factbook: Military expenditures ratio to GDP, ranked X out of 174 countries

== Politics ==
- Transparency International: Corruption Perceptions Index 2007, ranked 61 out of 179 countries
- Reporters Without Borders: World Press Freedom Index 2008, ranked X out of 173 countries
- The Economist EIU: Democracy Index 2008, ranked X out of 167 countries

== Transportation ==
- Motor vehicles per capita ranked 68 out of 140 countries

== International rankings ==
Organization	Survey	Ranking
Institute for Economics and Peace	Global Peace Index	44 out of 144
United Nations Development Programme	Human Development Index	98 out of 182
Transparency International	Corruption Perceptions Index	65 out of 180
World Economic Forum	Global Competitiveness Report	40 out of 133
