= Union syndicale des travailleurs de Tunisie =

Union syndicale des travailleurs de Tunisie (abbreviated USTT) was a central trade union organisation in Tunisia. Founded in 1946, as the Tunisian branch of the French trade union confederation CGT separated itself from the mother organization. Hassen Saadaoui was the chairman of USTT.

In September 1956 USTT dissolved itself, and called upon its members to join the UGTT.
