= Speed limits in Tunisia =

The general speed limits in Tunisia are:

- 50 km/h (31 mph) within urban areas.
- 70 km/h (43 mph) on four-lane expressways within urban areas.
- 90 km/h (56 mph) outside urban areas.
- 110 km/h (68 mph) on freeways.
