= Third Tunisia Plan =

The Third Tunisia Plan was an economic development plan implemented by the government of President Habib Bourguiba from 1969 to 1972.

The plan marks the first time Tunisia invested more in industry, 31.7% of the government's budget, than in agriculture, 14.8%.

== See also ==
- Economy of Tunisia
- Fourth Tunisia Plan
- Ninth Tunisia Plan
