= Fourth Tunisia Plan =

The Fourth Tunisia Plan was an economic development plan and realignment of foreign policy implemented by the government of President Habib Bourguiba from 1973 to 1976.

Bourguiba resolved lingering disputes with France and signed an association accord with the European Community (EC) in 1969 and a cooperation accord in 1976.

== See also ==
- Economy of Tunisia
- Ninth Tunisia Plan
- Eurabia
