= Ninth Tunisia Plan =

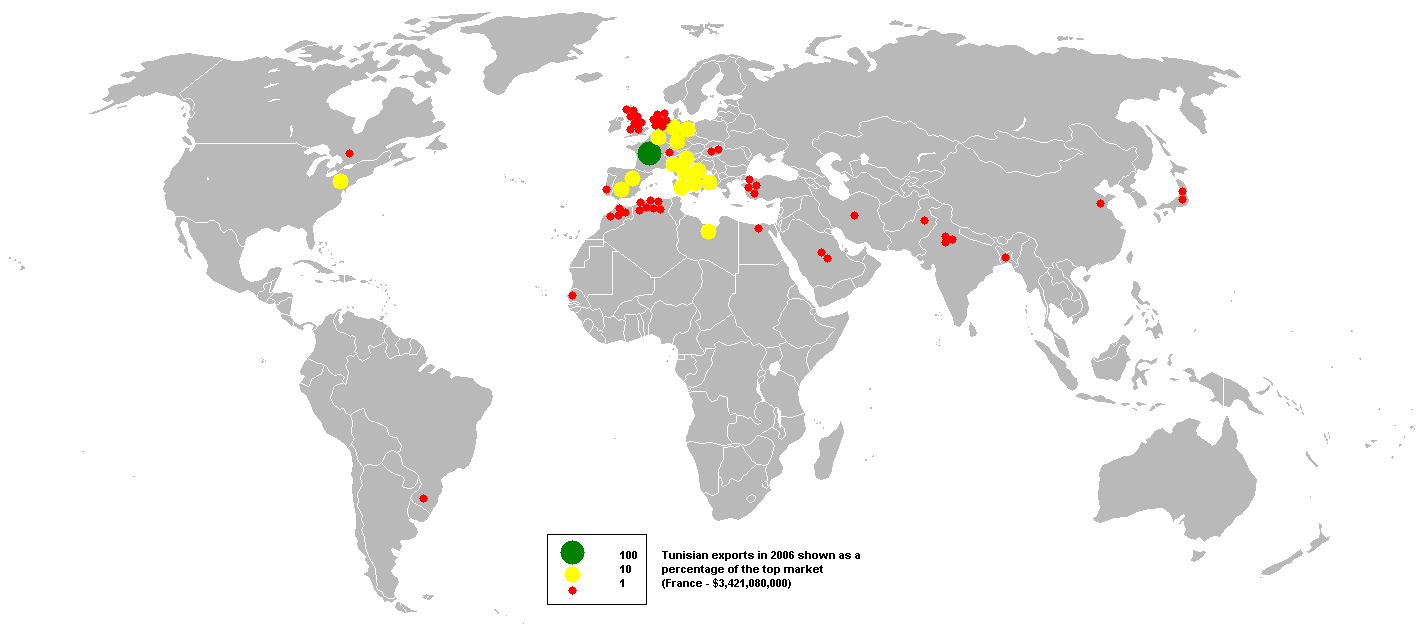
Tunisian exports in 2006

The Ninth Tunisia Plan was an economic development plan implemented by the government of Tunisia from 1996 to 2001.

President Ben Ali established the Ministry of International Cooperation and Investment in June 1992, appointing Mohammed Ghannouchi as Minister. The Tunisian government began negotiations with Belgium, culminating in a free-trade agreement in 1995. Tunisia began producing the Miskar natural gas field that same year in cooperation with Agip of Italy, British Gas plc, and Elf-Aquitane of France. In 1996, when the program began, 73% of Tunisia's foreign trade was with Europe, not Northern Africa.

== Results ==
Inflation lowered to 2.7% in 1999. In 1987, when Ben Ali seized power in a coup d'état, the unemployment rate rose to 12%. By 2001, the government had cut the unemployment rate in half. School attendance increased by 9%, from 90% in 1988 to 99% of the population in 2001. Life expectancy increased from sixty-seven years in 1988 to seventy-three years in 2000. On the other hand, external debt continues to plague Tunisia's economy. Tunisia owed $11 billion in 1999, spending between 45% and 50% of GDP and 20% of export earnings on debt alone. The Tunisian government spends more on debt than public education or health care.

== See also ==
- Economy of Tunisia
