= Economy of Tunisia =

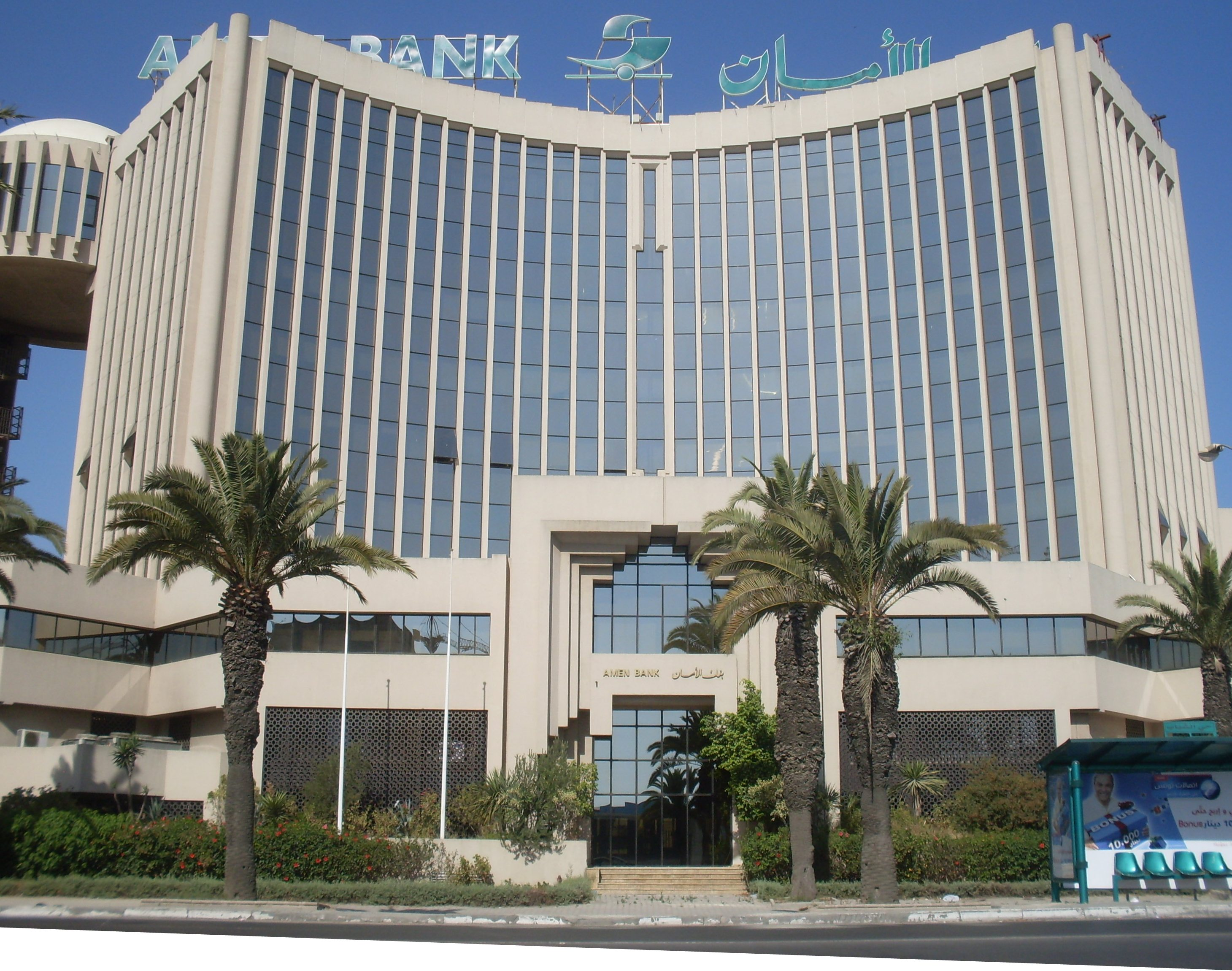
- Amen Bank, one of the biggest banks in the country
- Currency: Tunisian dinar (TND, د.ت)
- Fiscal year: Calendar year
- Trade organisations: African Union, AfCFTA (signed), WTO, COMESA, CEN-SAD, AMU
- Country group: Developing/Emerging; Lower-middle income economy

Statistics
- Population: ▲12,386,642 (2025)
- GDP: ▲$60.43 billion (nominal est, 2026); ▲$193.55 billion (PPP, 2026)
- GDP rank: 89st (nominal, 2026); 84st (PPP, 2026)
- GDP growth: ▲2.5% (2025); ▲2.1% (2026e); ▲1.6% (2027f)
- GDP per capita: ▲$4,826 (nominal, est, 2026); ▲$15,456 (PPP, 2026)
- GDP per capita rank: 123st (nominal, 2026); 112st (PPP, 2026)
- GDP by sector: agriculture: ▼10.05%; industry: ▼21.69%; services: ▲68.26%; (2020)
- Inflation (CPI): ▼5.2% (2025)
- Population below national poverty line: 15.2% (2015); 17.5% on less than $5.50/day (2015)
- Gini coefficient: 33.7 medium (2021)
- Human Development Index: ▲0.746 high (2023) (105th); ▲0.595 medium IHDI (2023)
- Labour force: ▲4,246,885 (2024); ▼36% employment rate (2024)
- Labour force by occupation: agriculture: 14.8%; industry: 33.2%; services: 51.7%; (2014 est.)
- Unemployment: ▼14.9% (2026, Q2)
- Youth unemployment: ▼38.0% (2026)
- Average net salary: $328 monthly (2026)
- Main industries: petroleum, mining (particularly phosphate, iron ore), tourism, textile, footwear, agriculture, beverages, olive oil

External
- Exports: ▼$23.3 billion USD (2024)
- Export goods: clothing, semi-finished goods and textiles, agricultural products, mechanical goods, phosphates and chemicals, hydrocarbons, electrical equipment
- Main export partners: EU 70.17%; France 23.2%; Italy 16.6%; Germany 13.4%; Spain 4.75%; Poland 1.76%; United States 4.69%; Libya 3.38%; United Kingdom 2.79%; Algeria 2.34%; China 1.80% (2024)
- Imports: ▲$26.4 billion USD (2024)
- Import goods: textiles, machinery and equipment, hydrocarbons, chemicals, foodstuffs
- Main import partners: EU 47.87%; France 12.6%; Italy 12.3%; Germany 7.77%; Spain 3.93%; Greece 1.66%; China 11.4%; Algeria 7.39%; Russia 6.65%; Turkey 4.59%; United States 2.38% (2024)
- FDI stock: ▲$37.95 billion (31 December 2017 est.); Abroad: $285 million (31 December 2017 est.)
- Current account: ▲ −$2.690 billion (2019)
- Gross external debt: ▲$30.19 billion (31 December 2017 est.)

Public finance
- Government debt: ▲70.3% of GDP (2017 est.)
- Foreign reserves: ▲$8.5 billion (23 December 2023 est.)
- Budget balance: −5.8% (of GDP) (2017 est.)
- Revenue: 10.957 billion (2022 est.)
- Spending: 12.523 billion (2022 est.)
- Credit rating: Standard & Poor's: BBB (Domestic); BBB- (Foreign); BBB (T&C Assessment); Outlook: Negative; Moody's: Baa3; Outlook: Negative; Fitch: BBB; Outlook: Negative
- All values, unless otherwise stated, are in US dollars.

Tunisia is considered a developing economy, classified as a Lower-middle Income country by the World Bank in 2023. In 2010, liberalisation efforts led to its graduation to the status of Upper-middle Income country, but backsliding and increasing terrorist attacks made it lose this status in 2015. Liberalisation efforts started in 1986 after three decades of dirigisme and state control of the economy. From 1 January 2008 onwards, the country opened up to international trade with the adoption of the free trade agreement with the European Union in 1995, a process which increased in scale after the 2011 Arab Spring and subsequent political reforms. Prudent economic and fiscal planning has resulted in moderate but sustained growth for over a decade.

Tunisia's economic growth has depended on oil, phosphates, agri-food products, car parts manufacturing, and tourism.

Compared to other countries in the Maghreb region (Algeria and Morocco), Tunisia placed second in GDP per capita and total development until 2022, but now places third.

In the 2007 World Economic Forum meeting on Africa (13 to 15 June 2007), Tunisia was recognised as the most competitive economy in Africa, and the 29th out of 128 at the global level (from 30th in 2006).

== Historical trend ==
GDP per capita soared by more than 380% in the seventies (1970–1980: USD 280–1,369). But this proved unsustainable and it collapsed to a cumulative 10% growth in the turbulent eighties (1980–1990: USD 1,369–1,507), rising again to almost 50% cumulative growth in the nineties (1990–2000: USD 1,507–2,245), signifying the impact of successful diversification.

Growing foreign debt and the foreign exchange crisis in the mid-1980s led the government to launch a structural adjustment program to liberalize prices, reduce tariffs, and reorient Tunisia toward a market economy in 1986. Tunisia's economic reform program was lauded as a model by international financial institutions. The government liberalized prices, reduced tariffs, lowered debt-service-to-exports and debt-to-GDP ratios, and extended the average maturity of its $10 billion foreign debt. Structural adjustment brought additional lending from the World Bank and other Western creditors. In 1990, Tunisia acceded to the General Agreement on Tariffs and Trade (GATT) and is a member of the World Trade Organization (WTO).

In 1996 Tunisia entered into an "Association Agreement" with the European Union (EU) which removed tariffs and other trade barriers on most goods by 2008. In conjunction with the Association Agreement, the EU is assisting the Tunisian government's Mise A Niveau (upgrading) program to enhance the productivity of Tunisian businesses and prepare for competition in the global marketplace.

The government totally or partially privatized around 160 state-owned enterprises after the privatization program was launched in 1987. Although the program is supported by the GATT, the government had to move carefully to avoid mass firings. Unemployment continued to plague Tunisia's economy and was aggravated by a rapidly growing workforce. An estimated 55% of the population is under the age of 25. Officially, 15.2% of the Tunisian workforce is unemployed.

In 2011, after the Arab Spring, the economy slumped but then recovered with 2.81% GDP growth in 2014. However, unemployment is still one of the major issues with 15.2% of the labor force unemployed as of the first quarter of 2014. Tunisia's political transition gained new momentum in early 2014, with the resolution of a political deadlock, the adoption of a new Constitution and the appointment of a new government. The national dialogue platform, brokered by key civil society organizations, played a crucial role in gathering all major political parties. This consensus will allow for further reform in the economy and public sector.

In 2015, the Bardo National Museum attack led to the collapse of the third largest sector of Tunisia's economy; tourism. Tunisian tourist workers in Tunis have said that "tourism is dead, it is completely dead", expressing the severe drop in tourism after the attack.

The number of ragpickers in Tunisia is increasing due to the continuing high level of unemployment, the loss of purchasing power of the most disadvantaged families, and the explosion of plastic waste due to new consumption habits. Ragpickers do not benefit from social protection, granted to professions with a legal status and may be subject to the exploitation of the Recycling industry.

In January 2023, Marouane Abassi, governor of the Central Bank of Tunisia, warned that without an agreement with the IMF, his country would not be able to withstand the surge in prices and would not be able to maintain its growth rates.

According to data from Tunisia's National Institute of Statistics, the country's economy expanded by 2.7% in 2025 and by 2.4% during the first half of 2026. In September 2026, the World Bank projected that economic growth for the full year would reach 2.3%.

The following table shows the main economic indicators in 1980–2026. Inflation under 5% is in green. Figures for 2026 are IMF projections.

| Year | GDP (in Bil. US$ PPP) | GDP per capita (in US$ PPP) | GDP (in bil. US$ nominal) | GDP growth (real) | Inflation rate (in Percent) | Unemployment (in Percent) | Government debt (in % of GDP) |
|---|---|---|---|---|---|---|---|
| 1980 | 13.3 | 2,045 | 9.6 | ▲7.4% | ▲10.0% | n/a | n/a |
| 1981 | ▲15.4 | ▲2,297 | ▼9.2 | ▲5.5% | ▲8.9% | n/a | n/a |
| 1982 | ▲16.3 | ▲2,369 | ▼8.9 | ▼−0.5% | ▲13.7% | n/a | n/a |
| 1983 | ▲17.7 | ▲2,517 | ▲9.2 | ▲4.7% | ▲9.0% | n/a | n/a |
| 1984 | ▲19.4 | ▲2,726 | ▼9.1 | ▲5.7% | ▲8.6% | n/a | n/a |
| 1985 | ▲21.1 | ▲2,877 | ▲9.2 | ▲5.7% | ▲7.6% | n/a | n/a |
| 1986 | ▲21.3 | ▼2,784 | ▲9.9 | ▼−1.5% | ▲6.2% | n/a | n/a |
| 1987 | ▲23.2 | ▲2,980 | ▲10.7 | ▲6.7% | ▲8.2% | n/a | n/a |
| 1988 | ▲24.1 | ▲3,036 | ▲11.1 | ▲0.1% | ▲7.2% | n/a | n/a |
| 1989 | ▲25.7 | ▲3,179 | ▼11.1 | ▲2.6% | ▲7.7% | n/a | n/a |
| 1990 | ▲28.5 | ▲3,425 | ▲14.1 | ▲7.1% | ▲6.5% | 16.2% | n/a |
| 1991 | ▲30.7 | ▲3,611 | ▲14.9 | ▲4.1% | ▲7.7% | 16.2% | 63.3% |
| 1992 | ▲33.9 | ▲3,906 | ▲17.8 | ▲8.0% | ▲5.5% | 16.2% | ▼62.1% |
| 1993 | ▲35.6 | ▲4,016 | ▼16.7 | ▲2.5% | ▲4.0% | ▲16.3% | ▲63.8% |
| 1994 | ▲37.7 | ▲4,175 | ▲17.9 | ▲3.6% | ▲5.4% | 16.3% | ▲63.9% |
| 1995 | ▲39.5 | ▲4,309 | ▲20.6 | ▲2.7% | ▲6.2% | ▼16.2% | ▲65.6% |
| 1996 | ▲43.0 | ▲4,621 | ▲22.3 | ▲6.9% | ▲3.7% | ▼16.1% | ▲66.8% |
| 1997 | ▲46.2 | ▲4,903 | ▼21.8 | ▲5.7% | ▲3.6% | ▼15.9% | ▼66.6% |
| 1998 | ▲49.0 | ▲5,138 | ▲22.9 | ▲5.0% | ▲3.1% | ▲16.1% | ▼58.2% |
| 1999 | ▲52.7 | ▲5,459 | ▲24.1 | ▲6.0% | ▲2.8% | ▼16.0% | ▲61.9% |
| 2000 | ▲56.2 | ▲5,758 | ▼22.5 | ▲4.3% | ▲2.8% | ▼15.7% | ▲62.9% |
| 2001 | ▲59.7 | ▲6,046 | ▲23.1 | ▲3.8% | ▲1.9% | ▼15.1% | ▼52.2% |
| 2002 | ▲61.4 | ▲6,158 | ▲24.3 | ▲1.3% | ▲2.7% | ▲15.3% | ▼51.6% |
| 2003 | ▲65.6 | ▲6,509 | ▲28.8 | ▲4.7% | ▲2.7% | ▼14.5% | ▲52.6% |
| 2004 | ▲71.5 | ▲7,035 | ▲32.7 | ▲6.2% | ▲3.7% | ▼14.2% | ▼51.6% |
| 2005 | ▲76.3 | ▲7,443 | ▲33.9 | ▲3.5% | ▲1.9% | ▼12.8% | ▼50.0% |
| 2006 | ▲82.8 | ▲8,004 | ▲36.1 | ▲5.2% | ▲4.1% | ▼12.5% | ▼45.7% |
| 2007 | ▲90.8 | ▲8,693 | ▲40.8 | ▲6.7% | ▲3.4% | ▼12.4% | ▼42.7% |
| 2008 | ▲96.4 | ▲9,147 | ▲47.0 | ▲4.2% | ▲4.9% | 12.4% | ▼41.4% |
| 2009 | ▲100.0 | ▲9,388 | ▼45.6 | ▲3.0% | ▲3.5% | ▲13.3% | ▼40.3% |
| 2010 | ▲104.8 | ▲9,730 | ▲46.2 | ▲3.5% | ▲4.4% | ▼13.0% | ▼38.8% |
| 2011 | ▼104.7 | ▼9,620 | ▲48.1 | ▼−2.0% | ▲3.2% | ▲18.9% | ▲43.3% |
| 2012 | ▲111.2 | ▲10,098 | ▼47.3 | ▲4.2% | ▲4.6% | ▼16.7% | ▲49.0% |
| 2013 | ▲115.8 | ▲10,395 | ▲48.7 | ▲2.4% | ▲5.4% | ▼15.3% | ▼45.6% |
| 2014 | ▲121.5 | ▲10,774 | ▲50.3 | ▲3.1% | ▲4.6% | ▼15.0% | ▲50.7% |
| 2015 | ▲123.8 | ▲10,856 | ▼45.8 | ▲1.0% | ▲4.4% | ▲15.4% | ▲52.4% |
| 2016 | ▲126.4 | ▲10,960 | ▼44.4 | ▲1.1% | ▲3.6% | ▲15.5% | ▲58.9% |
| 2017 | ▲131.5 | ▲11,289 | ▼42.2 | ▲2.3% | ▲5.3% | 15.5% | ▲67.1% |
| 2018 | ▲139.3 | ▲11,841 | ▲42.7 | ▲2.6% | ▲7.3% | 15.5% | ▲72.9% |
| 2019 | ▲148.4 | ▲12,495 | ▼41.9 | ▲1.6% | ▲6.7% | ▼14.9% | ▼67.3% |
| 2020 | ▼142.7 | ▼11,918 | ▲42.5 | ▼−9.0% | ▲5.6% | ▲17.4% | ▲77.7% |
| 2021 | ▲149.1 | ▲12,375 | ▲46.8 | ▲4.7% | ▲5.7% | ▼16.2% | ▲79.7% |
| 2022 | ▲164.0 | ▲13,531 | ▼44.6 | ▲2.7% | ▲8.3% | ▼15.2% | ▲83.0% |
| 2023 | ▲170.5 | ▲13,971 | ▲48.5 | ▲0.2% | ▲9.3% | ▲16.4% | ▲84.0% |
| 2024 | ▲177.5 | ▲14,462 | ▲51.3 | ▲1.6% | ▲7.0% | ▼16.0% | ▲85.7% |
| 2025 | ▲187.1 | ▲15,154 | ▲57.6 | ▲2.5% | ▲5.3% | ▼15.2% | ▼81.3% |
| 2026 | ▲196.6 | ▲15,833 | ▲60.7 | ▲2.1% | ▲6.5% | n/a | ▲84.9% |

== External trade and investment ==
Exports of Tunisia by product category (2019) Chemical products Transportation Machines Mineral products Plastics and rubbers Metals Foodstuffs Precious metals Textiles Instruments Animal products Vegetable products Paper goods Footwear and headwear Miscellaneous Stone and glass Wood products Animal and vegetable bi-products Animal hides Arts and antiques Weapons

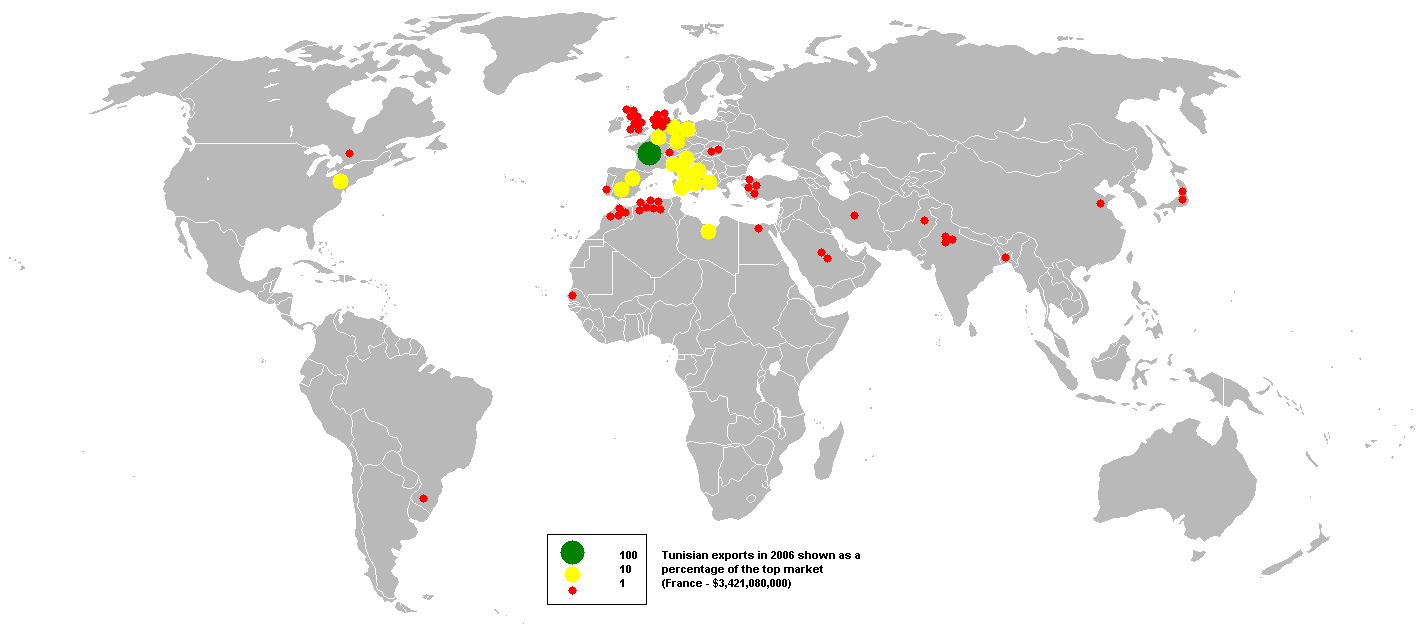
Tunisian exports in 2006

In 1992, Tunisia re-entered the private international capital market for the first time in 6 years, securing a $10-million line of credit for balance-of-payments support. In January 2003 Standard & Poor's affirmed its investment grade credit ratings for Tunisia. The World Economic Forum 2002-03 ranked Tunisia 34th in the Global Competitiveness Index Ratings (two places behind South Africa, the continent's leader). In April 2002, Tunisia's first US dollar-denominated sovereign bond issue since 1997 raised $458 million, with maturity in 2012.

The Bourse de Tunis is under the control of the state-run Financial Market Council and lists over 50 companies. The government offers substantial tax incentives to encourage companies to join the exchange, and expansion is occurring.

The Tunisian government adopted a unified investment code in 1993 to attract foreign capital. More than 1,600 export-oriented joint venture firms operate in Tunisia to take advantage of relatively low labor costs and preferential access to nearby European markets. Economic links are closest with European countries, which dominate Tunisia's trade. Tunisia's currency, the dinar, is not traded outside Tunisia. However, partial convertibility exists for bona fide commercial and investment transaction. Certain restrictions still limit operations carried out by Tunisian residents.

The stock market capitalisation of listed companies in Tunisia was valued at $5.3 Billion in 2007, 15% of 2007 GDP, by the World Bank.

For 2007, foreign direct investment totaled TN Dinar 2 billion in 2007, or 5.18% of the total volume of investment in the country. This figure is up 35.7% from 2006 and includes 271 new foreign enterprises and the expansion of 222 others already based in the country.

The economic growth rate seen for 2007, at 6.3% is the highest achieved in a decade.

On 29 and 30 November, Tunisia held an investment conference with country chiefs from all around the world with pledges that have reached $30 billion to finance new public projects.

As of 2022, Tunisia's government is in need of international help as the economy grapples with a crisis in public finances that has raised fears it may default on debt and has contributed to shortages of food and fuel, according to government critics. As a result, the government announced in December 2022 that they expect to reduce its fiscal deficit to 5.5% in 2023 from a forecast 7.7% this year, driven by austerity measures that could pave the way for a final deal with the International Monetary Fund on a rescue package. In 2025, Tunisia severed ties with the IMF.

Tunisia's exports to Libya, exceeding 18% growth between 2020 and 2024.

=== Loan guarantee ===
On 20 April 2012, U.S. Treasury Secretary and Tunisian Finance Minister Houcine Dimassi signed a declaration of intent to move forward on a U.S. loan guarantee for Tunisia. The U.S. Government would provide this loan guarantee to enable the Tunisian government to access significant market financing at affordable rates and favorable maturities with the backing of a U.S. guarantee of principal and interest (up to 100 percent).

The support would consist of the U.S. guarantee of Tunisian government-issued debt (or of bank loans made to the Government of Tunisia). This guarantee will significantly reduce the Tunisian government's borrowing costs at a time when market access has become more expensive for many emerging market countries. In the weeks ahead, both governments intend to make progress on a loan guarantee agreement that would allow Tunisia to move forward with a debt issuance.

The ceremony took place at the World Bank immediately following the meeting of Finance Ministers of the Deauville Partnership with Arab Countries in Transition.

Microfinance institutions, such as Enda Tamweel, exist to assist those who are unable to access the regular banking system. This comprises those living in rural or impoverished regions where the informal sector thrives, accounting for 34% of Tunisia's GDP.

Enda Tamweel has made over 3 million microloans to over 900,000 people in the 30 years since its inception, infusing more than €1.6 billion into the local economy.

== Sectors ==
=== Agriculture ===
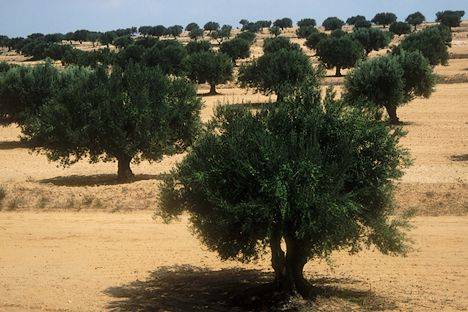
Olive grove in Sfax, Tunisia

Agriculture - products: olives, grain, tomatoes, citrus fruit, sugar beets, dates, almonds.

In 2018, Tunisia produced:

- 1.5 million tons of wheat;
- 1.3 million tons of tomato (16th largest producer in the world);
- 825 thousand tons of olives (7th largest producer in the world);
- 700 thousand tons of barley;
- 548 thousand tons of watermelon;
- 450 thousand tons of onion;
- 426 thousand tons of pepper;
- 423 thousand tons of potato;
- 241 thousand tons of date (10th largest producer in the world);
- 217 thousand tons of carrots;
- 146 thousand tons of grape;
- 144 thousand tons of orange;
- 118 thousand tons of peach;
- 114 thousand tons of apple;
- 104 thousand tons of grapefruit;
- 102 thousand tons of melon.

In addition to smaller productions of other agricultural products, like almond (66 thousand tons) and sugar beet (76 thousand tons).

=== Mining ===
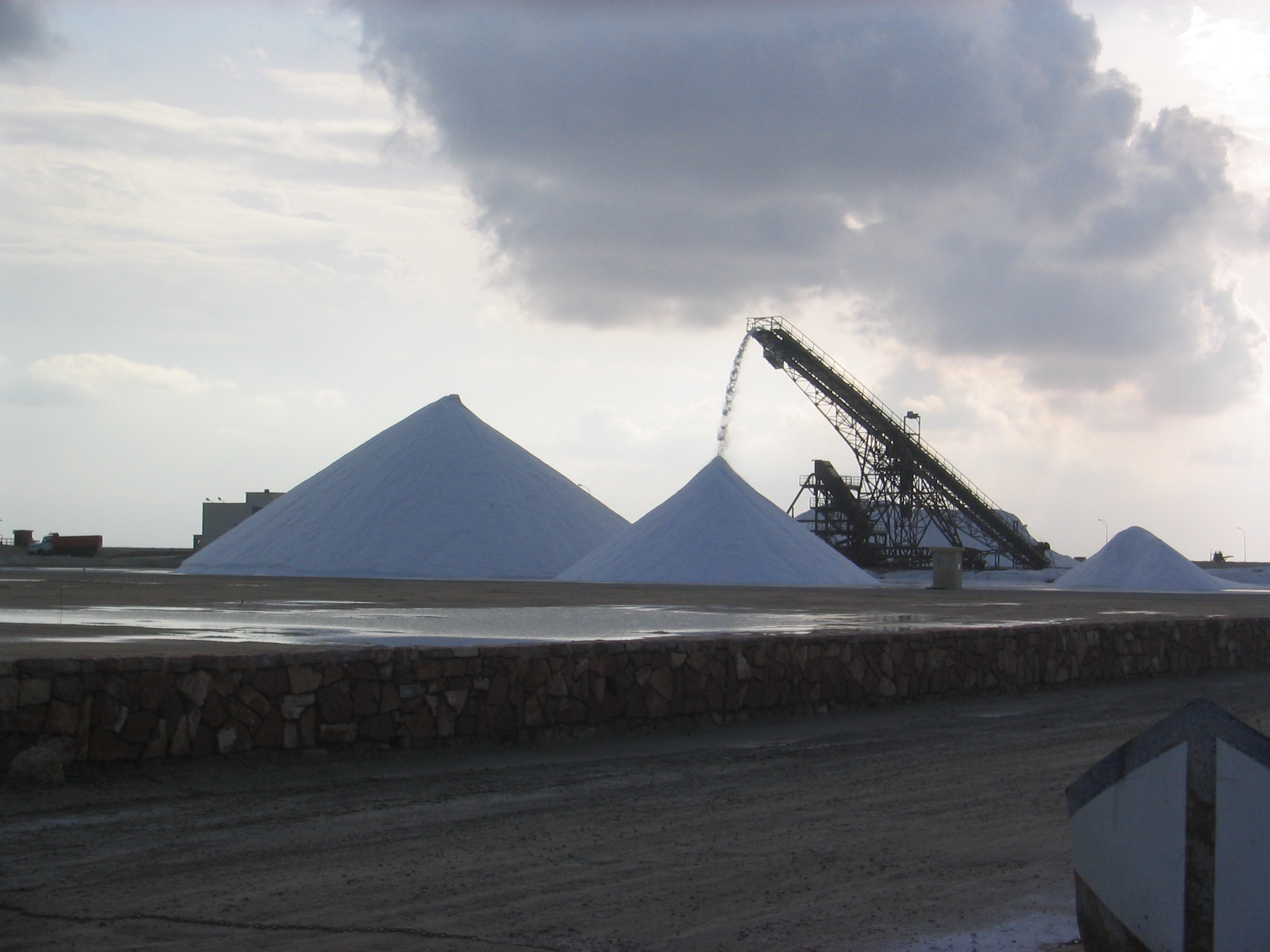
Salt evaporation pond operations at Zarzis

The mining industry of Tunisia focuses mainly on phosphate products such as fertilizer, industrial minerals (gypsum, clay, lime), iron ore, and salt. Mine ownership is limited to the Government of Tunisia, although operation by private entities is encouraged.

=== Tourism ===
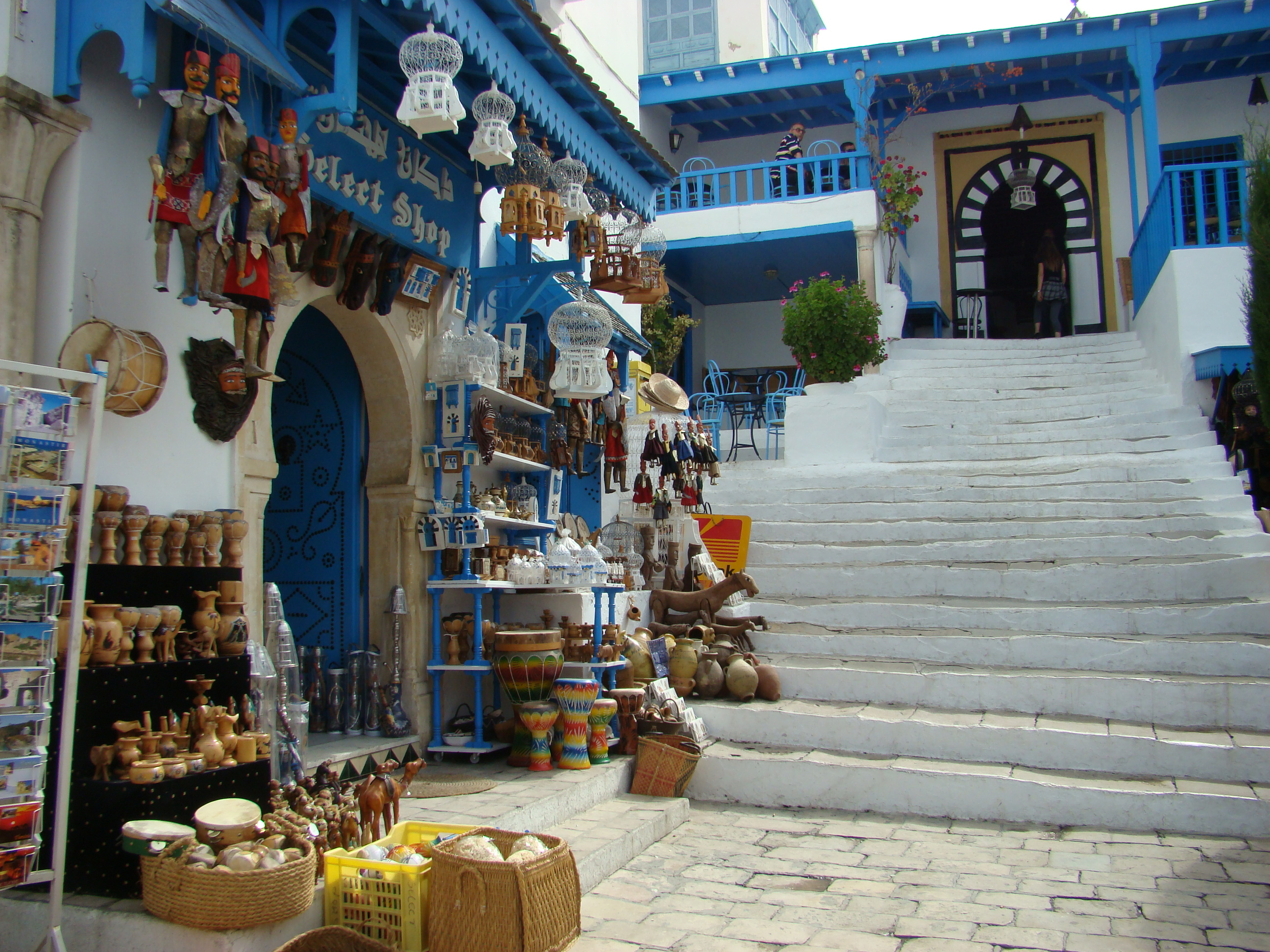
Sidi Bou Saïd, a major tourist destination

Tourism in Tunisia is a major industry, attracting around 9.4 million arrivals annually from the year 2016 to 2020, making it one of the most visited countries in Africa.

Among Tunisia's tourist attractions are its cosmopolitan capital city of Tunis, the ancient ruins of Carthage, the Muslim and Jewish quarters of Djerba, and coastal resorts outside Monastir. According to The New York Times, Tunisia is known for its "golden beaches, sunny weather, and affordable luxuries."

== Infrastructure ==
=== Energy ===
Tunisia's natural resources are modest when compared to those of its neighbors: Algeria and Libya. This modesty in natural resources forced the country to import oil, which contributed to the rise in the cost of gasoline: on 26 April 2006, the liter crossed the bar of one dinar to sell for 1.50 Tunisian dinars. (a price equivalent to European prices from the point of view of purchasing power parity). As July 2026 multiple regional grid failure occurred as consequences of extreme high summer temperatures, exceeding 49 °C, widespread forest fires damaging cables and sub-station, lack of proper maintenance of the grid and high demand overcoming national power generation capabilities.

=== Electricity ===
- Production: 16.13 Billion kWh (2011)
- Production by source:
  - fossil fuel: 96.8% (2010)
  - hydro: 1.7% (2010)
  - other: 1.5% (2010)
- Consumption: 13.29 billion kWh (2010)
- Exports: None (2010)
- Imports: 19 million kWh (2010)

=== Transport ===
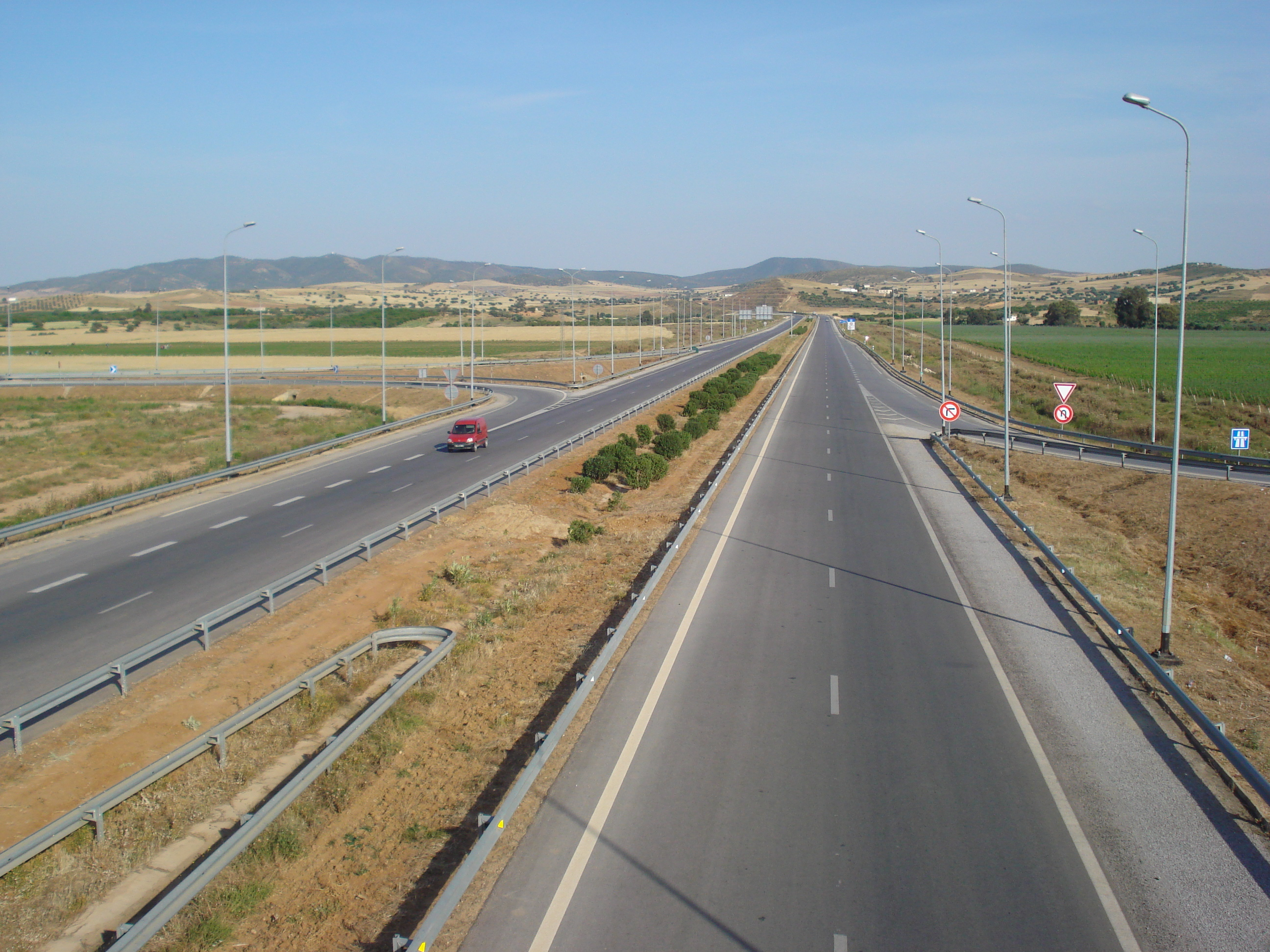
Autoroute A4 on (May 2008)

Tunisia has a number of international airports to service its sizable tourist trade. Tunis is the center of the transport system as the largest city having the largest port and a light transit system.

=== Telecommunications ===
Telecommunications in Tunisia includes telephones (fixed and mobile), radio, television, and the Internet. The Ministry of Communication Technologies, a cabinet-level governmental agency, is in charge of organizing the sector.

== Economic structure ==
In 2017, the breakdown by economic sector is as follows:

| Economy sector | contribution to GDP |
|---|---|
| Agriculture | 10,1 % |
| Industry | 26,2 % |
| Services | 63,8 % |

== See also ==
- Economy of Africa
- List of companies based in Tunisia
- United Nations Economic Commission for: Africa & Western Asia
