= Ferjani Bel Haj Ammar =

Tunisian politician (1916–2000)

Ferjani Bel Haj Ammar الفرجاني بالحاج عمار
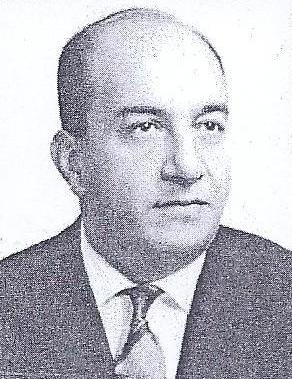
- Ferjani Bel Haj Ammar in 1956.

Deputy
- In office 1959–1984

Minister of the Economy
- In office 15 April 1956 – 29 July 1957
- Monarch: Lamine Bey
- President: Habib Bourguiba
- Prime Minister: Habib Bourguiba
- Preceded by: Mohamed Masmoudi
- Succeeded by: Ezzeddine Abassi

President of UTICA
- In office October 1960 – July 1988
- Preceded by: Mohamed Ben Abdelkader
- Succeeded by: Hédi Djilani

Personal details
- Born: Ferjani Bel Haj Ammar; 5 January 1916 Tunis, Tunisia
- Died: 2000 (aged 83-84) Tunis, Tunisia
- Party: Neo Destour / Socialist Destourian Party
- Profession: Waiter

Ferjani Bel Haj Ammar (Arabic: الفرجاني بالحاج عمار) (5 January 1916 – 2000) was a Tunisian trade unionist and politician. He was the Minister of the Economy (1956–1957) before becoming President of the Tunisian Confederation of Industry, Trade and Handicrafts for 28 years (1960–1988). He died in 2000, aged 83 or 84.

== Elections ==
Ferjani Bel Haj Ammar was elected to the Chamber of Deputies five times in total:

1959 Tunisian general election
1964 Tunisian general election
1969 Tunisian general election
1974 Tunisian general election
1979 Tunisian parliamentary election
