= Ministry of Culture (Tunisia) =

Government minister of Tunisia

Minister of Culture of Tunisia

- Incumbent; Hayet Guettat since 11 October 2021
- Inaugural holder: Chedli Klibi
- Formation: 7 October 1961

The Ministry of Culture of Tunisia (Arabic: وزارة الثقافة), established in 1961, is responsible for the government and general planning and running of cultural enterprises and pursuits in the country. Its headquarters are at Rue du 2-Mars 1934 in Tunis. The current Minister of Culture is Hayet Guettat. The ministry had a budget of 170,735 million (TND).

== Ministers ==
Image	Name	Party	Government	Started	Ended
	Chedli Klibi (1925-2020)	PSD	Government of Bahi Ladgham	7 October 1961	12 June 1970
	Habib Boularès (1933-2014)	PSD	Government of Bahi Ladgham; Government of Hédi Amara Nouira	12 June 1970	17 June 1971
	Chedli Klibi (1925-2020)	PSD	Government of Hédi Amara Nouira	24 June 1971	30 November 1973
	Mahmoud Messadi (1911-2004)	PSD	Government of Hédi Amara Nouira	30 November 1973	9 December 1976
	Chedli Klibi (1925-2020)	PSD	Government of Hédi Amara Nouira	9 December 1976	20 September 1978
	Mohamed Yaâlaoui (1924-2005)	PSD	Government of Hédi Amara Nouira	20 September 1978	7 November 1979
	Fouad Mebazaa (1933-)	PSD	Government of Hédi Amara Nouira; Government of Mohammed Mzali	7 November 1979	2 January 1981
	Béchir Ben Slama (1931-2023)	PSD	Government of Mohamed Mzali	2 January 1981	12 May 1986
	Zakaria Ben Mustapha (1925-2019)	PSD	Government of Mohamed Mzali; Government of Rachid Sfar	12 May 1986	29 September 1987
	Abdelaziz Ben Dhia (1936-2015)	PSD	Government of Rachid Sfar	29 September 1987	2 October 1987
	Zakaria Ben Mustapha (1925-2019)	PSD; RCD	Government of Zine El Abidine Ben Ali; Government of Hédi Baccouche	2 October 1987	12 April 1988
	Abdelmalek Laârif (1942-)	RCD	Government of Hédi Baccouche	12 April 1988	27 July 1988
	Habib Boularès (1933-2014)	RCD	Government of Hédi Baccouche; Government of Hamed Karoui	27 July 1988	3 March 1990
	Ahmed Khaled	RCD	Government of Hamed Karoui	3 March 1990	20 February 1991
	Moncer Rouissi (1940-2021)	RCD	Government of Hamed Karoui	20 February 1991	11 October 1991
	Mongi Bousnina	RCD	Government of Hamed Karoui	11 October 1991	1995
	Salah Baccari (1947-)	RCD	Government of Hamed Karoui	1995	July 1996
	Abdelbaki Hermassi (1937-2021)	RCD	Government of Hamed Karoui; Government of Mohamed Ghannouchi (1)	July 1996	10 November 2004
	Mohamed El Aziz Ben Achour (1951-)	RCD	Government of Mohamed Ghannouchi (1)	10 November 2004	29 August 2008
	Abderraouf El Basti (1947-)	RCD	Government of Mohamed Ghannouchi (1)	29 August 2008	17 January 2011
	Moufida Tlatli (1947-2021)	Independent	Government of Mohamed Ghannouchi (2)	17 January 2011	27 January 2011
	Azedine Beschaouch (1938-)	Independent	Government of Mohamed Ghannouchi (2); Government of Béji Caïd Essebsi	27 January 2011	24 December 2011
	Mehdi Mabrouk (1963-)	Independent	Government of Hamadi Jebali; Government of Ali Larayedh	24 December 2011	29 January 2014
	Mourad Sakli (1965-)	Independent	Government of Mehdi Jomaa	29 January 2014	6 February 2015
	Latifa Lakhdar (1956-)	Independent	Government of Habib Essid	6 February 2015	12 January 2016
	Sonia M'barek (1969-)	Independent	Government of Habib Essid	12 January 2016	27 August 2016
	Mohamed Zine El Abidine	Independent	Government of Youssef Chahed	27 August 2016	27 February 2020
	Chiraz Latiri (1972-)	Independent	Government of Elyes Fakhfakh	27 February 2020	2 September 2020
	Walid Zidi (1986-)	Independent	Government of Hichem Mechichi	2 September 2020	5 October 2020
	Habib Ammar (acting) (1967-)	Independent	Government of Hichem Mechichi	5 October 2020	11 October 2021
	Hayet Guettat	Independent	Government of Najla Bouden	11 October 2021	In course
