= List of presidents of Tunisia =

The president of Tunisia is the head of state of Tunisia, directly elected to a five-year term by the people. The officeholder leads the executive branch of the Tunisian government along with the prime minister and is the commander-in-chief of the Tunisian Armed Forces.

Since the office was established in 1957, five men have served as president. The seventh and current president is Kais Saied since 23 October 2019. There are currently three living former presidents. The most recent former president to die was Zine El Abidine Ben Ali, on 19 September 2019.

The presidency of Mohamed Ennaceur, who assumed the office as acting president following the death of incumbent president Beji Caid Essebsi, was the shortest in Tunisian history (90 days). Habib Bourguiba, the inaugural holder, served the longest, over thirty years (1957–1987), before he was removed from office by his prime minister Ben Ali, on 7 November 1987. Since the ratification of the Tunisian Constitution in 2014, no person may be elected president more than twice.

Of those who have served as the nation's president, only one died in office of natural causes (Beji Caid Essebsi), two were removed from office (Habib Bourguiba and Zine El Abidine Ben Ali) and two assumed the office as acting presidents (Fouad Mebazaa and Mohamed Ennaceur).

== Background ==
Tunisia has had seven presidents since the proclamation of the republic on 25 July 1957:

- Habib Bourguiba was appointed president by the parliament on 25 July 1957, until the election of a permanent president. After the Constitution was enacted on 1 June 1959, a presidential election was held on 8 November 1959. Being the only one running for office, he gained 91% of the votes to serve a five-year term. He was elected unopposed three more times. Shortly after winning his fourth full term, he was proclaimed president for life. He remained in office until being deposed in the coup d'état of 7 November 1987, organized by his prime minister, Ben Ali.
- Zine El Abidine Ben Ali was prime minister and interior minister under Bourguiba. Ben Ali had Bourguiba declared medically unfit to serve 7 November 1987. Per the constitution, he became acting president pending new elections. Ben Ali was elected unopposed for a full five-year term on 2 April 1989, and was reelected three more times (the first time unopposed). On 14 January 2011, his regime fell in the Tunisian Revolution that started on 17 December 2010. Mohamed Ghannouchi, his prime minister, claimed the presidency, serving as acting president.
- Fouad Mebazaa was designated by the Constitutional Council to serve as acting president on 15 January 2011. Under Article 57 of the constitution, an election should have taken place between 45 and 60 days following Mebazaa's appointment. But on 3 March 2011, he announced the repeal of the 1959 constitution and the election of a constituent assembly which had to draft a new one. Therefore, he remained acting president pending new elections.
- Moncef Marzouki was elected president by the Tunisian Constituent Assembly on 12 December 2011. The next day, he was inaugurated, making him the first president not to be member of the ruling party. During the 2014 presidential election, he was defeated by former prime minister Caid Essebsi and left office on 31 December 2014.
- Beji Caid Essebsi became the first president to be elected by universal suffrage after the revolution, on 21 December 2014. On 31 December 2014, he took office as the fifth president of Tunisia, and the first to be freely elected. He died on 25 July 2019, and was succeeded by Mohamed Ennaceur as acting president.
- Mohamed Ennaceur became acting president in accordance with Articles 84 and 85 of the constitution on 25 July 2019, following the death in office of President Essebsi. Per the constitution, Ennaceur was to serve as acting president for no more than 90 days, during which an early presidential election was to be held. An election had already been scheduled for November 2019, but was brought forward to September to ensure that a new president would be sworn in before the 90-day limit.
- Kais Saied was elected in September 2019. He took office on 23 October as the second president (Marzouki being the first) who was not an heir to Bourguiba's legacy.

== Presidents ==
No.	Portrait	Name (Birth–Death)	Term of office	Party	Election	Notes
1		Habib Bourguiba (1903–2000)	25 July 1957 – 7 November 1987	Neo-Destour	Interim	Parliament abolished the monarchy and designated Prime Minister Bourguiba as interim president.
1		Habib Bourguiba (1903–2000)	25 July 1957 – 7 November 1987	Neo-Destour	1959	Bourguiba won the first presidential election in Tunisia's history.
1		Habib Bourguiba (1903–2000)	25 July 1957 – 7 November 1987	SDP	1964	Bourguiba won his second presidential term.
1		Habib Bourguiba (1903–2000)	25 July 1957 – 7 November 1987	SDP	1969	Bourguiba won his third and last presidential term according to the constitution.
1		Habib Bourguiba (1903–2000)	25 July 1957 – 7 November 1987	SDP	1974	After this election, Bourguiba proclaimed himself president for life.
2		Zine El Abidine Ben Ali (1936–2019)	7 November 1987 – 14 January 2011	SDP	Interim	Following the 1987 coup d'état, Prime Minister Ben Ali took office as interim president.
2		Zine El Abidine Ben Ali (1936–2019)	7 November 1987 – 14 January 2011	DCR	1989	Ben Ali won the first presidential election in 15 years.
2		Zine El Abidine Ben Ali (1936–2019)	7 November 1987 – 14 January 2011	DCR	1994	Ben Ali won his second presidential term.
2		Zine El Abidine Ben Ali (1936–2019)	7 November 1987 – 14 January 2011	DCR	1999	Ben Ali won his third presidential term and Tunisia's first pluralist presidential election.
2		Zine El Abidine Ben Ali (1936–2019)	7 November 1987 – 14 January 2011	DCR	2004	Ben Ali won his fourth presidential term after being allowed according to the 2002 constitutional referendum.
2		Zine El Abidine Ben Ali (1936–2019)	7 November 1987 – 14 January 2011	DCR	2009	Ben Ali won his fifth and last presidential term before being deposed.
—		Fouad Mebazaa (1933–2025)	15 January 2011 – 13 December 2011	DCR (Note: Mebazaa left the party leadership on January 18 and the DCR was dissolved on 9 March 2011.)	Interim	Mebazaa, as speaker of Parliament, became interim president following the removal of Ben Ali by the Constitutional Council.
—		Fouad Mebazaa (1933–2025)	15 January 2011 – 13 December 2011	Independent	Interim	Mebazaa's term was extended until the election of a Constituent Assembly after the constitution was repealed.
3		Moncef Marzouki (b. 1945)	13 December 2011 – 31 December 2014	CFR	2011	Marzouki was not elected directly, but was elected temporarily by the Constituent Assembly until the next election.
4		Beji Caid Essebsi (1926–2019)	31 December 2014 – 25 July 2019 †	Nidaa Tounes	2014	Essebsi won the first two-round presidential election, and was the first president to die in office.
—		Mohamed Ennaceur (b. 1934)	25 July 2019 – 23 October 2019	Nidaa Tounes	Interim	Ennaceur, as speaker of Parliament, became interim president following the death of President Beji Caid Essebsi.
5 (Note: The official website of the president of Tunisia considers Saied to be the seventh to hold the office, as no distinctions are made between elected and interim presidents.)		Kais Saied (b. 1958)	23 October 2019 – Incumbent	Independent	2019	Saied won the first presidential election in which a presidential debate was held.
5		Kais Saied (b. 1958)	23 October 2019 – Incumbent	Independent	2024	Saied won his second presidential term. The first president to be reelected in 15 years.

== Rank by time in office ==
Habib Bourguiba; Longest presidency: 30 years, 105 days 1957–1987	Mohamed Ennaceur; Shortest presidency: 90 days 2019

Rank	President	Time in office
1	Habib Bourguiba	30 years, 105 days
2	Zine El Abidine Ben Ali	23 years, 68 days
3	Kais Saied	6 years, 301 days
4	Beji Caid Essebsi	4 years, 206 days
5	Moncef Marzouki	3 years, 18 days
6	Fouad Mebazaa (Acting President)	332 days
7	Mohamed Ennaceur (Acting President)	90 days

== See also ==
- Politics of Tunisia
- List of beys of Tunis
- List of French residents-general in Tunisia
- President of Tunisia
  - First Lady of Tunisia
- Prime Minister of Tunisia
  - List of prime ministers of Tunisia
