= Zakaria Ben Mustapha =

Tunisian politician (1925–2019)

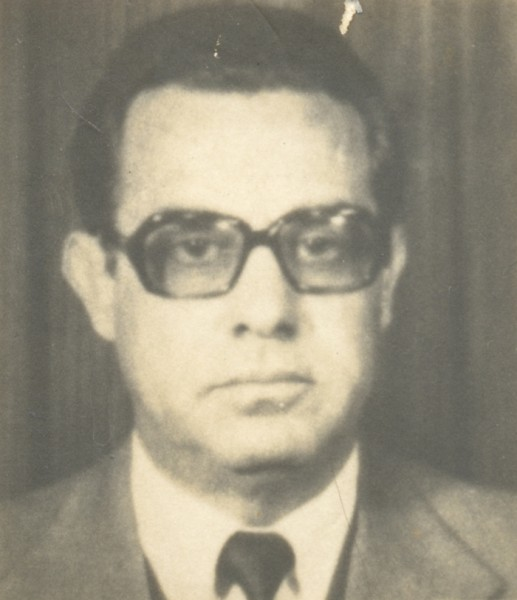

Minister of Culture
- In office October 2, 1987 – April 12, 1988
- President: Habib Bourguiba; Zine el-Abidine Ben Ali
- Prime Minister: Zine el-Abidine Ben Ali; Hédi Baccouche
- Preceded by: Abdelaziz Ben Dhia
- Succeeded by: Abdelmalek Laârif

Minister of Culture and Information
- In office May 12, 1986 – September 29, 1987
- President: Habib Bourguiba
- Prime Minister: Mohamed Mzali; Rachid Sfar
- Preceded by: Béchir Ben Slama
- Succeeded by: Abdelaziz Ben Dhia

Mayor of Tunis
- In office 1980 – May 13, 1986
- Preceded by: Salah Aouidj
- Succeeded by: Mohamed Ali Bouleymane

Governor of Sfax Governorate
- In office 1969–1970
- Preceded by: Hédi Baccouche
- Succeeded by: Hédi Mkaddem

Governor of Gabès Governorate
- In office 1967–1969
- Preceded by: Ahmed Bellalouna
- Succeeded by: Hédi Baccouche

Personal details
- Born: July 7, 1925
- Died: June 4, 2019 (aged 93)
- Party: Socialist Destourian Party (PSD); Democratic Constitutional Rally (RCD)

Zakaria Ben Mustapha (July 7, 1925 – June 4, 2019) was a Tunisian politician. He served as the Minister of Culture from 1987 to 1988 and the Mayor of Tunis from 1980 until 1986.

Mustapha died on June 4, 2019, at the age of 94.
