= Béchir Ben Slama =

Tunisian writer and politician (1931–2023)

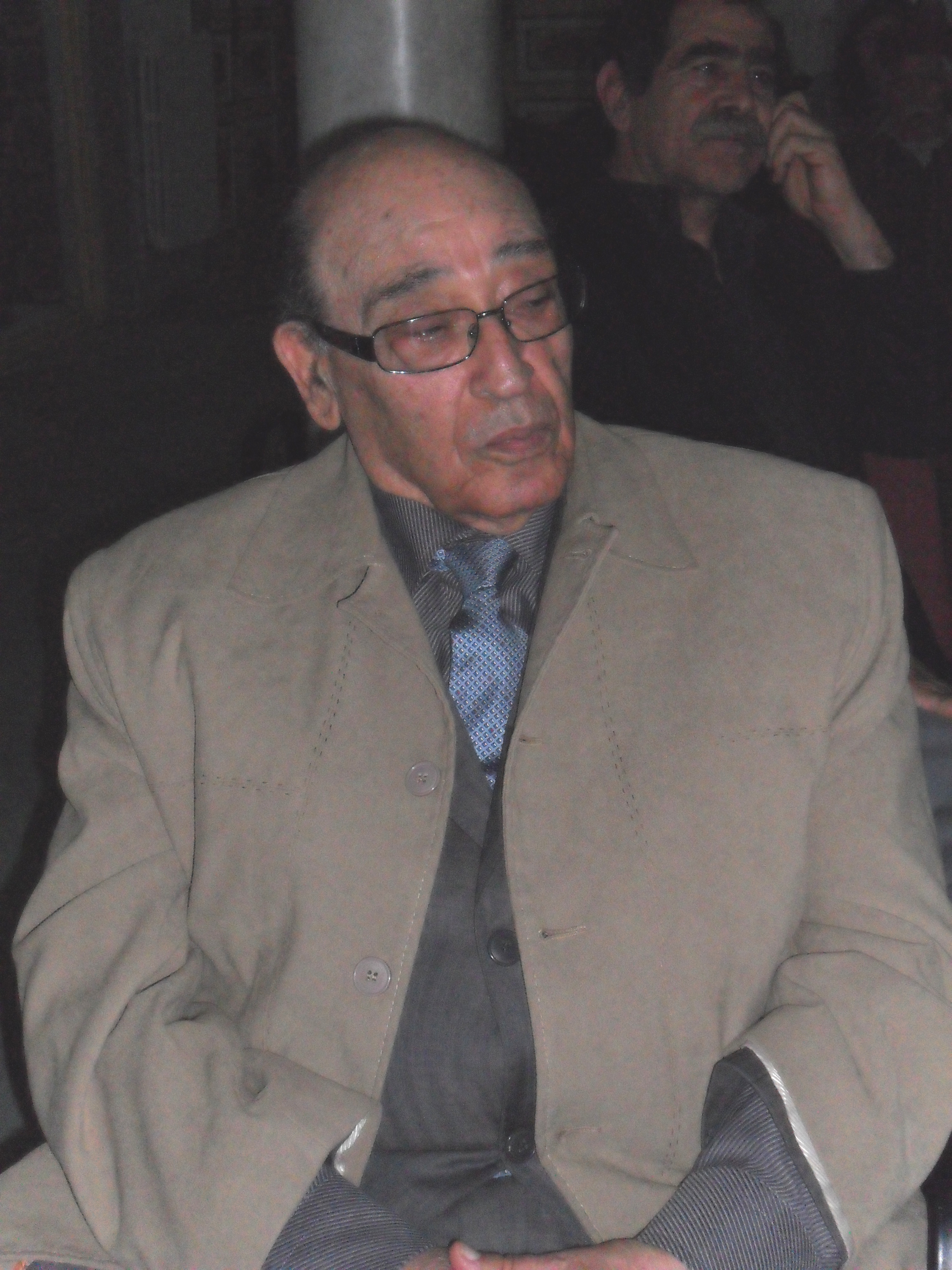
- Ben Slama in 2013

Minister of Culture
- In office 2 January 1981 – 12 May 1986
- Preceded by: Fouad Mebazaa
- Succeeded by: Zakaria Ben Mustapha

Personal details
- Born: 14 October 1931 Le Bardo, French protectorate of Tunisia
- Died: 26 February 2023 (aged 91)
- Party: Neo Destour; Socialist Destourian
- Education: Sadiki College; École normale supérieure de Tunis
- Profession: Writer

Béchir Ben Slama (Arabic: بشير بن سلامة; 14 October 1931 – 26 February 2023) was a Tunisian writer and politician.

== Biography ==
Born in Le Bardo on 14 October 1931, Ben Slama attended primary and secondary school at Sadiki College. He was admitted to the École normale supérieure de Tunis in 1956, where he studied the Arabic language and French literature. He then began teaching at the Lycée Alaoui but quit in 1963 to pursue a political career.

Ben Slama was elected to the Chamber of Deputies in 1969, where he remained for three terms. He became a leader within the Socialist Destourian Party in 1980. On 2 January 1981, he was appointed Minister of Culture. During his mandate, he established the Tunisian Academy of Sciences, Letters, and Arts and the National Theatre of Tunisia. He left his position on 12 May 1986.

Béchir Ben Slama died on 26 February 2023, at the age of 91.
