= Mohamed Ali Bouleymane =

Tunisian politician (1942–2021)

Mayor of Tunis
- In office 1990–2000
- Preceded by: Ahmed Belkhodja
- Succeeded by: Abbès Mohsen
- In office 1986–1988
- Preceded by: Zakaria Ben Mustapha
- Succeeded by: Ahmed Belkhodja

Secretary of State to the for Housing and Regional Planning to the Ministry of Equipment
- In office 12 April 1988 – 3 March 1990
- President: Zine El Abidine Ben Ali

Personal details
- Born: 10 May 1942
- Died: 4 October 2021 (aged 79)
- Party: PSD; RCD

Mohamed Ali Bouleymane (Arabic: محمد علي بوليمان; 10 May 1942 – 4 October 2021) was a Tunisian politician. He served as Mayor of Tunis from 1986 to 1988 and again from 1990 to 2000. He also served as Secretary of State for Housing and Regional Planning to the Ministry of Equipment from 1988 to 1990.

== Biography ==
Bouleymane studied at HEC Paris. He became mayor of Tunis in 1986 and was appointed to work for the Ministry of Equipment in 1988. Following this mandate, he returned to serving as mayor of Tunis from 1990 to 2000, when he was removed by President Zine El Abidine Ben Ali.

Following his political career, Bouleymane became president of the board of directors of the Société Italo-Tunisienne d'Exploitation Pétrolière and Director of the Groupe chimique tunisien. He was also Vice-President of the United Towns Organisation. In 2011, he became a member of the board of directors of Candax Energy and was also non-executive president of Ecumed Petroleum.

Bouleymane died on 4 October 2021, at the age of 79.

== Decorations ==
- Commander of the Legion of Honour
