= List of ambassadors of Tunisia to China =

Coordinates: 39.942949°N 116.458281°E

Ambassador of Tunisia to China
- Incumbent; Dhia Khaled since December 19, 2016
- Inaugural holder: Ridha Klibi
- Formation: December 28, 1973

The Tunisian Ambassador in Beijing is the official representative of the Government in Tunis to the Government of China and is also accredited in Pyongyang (North Korea), Phnom Penh (Cambodia) and Vientiane (Laos).

== List of representatives ==
Diplomatic agreement/Diplomatic accreditation	Ambassador	Observations	Head of Government of Tunisia	Premier of the People's Republic of China	Term end
January 11, 1964		The governments of Tunez and Beijing established diplomatic relations.	Habib Bourguiba	Zhou Enlai	
September 26, 1967		Closure of the Embassy in Tunez	Habib Bourguiba	Zhou Enlai	October 8, 1971
December 28, 1973	Ridha Klibi	Peking, December 28, 1973 ( HSINHUA )--Ridha Klibi, first ambassador extraordinary and	Hédi Nouira	Zhou Enlai	August 1, 1976
October 1, 1976	Mohamed al-Memmi	Mohamed El Memmi	Hédi Nouira	Hua Guofeng	August 1, 1981
August 1, 1981	Ridha Bach Baouab	R. Bachbaouab	Mohamed Mzali	Zhao Ziyang	February 1, 1987
March 1, 1987	Taoufik Smida		Zine el-Abidine Ben Ali	Li Peng	August 1, 1990
September 1, 1990	Salah Jebali		Hamed Karoui	Li Peng	October 1, 1991
November 1, 1991	Mohamed Habib Kaabachi	Mohaaaed Habib Kaabachi: In 2004 he was ambassador to Amman Jordania	Hamed Karoui	Li Peng	August 1, 1994
November 5, 1994	Abdelhamid Ben Messaouda	In 1992 he was ambassador in Tokyo.	Hamed Karoui	Li Peng	January 1, 1997
January 1, 1997	Mohammed Mongi Lahbib		Hamed Karoui	Li Peng	January 1, 2001
April 7, 2002	Salah Hamdi		Mohamed Ghannouchi	Zhu Rongji	November 1, 2004
March 25, 2005	Mohammed Sahbi Basly	November 28, 2006: Diplomatic accreditation	Mohamed Ghannouchi	Wen Jiabao	August 12, 2010
July 4, 2013	Tarek Amri		Ali Laarayedh	Li Keqiang	December 19, 2016
December 19, 2016	Dhia Khaled		Youssef Chahed	Li Keqiang	

- China–Tunisia relations
