= Arab Islamic Republic =

Proposed unification of Tunisia and Libya

Arab Islamic Republic الجمهورية العربية الإسلامية (Arabic) al-Jumhûriyya al-Arabiyya al-İslâmiyya
- Flag

- Status: Proposed by Muammar Gaddafi until his assassination in 2011
- Capital: Tripoli
- Official languages: Arabic
- Religion: Islam (official religion)

Area
  - Total: 1,923,151 km^{2} (742,533 sq mi)
- Today part of: Libya; Tunisia

The Arab Islamic Republic (Arabic: الجمهورية العربية الإسلامية, romanized: al-Jumhūriyya al-ʿArabiyyah al-Islāmiyya) was a proposed unification of Tunisia and Libya in 1974, agreed upon by Libyan head of state Muammar Gaddafi and Tunisian President Habib Bourguiba. Additional countries—Morocco and Algeria—were later included in the proposal, which was never implemented.

With the death of Egyptian President Gamal Abdel Nasser in September 1970, Muammar Gaddafi sought to establish himself as the figurehead of Pan-Arabism. After a failed attempt at rapprochement between his country and Egypt, he turned to Tunisia. In December 1972, President Bourguiba expressed his disagreement with a proposed union. But on January 12, 1974, the two presidents, meeting on the Mediterranean island of Djerba, agreed on an agreement providing for a union of their countries within an Arab Islamic Republic (AIR), which would have only one constitution, one army, and one flag.

== Regional context ==
The attempted merger between Tunisia and Libya took place in a historical and regional context. Maghrebi regional politics played a role embedded into the constitutions of Tunisia, Morocco and Algeria is the ideal of Maghrebi unity, however contradicting this ideal is the competing interests of Morocco and Algeria, the region's two major powers. According to Tunisian scholar Habib Slim, "if there were only Algeria and not Morocco, or Morocco and not Algeria, there could never have been a Maghrib. The major power would have swallowed us all up. To have the Maghrib you need those two rival powers competing with each other in the region". Thus, attempts at unification within the Maghreb were more often than not the means by which to counterbalance one or both of the region's major powers.

Additionally, Pan-Arabism influenced the politics of the Arab world. Muammar Gaddafi was a well-known proponent of this ideology and had thus worked to achieve union with several Arab states such as Egypt, Syria, Sudan and Tunisia. He also sought union with Chad. Tunisia was initially suspicious of Gaddafi's intentions, but the Libyan leader visited Tunis in February 1971 and December 1972, and, in a rally in that city during the latter visit, spoke of supporting a union between Libya and Tunisia. Hearing the speech by Gaddafi live at his home over the radio, President Bourguiba rushed to the rally where, after he let Gaddafi finish, he took to the stage and denounced the idea that "the Arabs had ever been united, dismissed all of [Gaddafi's] ideas about rapid Arab unity, and even took the Libyans to task for what he described as their own lack of national unity and their backwardness". Close Libyan-Egyptian ties troubled Maghrebi leaders who feared the proximity of Egypt on their eastern borders and thus worked to pull Libya away from Egyptian influence. At the fourth annual Non-Aligned Movement conference in Algiers, Bourguiba called for the unification of Algeria, Tunisia and Libya to form a "United States of North Africa", a move which he qualified by proposing it take place in stages over an "unspecified period of time".

== Background ==
Tunisia's interest in the Union was shaped in part by economic considerations, including limited natural resources and rising social pressures in the early 1970s. In contrast, Libya possessed significant oil wealth, which made closer integration potentially attractive to Tunisian policymakers. Libyan leader Muammar Gaddafi, meanwhile, promoted the merger as part of a broader commitment to pan-Arab unity.

According to the historian Geoff Simons, Bourguiba's support for the agreement may have been influenced by both economic considerations and strategic concerns regarding regional alliances.

== Djerba Declaration ==
On 11 January 1974, the Djerba Declaration was signed by Bourguiba and Gaddafi, which committed the two states to becoming a single state, to be named the Arab Islamic Republic. The agreement was signed on the island of Djerba and thus, is also known as the Djerba Declaration or the Djerba Accord. Referendums were scheduled in each country to vote on the issue. The spontaneous tactic in trying to gain unity with another state on the part of Gaddafi displays a different approach than the previous union attempt with Egypt, where long negotiations did not work out. It is possible that Bourguiba was the original pursuant of a union between Libya and Tunisia, as Bourguiba wanted a regional ally and also wanted to "wean Libya away from Egypt".

The union agreement was a surprise to observers, as it had been thought that Bourguiba did not support the idea, in part due to tensions brought about by the speech by Gaddafi in Tunis in December 1972. This change in support could also have been influenced by the presence of 30,000 Tunisians working in Libya at the time and helping the Tunisian economy. As Tunisia suffered from a labour surplus, a substantial foreign debt and a lack of natural resources; a closer economic union with the resource-rich but labour-poor Libya would have been an attractive alternative. Bourguiba's decision to agree to the union is not completely obvious, but it is clear that the Djerba agreement was seen with suspicion by Tunisians and Algerians, as well as outside these states both regionally and internationally.

The Arab Islamic Republic was intended to have "a single constitution, a single army, and a single President." Under the agreement, Bourguiba was to be president, but Gaddafi wanted to keep the Ministry of Defense. Prior to the Djerba Declaration, multiple agreements dealing with singular, separate issues had been arranged between the two states on "trade, customs duties, investment, regulation for migrant workers, social security, and the creation of a joint shipping company", but the agreements were not publicly noted as pursuing a union of the two states. Support for the unity beyond Bourguiba came from others within the Tunisian government, who thought that it would further benefit the Tunisian economy; its most prominent supporter being Tunisian Foreign Minister Mohamed Masmoudi.

The length of time the union lasted is contentious, with one source saying it lasted one month, while another says it lasted only a single day and a third indicating it lasted a few days. What is known, though, is that Tunisia reconsidered the deal soon after signing it, as the government was supportive of economic benefits gained from the union, but not wanting to give up Tunisian sovereignty. Thus, the Tunisian Socialist Destourian Party resisted the union plans, due to their view that the arrangement was not clear enough, and did not include how political institutions would be structured. Bourguiba then rescinded his decision to form the Arab Islamic Republic. The referendum in Tunisia was postponed to March 20, 1974, as announced on January 12, 1974. Following Bourguiba's removal of Tunisia from the agreement, the biggest supporter of the union, Tunisian Foreign Minister Masmoudi, was fired.

Before the agreement was dissolved, Gaddafi had believed that one merger within the region would lead to a regional unification and ultimately to a total unification of the Arab world. Following the union's inception and fallout, Bourguiba's judgement and capacity to lead Tunisia was questioned after he announced the union with Libya. Bechir Ben Yahmed, a Tunisian journalist noted, "For me, he [Bourguiba] died in January, 1974, in Djerba, when during several minutes of face-to-face with Gaddafi, he signed, on hotel stationary, that famous charter of union."

== Failure of the Djerba Declaration ==
As a consequence of the ideological differences, there was also a considerable divergence as to what the merger would look like. As understood by Bourguiba, the states themselves would not dissipate, but rather their borders would become "cooperatively permeable" through "functional integration", in a similar manner to the contemporary Arab Maghreb Union, formed over a decade later. Conversely, Gaddafi was said to be more interested in a complete merging of Libya and Tunisia into the Arab Islamic Republic. He saw Libya as a revolutionary movement rather than a territorial state. Gaddafi felt that they were one people, and that the borders were only a product of the ruling elites and imperialist division by conquerors.

Finally, there were the regional political factors. As has been mentioned before, Libyan-Egyptian relations were steadily deteriorating following 1973. In light of the reduced Egyptian threat, Algeria felt it no longer necessary and even undesirable to merge with Libya and was not in favour of Tunisia doing so either. Thus, within twenty four hours of the Republic's announcement, Algeria threatened Tunisia with military intervention if Tunisia went ahead with the unification. There were also accusations of Tunisian foreign ministers being bribed by Libya. As a result, the unification with Libya never happened and relations between the two countries steadily deteriorated.

== Aftermath of the Union ==
The aftermath of the Djerba Declaration revealed many of the same problems that had affected earlier pan-Arab unity projects. Historians have often compared the proposed Arab Islamic Republic to the United Arab Republic (1958–1961), the union between Egypt and Syria. Both projects were driven by the broader idea of Arab unity and the belief that political integration could strengthen the Arab world politically and economically. Yet, like the Libyan-Tunisian union, the United Arab Republic ultimately failed because of political disagreements, competing national interests, and tensions over how power would be shared between the participating states.

At the time, contemporary newspapers described the agreement as both sudden and highly ambitious. International reporting stressed the unexpected nature of the announcement and noted that Libyan and Tunisian leaders planned to organize a referendum to officially approve the union.

In practice, however, the project quickly ran into opposition, especially within Tunisia. Members of the government, political figures, and trade union leaders expressed concerns about the speed of the agreement and the possible consequences for Tunisian sovereignty. As support weakened, the union project was gradually abandoned before any real institutions could be created. Although the Arab Islamic Republic never moved beyond the declaration stage. it remains an important example of the difficulties faced by pan-Arab unity movements in the 1960s 1970s.

== Duration and historiography ==
Historians differ on how long the Arab Islamic Republic formally existed. Some accounts describe the union as lasting only a single day, which reflected the rapid political reversal that followed its announcement. Considering it lasted only one day also emphasizes the immediate political backlash in Tunisia and President Habib Bourguiba's rapid repudiation of the project shortly after the Djerba Declaration was announced. In this interpretation, the union effectively collapsed before any institutional structures could be created, making it more a symbolic diplomatic gesture than a functioning state. Other historians argue that the agreement technically remained nominally in place for several weeks, since no formal legal cancellation occurred immediately after the declaration. From this perspective, the Arab Islamic Republic continued to exist nominally until Tunisian authorities gradually distanced themselves from the project and abandoned preparations for implementation under mounting domestic and international pressure. This discrepancy reflects historiographical differences regarding whether the union should be dated from the signing of the Djerba Declaration or from its practical implementation, which never occurred.

== See also ==
- Arab Maghreb Union, an economic and political union between Maghreb states
- Federation of Arab Republics, a weak union between Libya, Egypt, and Syria around the same time
- Pan-Arabism , ideology whose idea is the unification of the Arab world
- United Arab Republic
- Arab Federation , short-lived confederation of Iraq and Jordan
- Tunisia
- Bourguiba
- Gaddafi
