= 1989 Tunisian general election =

General election in Tunisia

- 2 April 1989
- Presidential election
Nominee	Zine El Abidine Ben Ali
Party	PSD
Popular vote	2,087,028
Percentage	100%
President before election
Zine El Abidine Ben Ali
PSD
Elected President
Zine El Abidine Ben Ali
PSD

General elections were held in Tunisia on 2 April 1989. It was the first time presidential elections had been held since 1974, as Habib Bourguiba had been declared President-for-life the following year. However, Bourguiba was declared medically unfit to rule in 1987, and was succeeded by Prime Minister Zine El Abidine Ben Ali. In the presidential election, Ben Ali was the only candidate to obtain endorsements from 30 political figures, as required by the Constitution. As a result, he was unopposed for a full term.

In the Chamber of Deputies election, the Constitutional Democratic Rally (a renamed Socialist Destourian Party) won 80.6 percent of the vote and all 141 seats. According to official figures, voter turnout was 76.5% in the parliamentary election and 76.1% in the presidential election.

== Results ==
=== President ===
Candidate	Party	Votes	%
Zine El Abidine Ben Ali	Constitutional Democratic Rally	2,087,028	100.00
Total		2,087,028	100.00
Valid votes		2,087,028	99.27
Invalid/blank votes		15,348	0.73
Total votes		2,102,376	100.00
Registered voters/turnout		2,762,109	76.11
Source: Nohlen et al.

=== Chamber of Deputies ===
Although the elections were the closest Tunisia had come to a free election at the time, the results were heavily contested. Different sources offer ostensibly official figures that diverge significantly, particularly in respect to the share of votes received by the Ennahda Movement. Without official recognition as a party, the party fielded independent candidates that received between 10% and 17% of the vote nationally according to different "official" results quoted by different academics.

Party	Votes	%	Seats	+/–
Constitutional Democratic Rally	1,633,004	80.57	141	+16
Movement of Socialist Democrats	76,520	3.78	0	New
Popular Unity Party	13,956	0.69	0	New
Unionist Democratic Union	7,912	0.39	0	New
Leftist Coalition	7,619	0.38	0	New
Social Party for Progress	5,270	0.26	0	New
Socialist Progressive Rally	4,054	0.20	0	New
IRSP	1,224	0.06	0	New
Independents	277,155	13.68	0	0
Total	2,026,714	100.00	141	+16
Valid votes	2,026,714	98.45		
Invalid/blank votes	31,836	1.55		
Total votes	2,058,550	100.00		
Registered voters/turnout	2,711,925	75.91		
Source: Nohlen et al.

== Aftermath ==
Both the legal opposition and the Ennahda Movement accused the government of electoral fraud, with the Ennahda Movement claiming to have received between 60% and 80% of the vote. According to other analysts, the elections demonstrated the staying power of the state party RCD, which had expanded its membership in the run-up to the election to encompass nearly 40% of the registered electorate.
