= Tunisian coup d'état =

Tunisian coup d'état may refer to:

- 1987 Tunisian coup d'état
- 2021 Tunisian self-coup
