= History of modern Tunisia =

In its modern history, Tunisia is a sovereign republic, officially called the Republic of Tunisia. Tunisia has over ten million citizens, almost all of Arab-Berber descent. The Mediterranean Sea is to the north and east, Libya to the southeast, and Algeria to the west. Tunis is the capital and the largest city (over 800,000); it is located near the ancient site of the city of Carthage.

Its first modern leader, President Habib Bourguiba brought to the office hard-won political experience, after many decades of service in the leadership of the independence movement. As the major figure of the Neo-Destour Party, he was instrumental in obtaining full independence for Tunisia in 1956. He dominated the government until his removal in 1987. During his years in office, his accomplishments included: a law reform, economic policies which detoured briefly in a socialist direction, a moderate but steady improvement in standard of living, and a foreign policy which retained an independent approach while maintaining trade and economic connections to the west.

Ben Ali became President of the Republic in 1987, and kept power until he was forced to leave in 2011. His economic policies emphasized a market orientation. His attempt at reapproachment with Islamist groups did not meet expectations. The ruling party was reorganized. Under his leadership Tunisia's economy continued to perform at a pace which yielded a moderate but overall steady rate of growth.

A Constituent Assembly was elected following the overthrow of Ben Ali, which completed the task of drafting a new constitution and handed over to newly elected authorities in 2014, ushering in the Second Republic.

== Independence of the Kingdom of Tunisia ==
An independence movement lasting many decades eventually prevailed, leading to the end of the French protectorate (commenced in 1881). In 1954 the Tunisian struggle and consequent civil disturbances resulted in the start of negotiations for autonomy between France and the Neo Destour political party (essentially under Habib Bourguiba) supported by the Tunisian labor unions and by the Arab League. The agreed Convention of April, 1955, stated that France would retain control of the army and foreign affairs while granting autonomy, which was to begin the following year. Bourguiba was released from prison by the French to a tumultuous welcome. This compromise, however, split the Neo Destour; eventually it led to suppression of its left wing, and expulsion of its radical, pan-Arab leader Salah ben Youssef (or Yusuf), who later fled to Egypt. This resolution of intra-party strife signalled that Neo Destour would pursue a moderate path. The French then terminated their protectorate over Morocco, in order to concentrate their forces in Algeria. In reaction, and following the strong public opinion voiced by Tunisians, Bourguiba pressed for independence. The French, overcoming the heated objections of the French settlers, eventually acceded and protocols were drafted. On 20 March 1956, Tunisia achieved its full sovereignty. In July Tunisia's application for membership in the United Nations was accepted.

The French conceived an independent Tunisia as a constitutional monarchy ruled by the Bey of Tunis, Muhammad VIII al-Amin Bey (Lamine or Amin Bey). The Bey was an institution that dated back to the early Ottoman era. The prior Bey Muhammad VII al-Munsif (Moncef Bey) had been a popular nationalist, but Amin Bey was both considered by some to be compromised by the French, by others to be a youssefist. Already scheduled elections were held on 25 March 1956; due to secret arrangements negotiated by Bourguiba with the Bey the voters choose only party lists, not candidates. This arrangement made it easier for the Neo Destour party to keep out any youssefist or other dissidents, and to maintain party discipline. The elections were then swept by the Neo Destour party, whose leader Habib Bourguiba became prime minister. On 25 July 1957, the monarchy was abolished, the beylical office terminated, and Tunisia proclaimed a Republic. The assembly then made Bourguiba the first president, of what would be a single-party state.

== First Republic (1957–2014) ==
=== Era of Bourguiba ===
The Neo Destour regime sought to run a strictly structured regime with efficient and equitable state operations, but not with democratic-style politics. In effect, Bourguiba dominated the country for the next 31 years. He governed with programs yielding stability and economic progress, repressing Islamic fundamentalism, and establishing rights for women unmatched by any other Arab nation. The political culture would be secular, populist, and imbued with a kind of French rationalist vision of the state that was buoyant, touched with élan, even Napoleonic in spirit. Bourguiba then saw an idiosyncratic, eclectic future combining tradition and innovation, Islam with a liberal prosperity. Habib Bourguiba has been compared to Atatürk (Mustafa Kemal) of Turkey, as a unique national modernizing leader. Yet, what may be called an inclination to arbitrary methods when making government decisions, and to a kind of personality cult, detracted from Bourguiba's insight and substantial achievements.

"Bourguibism" was also resolutely nonmilitarist, arguing that Tunisia could never be a credible military power and that the building of a large military establishment would only consume scarce investment resources and perhaps thrust Tunisia into the cycles of military intervention in politics that had plagued the rest of the Middle East. In the name of economic development, Bourguiba nationalized various religious land holdings and dismantled several religious institutions. While surely a secularist, he did not appear anti-religious.

Bourguiba's great asset was that "Tunisia possessed a mature nationalist organization, the Neo Destour Party, which on independence day held the nation's confidence in hand." It had made its case to the city workers in the modern economy and to country folk in the traditional economy; it had excellent leaders who commanded respect and who generally developed reasonable government programs.

==== External and internal struggles ====
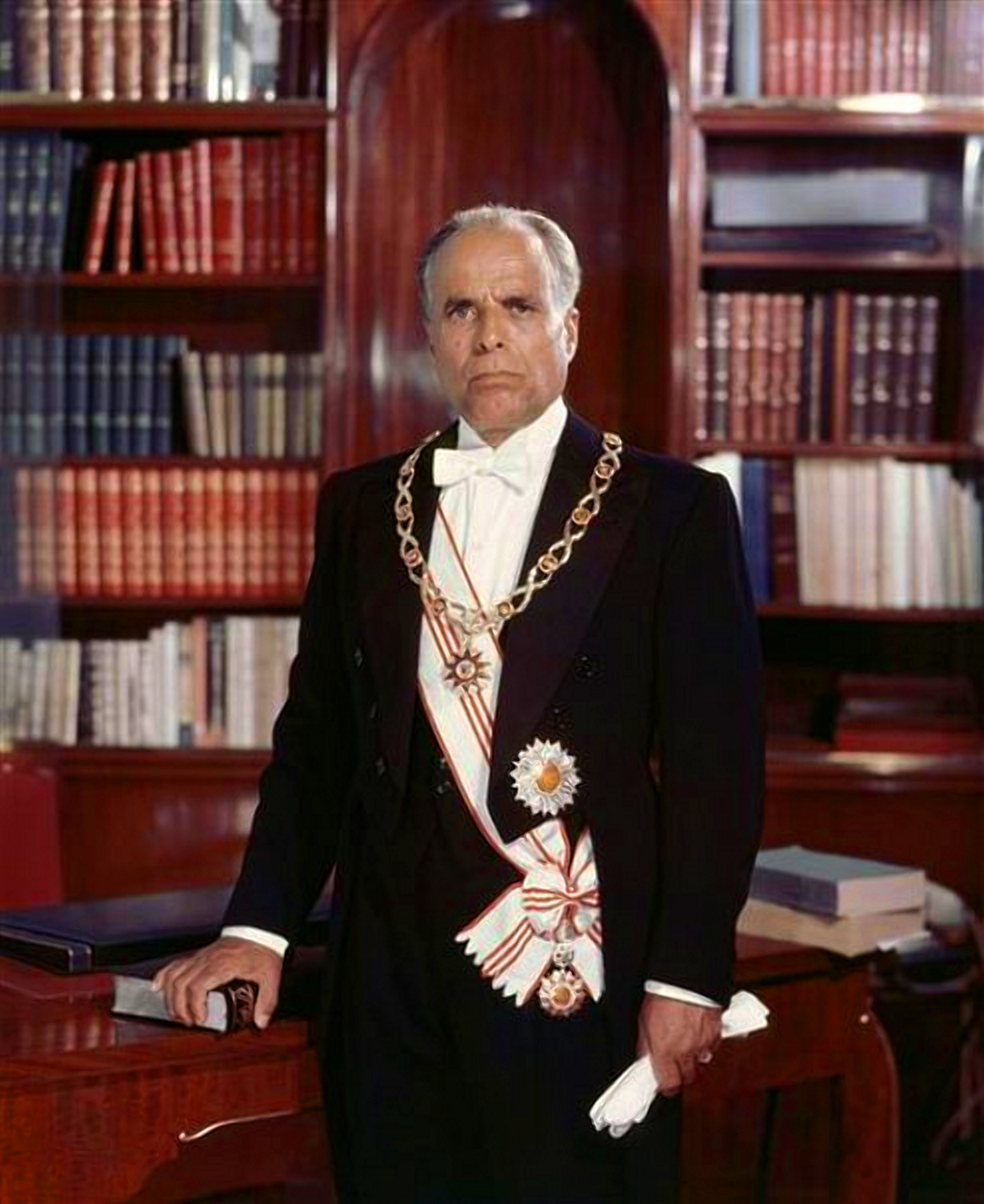
Habib Bourguiba, official photo as President of Tunisia.

In July 1961 when Tunisia imposed a blockade on the French naval base at Bizerte, hoping to force its evacuation the crisis culminated in a three-day battle between French and Tunisian forces that left 630 Tunisians and 24 French dead which eventually led to France ceding the city and naval base to Tunisia in 1963.

One serious rival to Habib Bourguiba was Salah Ben Youssef. Exiled in Cairo during the early 1950s he had absorbed the pan-Arab nationalism associated with the Egyptian leader Gamal Abdul Nasser. Yet as a result of his strong opposition to the Neo Destour leadership during their negotiations with France for autonomy prior to independence, Ben Youssef was removed from his position as secretary-general and expelled from the party. Nonetheless, he rallied disaffected union members, students, and others, enough to put 20,000 youssefists into the street during the next congress of the Neo Destour party. Eventually he left Tunisia for Cairo. This was the end of any meaningful opposition to Bourguiba. In 1963, the Neo-Destour Party was proclaimed to be the only legally permitted party, though for all intents and purposes Tunisia had been a one-party state since independence.

==== Economy ====
Socialism was not initially a major part of the Neo Destour project, but the government had always held and implemented redistributive policies. A large public works program was launched in 1961. Nonetheless, in 1964, Tunisia entered a short lived socialist era. The Neo Destour party became the Socialist Destour (Parti Socialiste Destourien or PSD), and the new minister of planning, Ahmed Ben Salah, formulated a state-led plan for agricultural cooperatives and public-sector industrialization. The socialist experiment raised considerable opposition within Bourguiba's old coalition. Ahmed Ben Salah was eventually dismissed in 1970, and many socialized operations (e.g., the farm cooperatives) were returned to private ownership in the early 1970s. In 1978, a general strike was repressed by the government with its forces killing dozens, and union leaders were jailed.

After independence, Tunisian economic policy had been primarily to promote light industry and tourism, and develop its phosphate deposits. The major sector remained agriculture with small farms prevailing, but these did not produce well. In the early 1960s the economy slowed down, but the socialist program did not prove to be the cure. In the 1970s the economy of Tunisia expanded at a very agreeable rate. Oil was discovered, and tourism continued. Foreign corporate investment increased. For example, Renault opened an auto manufacturing plant. City and countryside populations drew roughly equal in number. Yet agricultural problems and urban unemployment led to increased migration to Europe for work.

==== Politics in the 1980s ====
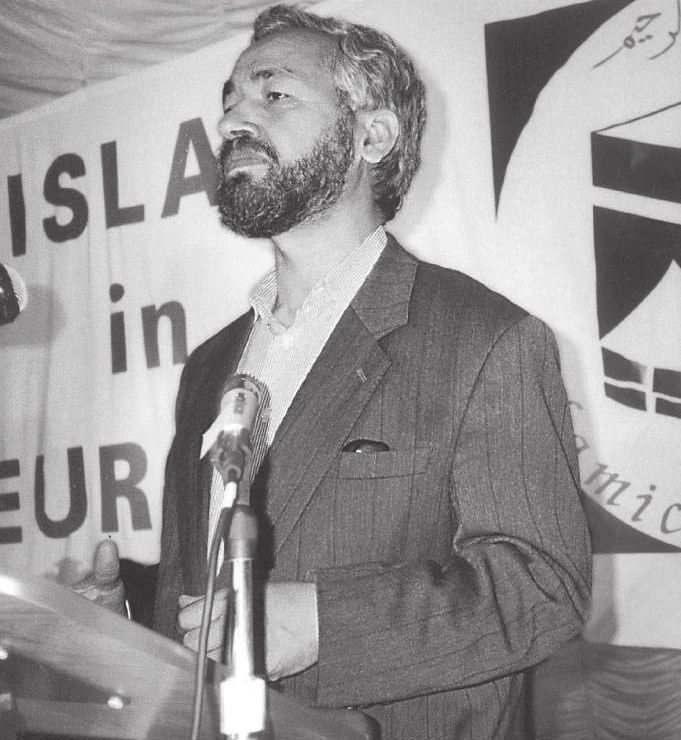
Rashid al-Ghannushi (around 1980)

In 1981 the government allowed a few "officially sanctioned" parties to run for office. But the economy faltered. Austerity imposed by the I.M.F. caused increases in the price of bread. During the Tunisian bread riots of December 1983 – January 1984 over 100 demonstrators were killed. The Islamic Tendency Movement (MTI) of Rashid al-Ghannushi came to the fore. Thousands were jailed, especially Islamists; critical newspapers were closed, disruptive trade unions disbanded. Security was headed by General Ben Ali. An ailing Bourguiba threatened severe repression.

Tunisia continued its close ties to the West, both economic and political. From 1979 to 1991 the Arab League was located in Tunis. The P.L.O. was also based in Tunis from 1982 to 1994. On 1 October 1985, in Operation Wooden Leg, Israeli Air Force F-15s bombed the PLO's Tunis headquarters, killing more than 60 people.

On the debit side, political democracy in the Western sense was more or less nonexistent. Even before Tunisia became a one-party state, it adopted a constitution vesting almost dictatorial powers in the presidency. Civil liberties were subject to "the limits prescribed by law," per the constitution. The media were expected to practice self-censorship, and opponents were frequently imprisoned. Bourguiba became the focus of a personality cult in which he was extolled as the "Supreme Warrior" of the nation. In 1975, Bourguiba was proclaimed president for life, though his health was increasingly poor. Although he was prevailed upon to legalize opposition parties in 1981, Tunisia remained for all intents and purposes a one-party state. The Destourian Socialist Party, in alliance with the trade unions, swept all of the seats in parliament. The opposition was disgusted; it boycotted the next elections, in 1986.

=== Era of Ben Ali ===
In the 1980s the economy performed poorly. In 1983 the International Monetary Fund (IMF) forced the government to raise the price of bread and semolina, causing severe hardship and protest riots. In this situation, the Islamic Tendency Movement (MTI) under Rashid al-Ghannushi provided popular leadership. Civil disturbances, including those by the Islamists, were repressed by government security forces under General Zine El Abidine Ben Ali. The government persisted in following its program; Ben Ali was named prime minister.

==== Rise to the Presidency ====
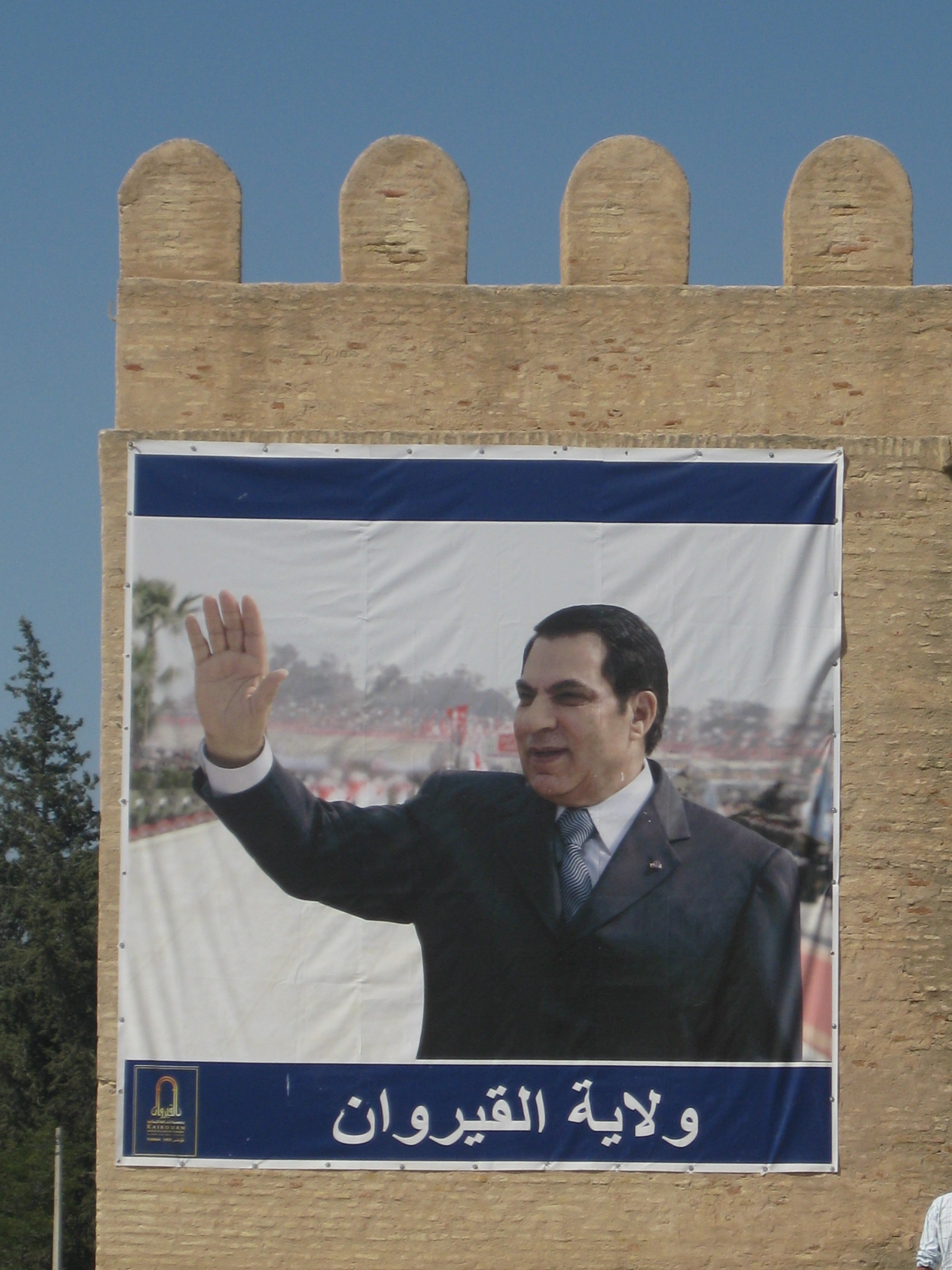
A banner welcoming Ben Ali to Kairouan in 2009

Ben Ali ascended to the office of President on 7 November 1987, after attending physicians to the former president filed an official medical report declaring Habib Bourguiba medically incapacitated and unable to fulfill the duties of the presidency. Two of the names given to Ben Ali's rise to the presidency include "the medical coup d'état" and the "Jasmine Revolution". In conformity with Article 57 of the Tunisian Constitution, Ben Ali became acting president pending elections in 1989. The country had faced 10% inflation, external debt accounting for 46% of GDP and a debt service ratio of 21% of GDP, in addition to a bombing campaign and attempted government overthrow, for which 76 members of the radical “Islamic Tendency Movement” were convicted in 1987.

In 1999 Fulvio Martini, former head of Italian military secret service SISMI, declared to a parliamentary committee that "In 1985–1987 we organized a kind of coup in Tunisia, putting president Ben Ali as head of state, replacing Burghiba (sic) who wanted to flee". Bourguiba, although a symbol of anticolonial resistance, was considered not capable to lead his country anymore, and his reaction to the raising Islamic integralism was deemed "a bit too energetic" by Martini: Bourguiba's threat to execute the suspects might have had strong negative implications in the neighbouring countries. Acting under directives of Bettino Craxi, Italian prime minister, and Giulio Andreotti, foreign minister, Martini claims to have brokered the accord that lead to the peaceful transition of powers.

Bettino Craxi had visited Algeria in November 1984, being warned by the president Chadli Benjedid that Algeria was ready to invade that region of Tunisia that was crossed by the pipeline towards Italy, if Bourguiba wasn't able to guarantee the stability of his own country. Algeria was trying to diversify its foreign policy, feeling isolated by Spain and by Mitterrand's accord with Morocco and Libya over Chad. For two years, according to Martini, Italian and Algerians secret services worked together in order, on one hand, to avoid that the growing destabilization of Tunisia might spillover in Algeria, and on the other hand to control pro-Palestinian terrorist activities in Italy. Finally, Ben Ali was singled out as possible replacement for Bourguiba: as chief of the Tunisian secret services and as Minister of Interiors, he had opposed plans for rough justice execution of fundamentalists. SISMI's action did not have the consent of René Imbot, head of the French secret service, and the United States were not informed.

According to Martini, the SISMI didn't have an operational role in Ben Ali's raise to power, but organized a political move to support politically and economically his new government, avoiding that Tunisia might fell in an open confrontation with fundamentalists as would be in Algeria in the following years.

In 1994, following the Tangentopoli scandal and the Mani Pulite inquiry, Bettino Craxi fled from Italy to Hammamet in Tunisia, and remained a fugitive there, protected by Ben Ali's government. He repeatedly declared himself innocent, but never returned to Italy where he had been sentenced to 27 years in jail because of his corruption crimes (of these, 9 years and 8 months were upheld on appeal). He died on 19 January 2000, at the age of 65, from complications of diabetes.

==== Liberalisation, then repression ====
Ben Ali initially took some steps to liberalise the regime. He dismantled the personality cult surrounding his predecessor. He also amended the constitution to limit the president to a total of three five-year terms, with no more than two in a row. In 1988, several Islamist activists were released from prison. He also forged a national pact with the Tunisian party Harakat al-Ittijah al-Islami (Islamic Tendency Movement), which had been founded in 1981; later it changed its name to Ennahda (the Renaissance Party). He also changed the ruling party's name to the Democratic Constitutional Rally.

However, Ben Ali's innovative tack did not work out well. Subsequently, An-Nahda claimed to have run strongly in the 1989 elections, giving it the appearance of being unfair; official results gave the RCD every seat in the legislature. Ben Ali subsequently banned Islamist political parties and reportedly jailed as many as 8,000 activists. At the same time, Ben Ali ran unopposed in Tunisia's first presidential election since 1972. At the time, prospective presidential candidates had to get the endorsements of 30 political figures. Given the RCD's near-total domination of politics, opposition candidates found it impossible to get their nomination papers signed.

The 1989 crackdown led to the restoration of some Bourguiba-era restrictions. Increasingly, self-censorship gave way to official censorship. Ben Ali was reelected unopposed in 1994. After amending the constitution to allow a president to run for three consecutive terms, Ben Ali was reelected in 1999, 2004 and 2009—each time by implausibly high margins (never falling below 89 percent of the vote) While the requirement to get signatures from 30 political figures had been lifted, opposition figures still faced nearly insurmountable obstacles.

By the dawn of the 21st century, Ben Ali was reckoned as leading one of the most repressive regimes in the world. His regime consistently gained poor ratings from human rights and press freedom agencies.

==== Economic reforms ====
As president, Ben Ali championed economic reforms that strengthened Tunisia's economy and increased foreign investment. After he ascended to the office of President, Tunisia's per capita GDP more than tripled from $1,201 in 1986 to $3,786 in 2008. Although, growth in 2002 slowed to a 15-year low of 1.9% due to drought and lackluster tourism, better conditions after 2003 helped push growth to about 5% of GDP. For about 20 years after 1987, the GDP annual growth averaged nearly 5%. A report published in July 2010 by the Boston Consulting Group ("The African Challengers: Global Competitors Emerge from the Overlooked Continent") listed Tunisia as one of the African "Lions" and indicated that the eight African lions account for 70 percent of the continent's gross domestic product.

Stable increases in GDP growth continued through positive trade relations with the European Union, a revitalized tourism industry and sustained agricultural production. Privatization, increasing foreign investment, improvements in government efficiency and reduction of the trade deficit remained challenges however. The 2010-2011 Global Competitiveness Report (Davos World Economic Forum) ranked Tunisia first in Africa and 32nd globally out of 139 countries.

However, Tunisia continued to suffer from a high unemployment, especially among youth. Left out of the relative prosperity were many rural and urban poor, including small businesses facing the world market. This was the cause of mass protests in December 2010-January 2011 - the worst unrest the country had faced for at least a decade.

==== Diplomacy ====
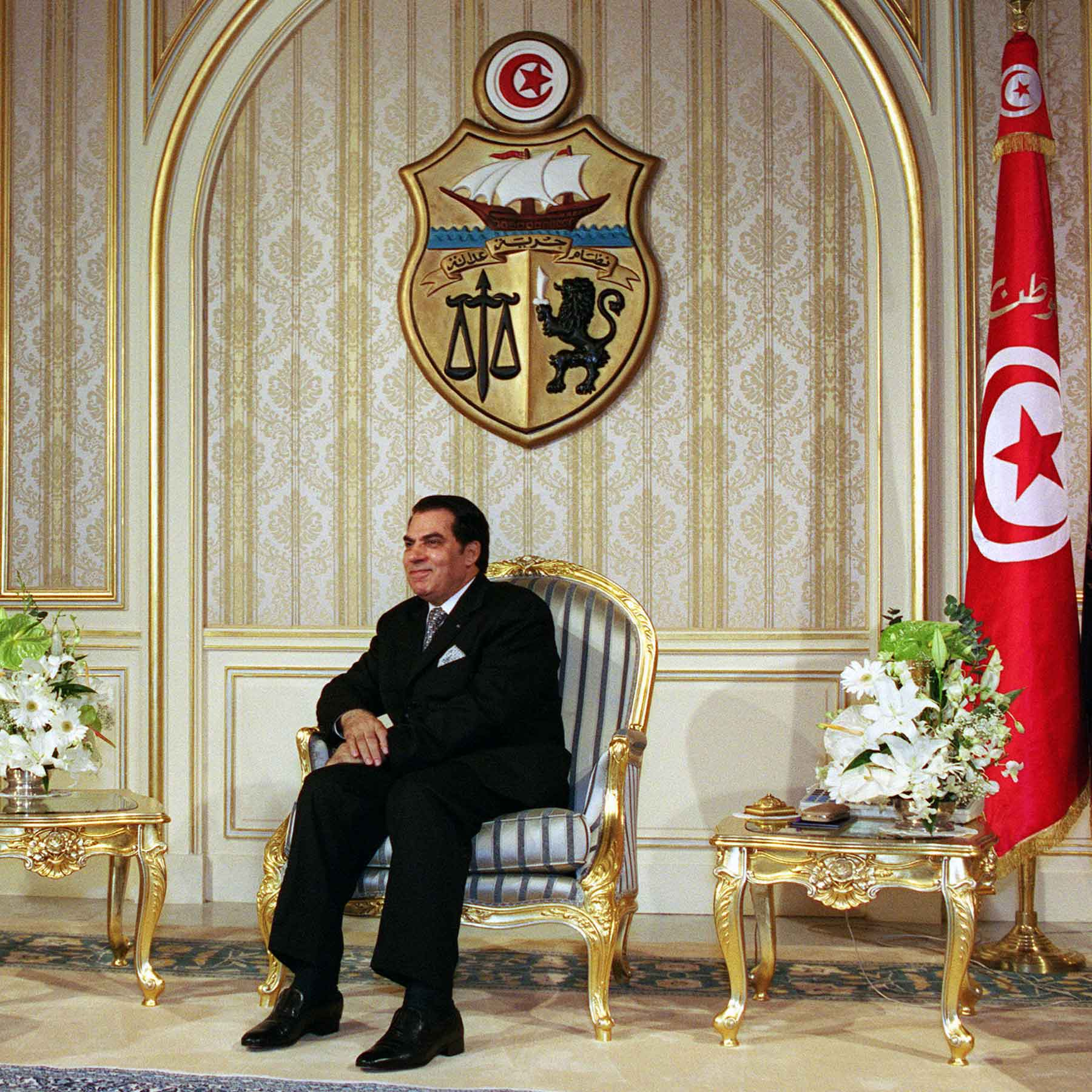
Ben Ali during a meeting with US Secretary of Defense William S. Cohen

During Ben Ali's presidency, Tunisia pursued a moderate foreign policy promoting peaceful settlement of conflicts. Tunisia took a middle of the road approach contributing to peacemaking especially in the Middle East and Africa. Tunisia hosted the first-ever Palestinian American dialogue. While contributing actively to the Middle East peace process, Tunisian diplomacy supported the Palestinian cause. As host to the Palestine Liberation Organization from 1982 to 1993, considerable efforts were made to moderate the views of the organization. Tunisia has, since the early 1990s, called for a "concerted" international effort against terrorism. It has also been a key US partner in the effort to fight global terrorism through the Trans-Sahara Counter-Terrorism Initiative.

President Ben Ali mostly retained his predecessor's pro-western foreign policy, though he improved ties with the Arab-Moslem world. He took several initiatives to promote solidarity, dialogue and cooperation among nations, initiating the United Nations World Solidarity Fund to eradicate poverty and promote social development based on the successful experience of the Tunisian National Solidarity Fund. Ben Ali also played a lead role in the UN's proclaiming 2010 as the International Year of Youth.

==== Loss of power ====
Starting in December 2010, Tunisian citizens began mass protesting against unemployment and Ben Ali's corruption. As mass protests grew, Ben Ali declared a state of emergency in the country, dissolved the government on 14 January 2011 and promised new legislative elections within six months. Later on that same day Prime Minister Mohammed Ghannouchi went on state television to say he was assuming power in Tunisia and said that the President had left the country. Ben Ali fled the country on 14 January at 4:00 pm local time on a flight bound for Dubai and arrived in Saudi Arabia early on Saturday 15 January, where he was welcomed by Saudi authorities. The protests became known as the Tunisian Revolution.

== Second Republic (2014–present) ==
Marzouki was defeated by Beji Caid Essebsi in the November–December 2014 presidential election, and Essebsi was sworn in as president on 31 December 2014, succeeding Marzouki.

Tunisia's first democratically elected president Beji Caid Essebsi died in July 2019. After him Kais Saied became Tunisia's president after a landslide victory in the 2019 Tunisian presidential election in October 2019. He had reputation of not being corruptible. On 23 October 2019, Kais Saied was sworn in as Tunisian president. In July 2022, Tunisians approved a new constitution in a referendum. The reform gave more powers to Tunisia's president, meaning the role of President Kais Saied strengthened significantly. On 6 October 2024, President Kais Saied won a second term with more than 90% of the vote in Tunisian presidential election. Five political parties had urged people to boycott the elections.

== See also ==
- History of medieval Tunisia
- Hafsid
- History of Ottoman era Tunisia
- Barbary Coast
- List of Beys of Tunis
- Tunisian Italians
- French conquest of Tunisia
- Tunisian Campaign
- Tunisia
- History of Tunisia
- History of Africa
