= Arab federation =

Arab federation may refer to:

- Arab Federation, a confederation between the Kingdom of Iraq and Jordan (1958)
- Arab League, a regional organization of Arab States in the Middle East and North Africa.
- Federation of Arab Republics, a federation between Libya, Egypt and Syria (1972-1977)
- United Arab Republic, a federation between Egypt and Syria (1958-61)
- United Arab States, a confederation between the Egypt, Syria and North Yemen (1958-61)
- Arab Islamic Republic, a proposed union of Libya and Tunisia (1974)
- United Arab Emirates, a union of seven Arab states (1971-present day)

== See also ==
- Federation of South Arabia, British protectorate (excluding Aden) which became independent as South Yemen (1962–1967)
- Federation of Arab Emirates of the South, preceding the Federation of South Arabia (1959–1962)
