= Elections in Tunisia =

Following the 2011 Tunisian revolution, elections in Tunisia for the president and the unicameral Assembly of the Representatives of the People are scheduled to be held every five years. The assembly can be dissolved before finishing a full term.

Prior to the revolution, elections were held every five to six years, and elected both the president and members of both legislative branches. Following the revolution, elections were held for a Constituent Assembly to decide on a new constitution for Tunisia.

From 1956 to 2011, the government and the Constitutional Democratic Rally—originally known as the Neo Destour (1934–1964) and the Socialist Destourian Party (1964–1988)—were effectively one. Although Tunisia was only formally a one-party state from 1963 to 1981, the opposition was usually barely tolerated. With the revolution, several parties have emerged. While there are two numerically major parties—Nidaa Tounes and the Ennahda Movement—no one party has a realistic chance of governing alone.

== Result ==
=== Presidential election of 2019 ===
Candidate	Party	First round		Second round	
Candidate	Party	Votes	%	Votes	%
Kais Saied	Independent	620,711	18.40	2,777,931	72.71
Nabil Karoui	Heart of Tunisia	525,517	15.58	1,042,894	27.29
Abdelfattah Mourou	Ennahda Movement	434,530	12.88		
Abdelkrim Zbidi	Independent	361,864	10.73		
Youssef Chahed	Long Live Tunisia	249,049	7.38		
Safi Saïd	Independent	239,951	7.11		
Lotfi Mraïhi	Republican People's Union	221,190	6.56		
Seifeddine Makhlouf	Dignity Coalition	147,351	4.37		
Abir Moussi	Free Destourian Party	135,461	4.02		
Mohamed Abbou (Tunisian politician)	Democratic Current	122,287	3.63		
Moncef Marzouki	Movement Party (Tunisia)	100,338	2.97		
Mehdi Jomaa	Tunisian Alternative	61,371	1.82		
Mongi Rahoui	Popular Front (Tunisia)	27,355	0.81		
Hechmi Hamdi	Current of Love	25,284	0.75		
Hamma Hammami	Independent	23,252	0.69		
Elyes Fakhfakh	Democratic Forum for Labour and Liberties	11,532	0.34		
Saïd Aïdi	Beni Watani	10,198	0.30		
Omar Mansour	Independent	10,160	0.30		
Mohsen Marzouk	Machrouu Tounes	7,376	0.22		
Hamadi Jebali	Independent	7,364	0.22		
Néji Jalloul	Independent	7,166	0.21		
Abid Briki	Tunisia Forward	5,799	0.17		
Selma Elloumi Rekik	Al Amal (political party)	5,093	0.15		
Mohamed Esghaier Nouri	Independent	4,598	0.14		
Slim Riahi	New National Union	4,472	0.13		
Hatem Boulabiar	Independent	3,704	0.11		
Total		3,372,973	100.00	3,820,825	100.00

=== Parliamentary election ===
Party	First round			Second round			Total seats
Party	Votes	%	Seats	Votes	%	Seats	Total seats
Independents	956,016	100.00	23	849,104	100.00	131	154
Vacant							7
Total	956,016	100.00	23	849,104	100.00	131	161

== Presidential elections ==
The president of Tunisia is directly elected by universal suffrage for a 5-year term. The president is elected by majority, with a second round with the top-two finishers if no candidate gets more than 50% of the vote in the first round. The first direct presidential election after the revolution was held in 2014. A person can not serve more than two terms as president, whether consecutive or not.

=== Pre-revolution ===
Prior to the revolution, the president was elected for five years. He appointed a prime minister and cabinet, who play a strong role in the execution of policy. Regional governors and local administrators are appointed by the central government. Mayors and municipal councils, which fill a local consultative role, are elected. This system was established by a provision of the country's Code of Personal Status, introduced by the former president Habib Bourguiba in 1956. Until 1999, prospective candidates were required to get the endorsements of at least 30 political figures.

From 1956 to 1975, the president could run for reelection any number of times. In 1975—a year after winning his fourth term—Bourguiba was declared president for life. With Bourguiba's ouster in 1987, his successor, Zine El Abidine Ben Ali, pushed through amendments limiting a president to three five-year terms, with no more than two in a row. The maximum age for presidential candidates was set at 70. However, in 2002, a referendum abolished term limits for the presidency, and raised the maximum age to 75.

== Parliamentary elections ==
Tunisia's legislative branch consists of the Assembly of the Representatives of the People, which consists of 217 seats. The first elections for the Assembly of the Representative of the People occurred on 26 October 2014.

=== Electoral System ===
The assembly is directly elected by the people using party-list proportional representation, with the individual seats distributed between lists in a constituency using largest remainder method. The lists are closed, a voter can only choose between lists, and not individual candidates. The lists are required to alternate between men and women. The assembly is elected for a 5-year term, but can be dissolved earlier by the president following a failure to form a government, or a failed confidence vote.

=== Distribution of seats ===
Constituencies are based on the governorates of Tunisia. Each governorate is allocated one seat for every 60000 inhabitants, with one more seat if the remaining number of inhabitants exceed 30000. Additionally, governorates with less than 270000 inhabitants are granted two extra seats, while governorates with between 270000 and 500000 inhabitants granted one extra seat. A constituency can have a maximum of 10 seats, if a governorate is entitled to more than 10 seats, it will be divided into two or more constituencies. Additionally, there are a number of constituencies representing Tunisians abroad.

For the 2011 and 2014 elections there were a total of 33 constituencies. There were 27 multi-member constituencies in Tunisia varying in size from four to ten seats and electing a total of 199. There are also six overseas constituencies electing a total of 18 seats: two constituencies in France electing five seats each, one three-seat constituency in Italy, a single-member constituency in Germany, a two-member constituency covering the rest of Europe and the Americas, and a two-member constituency covering the Arab world and the rest of the world.

=== Pre-revolution ===
The Chamber of Deputies of Tunisia (Majlis al-Nuwaab) was Tunisia's lower Chamber. It had 189 seats and members were elected by popular vote to serve five-year terms. 20% of the seats were reserved for the opposition. The Chamber played a role in debate on national policy but never originated legislation. Elections were held in the last 30 days of each five-year term. To be eligible for office, one had to be a voter with a Tunisian mother or father and be at least 23 years.

Tunisia's upper chamber, the Chamber of Advisors, was created in July 2002 by Parliament. Its membership was restricted to two-thirds of the number of members in the Chamber of Deputies. Members were elected or appointed. One or two members (determined by size of population) were elected from each governance. These members were selected by local authorities. A third of the members were elected by a group of employers, farmers and workers. These seats were divided equally among the three groups. The remaining seats (41) were filled by qualified presidential appointees. All members sat for six-year terms and half of the membership was renewed every three years. To be eligible for office, a candidate had to be a voter with a Tunisian mother or father and at least 40 years old.

Post-revolution:

The electoral and transition process did not progress without concessions and compromise. The full breadth of post-revolutionary political costs are discussed in The Great Tunisian Compromise.

== See also ==
- Electoral calendar
- Electoral system
