= 1974 Tunisian general election =

- 3 November 1974
- Presidential election
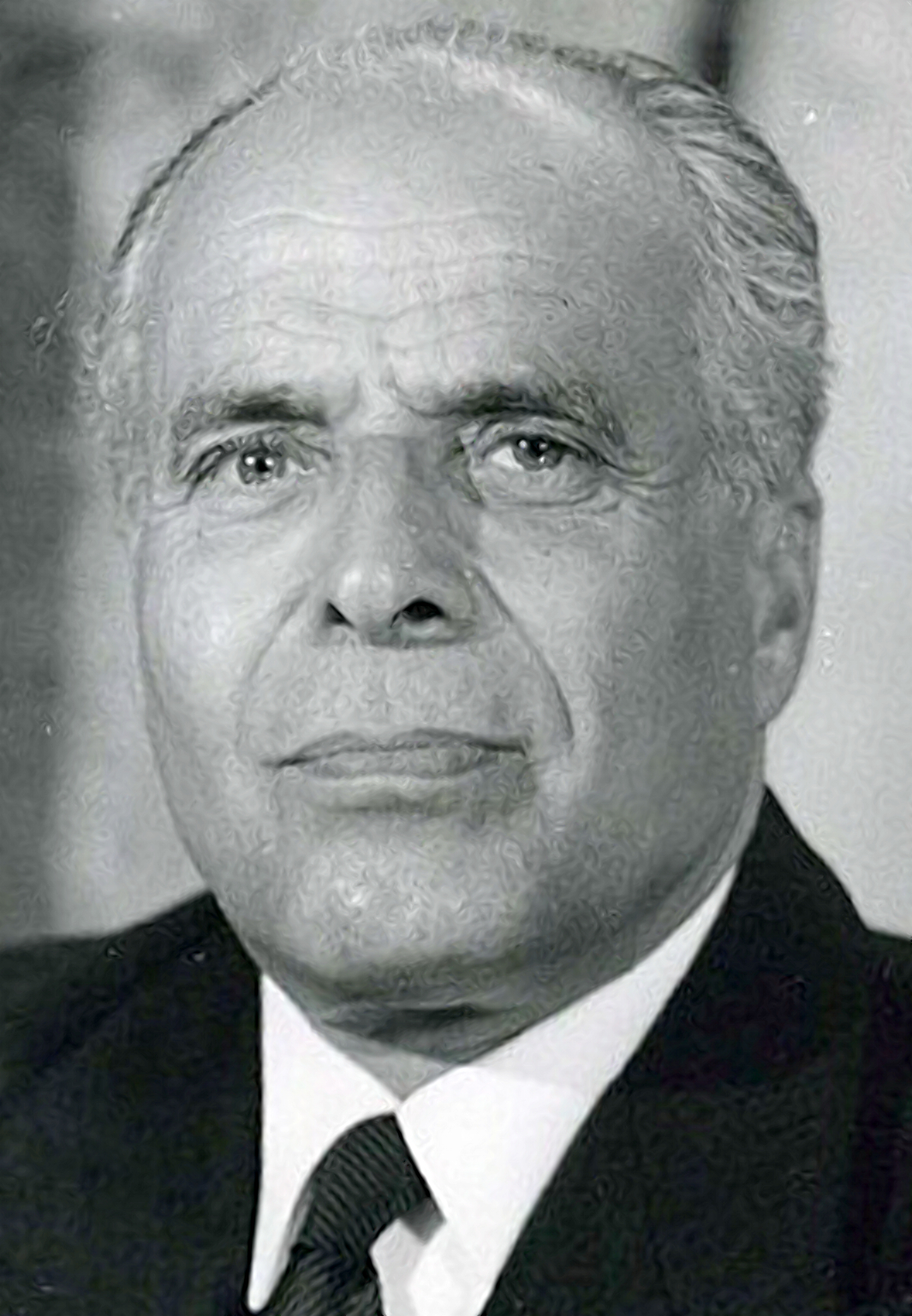
Nominee	Habib Bourguiba
Party	PSD
Popular vote	1,570,954
Percentage	100%
President before election
Habib Bourguiba
PSD
Elected President
Habib Bourguiba
PSD

General elections were held in Tunisia on 3 November 1974 to elect a President and Chamber of Deputies. At the time the country was a one-party state with the Socialist Destourian Party (PSD) as the sole legal party. In the presidential election, Habib Bourguiba was the only candidate by virtue as his role as the chairman of the PSD. In the Chamber election, the PSD put forward a single list of candidates in each constituency. Voter turnout was 96.8% in the Chamber election.

In March 1975, four months after the election, the Chamber of Deputies voted to make Bourguiba president for life. As a result, there were no presidential elections until 1989, after Bourguiba's overthrow.

== Results ==
=== President ===
Candidate	Party	Votes	%
Habib Bourguiba	Socialist Destourian Party	1,570,954	100.00
Total		1,570,954	100.00
Valid votes		1,570,954	99.85
Invalid/blank votes		2,337	0.15
Total votes		1,573,291	100.00
Registered voters/turnout		1,623,743	96.89
Source: Nohlen et al.

=== Chamber of Deputies ===
Party	Votes	%	Seats	+/–
Socialist Destourian Party	1,570,954	100.00	112	+11
Total	1,570,954	100.00	112	+11
Valid votes	1,570,954	99.85		
Invalid/blank votes	2,337	0.15		
Total votes	1,573,291	100.00		
Registered voters/turnout	1,623,743	96.89		
Source: IPU, Nohlen et al.
