= 1986 Tunisian parliamentary election =

Parliamentary elections were held in Tunisia on 2 November 1986. The Socialist Destourian Party and the Tunisian General Labour Union, which had run in the previous election under the National Front banner, were joined in a Patriotic Union alliance by the employers', farmers' and women's unions. All opposition parties boycotted the election, and only 15 independents remained, although they also pulled out prior to election day.

As a result, the Patriotic Union won all 125 seats. Voter turnout was 82.94%.

== Results ==
Party	Votes	%	Seats	+/–
Patriotic Union (PSD–UGTT)			125	–11
Independents			0	0
Total			125	–11
Valid votes	2,165,057	99.54		
Invalid/blank votes	10,036	0.46		
Total votes	2,175,093	100.00		
Registered voters/turnout	2,622,482	82.94		
Source: Nohlen et al.
