= Chiraz Latiri =

Tunisian academic, director of cultural institutions, and politician (born 1972)

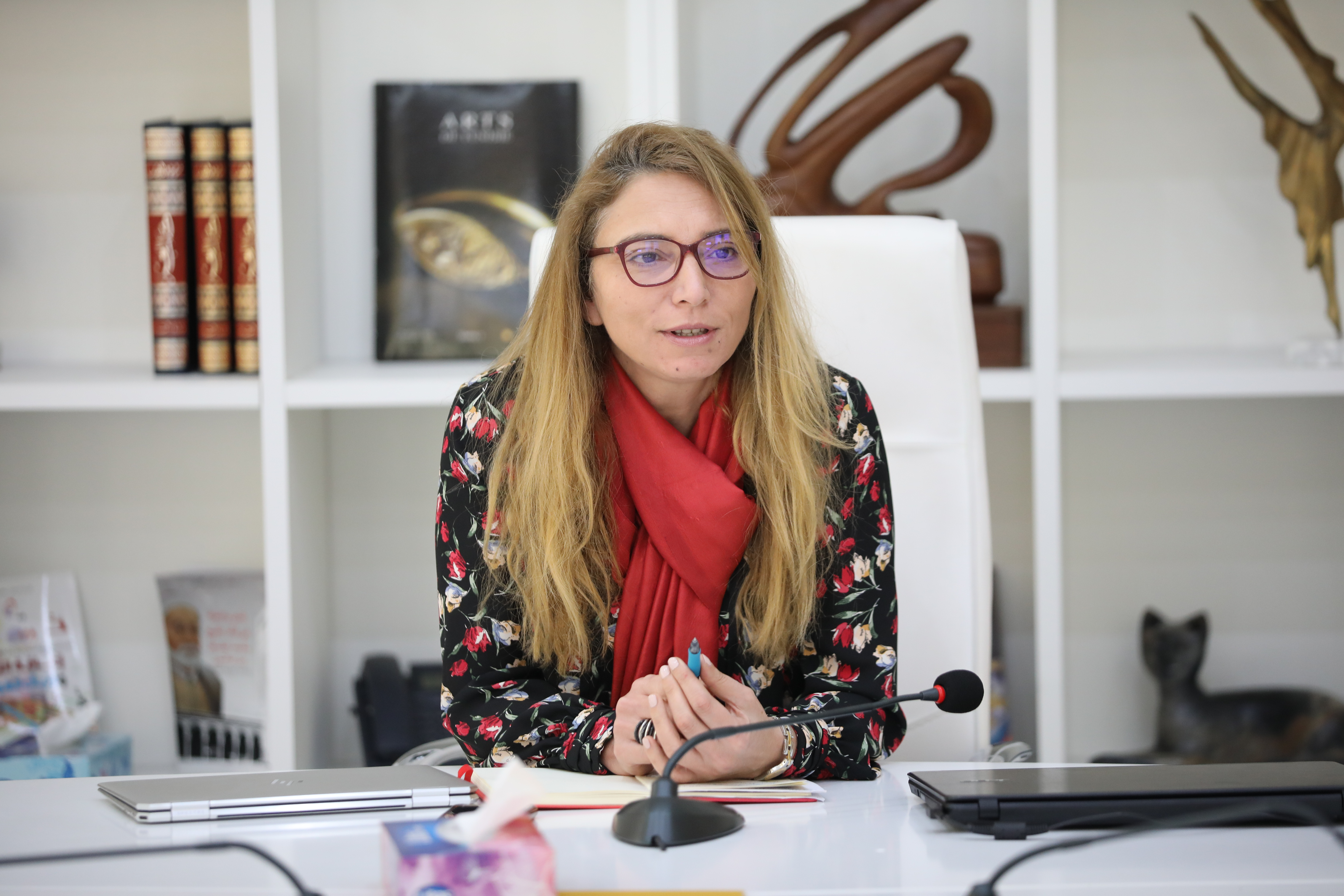
Chiraz Latiri (2020)

Chiraz Latiri Cherif (born 24 March 1972) is a Tunisian academic, cultural researcher, and politician. In 2006, she joined the staff of Manouba University where she specialised in cinema and multimedia. After heading the Tunisian Cinema and Image Centre (2017–2019), in February 2020 she was appointed Minister of Culture.

== Early life and education ==
Chiraz Latiri Cherif was born on 24 March 1972 in Hammam Sousse, Tunisia.

She completed her school education in 1989 with a baccalaureate from the Lycée de Garçons de Sousse, and went on to study at the Institut supérieur de gestion de Tunis (1990-1994), Tunis University (1995–1997), and at the Ecole Nationale des Sciences de l'Informatique, where she earned a doctorate in computer science in 2004.

She subsequently earned an HDR research diploma at the University of Lorraine in Lorraine, France, in 2013.

== Career ==
In 2006, Latiri was appointed director of ISAMM, the Manouba Higher Institute of Arts and Multimedia in Manouba, Tunisia. By implementing cooperation with France, she succeeded in developing training in film, virtual reality, and computer games.

From July 2017 to November 2019, she served as director-general at CNCI, the Tunisian Cinema and Image Centre, where she initiated a number of international film projects, including the Arab Film Platform. At CNCI, she also created a Creative Digital Lab, a Gaming Lab and the national programme Tunisia Games Factory.

In February 2020, Latiri was appointed Tunisian Minister of Culture in the government of Elyes Fakhfakh.

== Recognition and awards ==
In February 2020, the Arab Cinema Center and The Hollywood Reporter honoured Latiri with the Arab Cinema Personality of the Year award.
