= 1979 Tunisian parliamentary election =

Parliamentary elections were held in Tunisia on 4 November 1979, with a presidential election not required after Habib Bourguiba had been made President-for-life in 1975. At the time the country was a one-party state with the Socialist Destourian Party (PSD) as the sole legal party. Unlike previous elections, in which the PSD put forward a single list of candidates in each constituency, for this election there were multiple PSD candidates to choose from. Voter turnout was 80.55%.

== Results ==
Party	Votes	%	Seats	+/–
Socialist Destourian Party	1,560,753	100.00	121	+9
Total	1,560,753	100.00	121	+9
Valid votes	1,560,753	96.23		
Invalid/blank votes	61,222	3.77		
Total votes	1,621,975	100.00		
Registered voters/turnout	2,013,581	80.55		
Source: Nohlen et al.
