= Mohamed Masmoudi =

Tunisian politician (1925–2016)

Mohamed Masmoudi محمد المصمودي
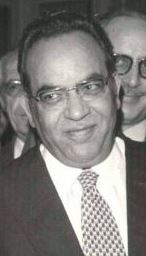
- Mohamed Masmoudi in the 1970s.

Minister of Foreign Affairs
- In office 12 June 1970 – 14 January 1974
- President: Habib Bourguiba
- Prime Minister: Bahi Ladgham; Hédi Nouira
- Preceded by: Habib Bourguiba Jr.
- Succeeded by: Habib Chatti

Minister of the Economy
- In office 7 September 1955 – 15 April 1956
- Monarch: Lamine Bey
- Succeeded by: Ferjani Bel Haj Ammar

Personal details
- Born: Mohamed Masmoudi; 29 May 1925 Mahdia, Tunisia
- Died: 7 November 2016 (aged 91) Mahdia, Tunisia
- Party: Neo Destour / Socialist Destourian Party

Mohamed Masmoudi (Arabic: محمد المصمودي) (29 May 1925, – 7 November 2016) was a Tunisian politician who was the Minister of Foreign Affairs from 12 June 1970 until 14 January 1974. He died on 7 November 2016, aged 91.
