= 1964 Tunisian general election =

- 8 November 1964
- Presidential election
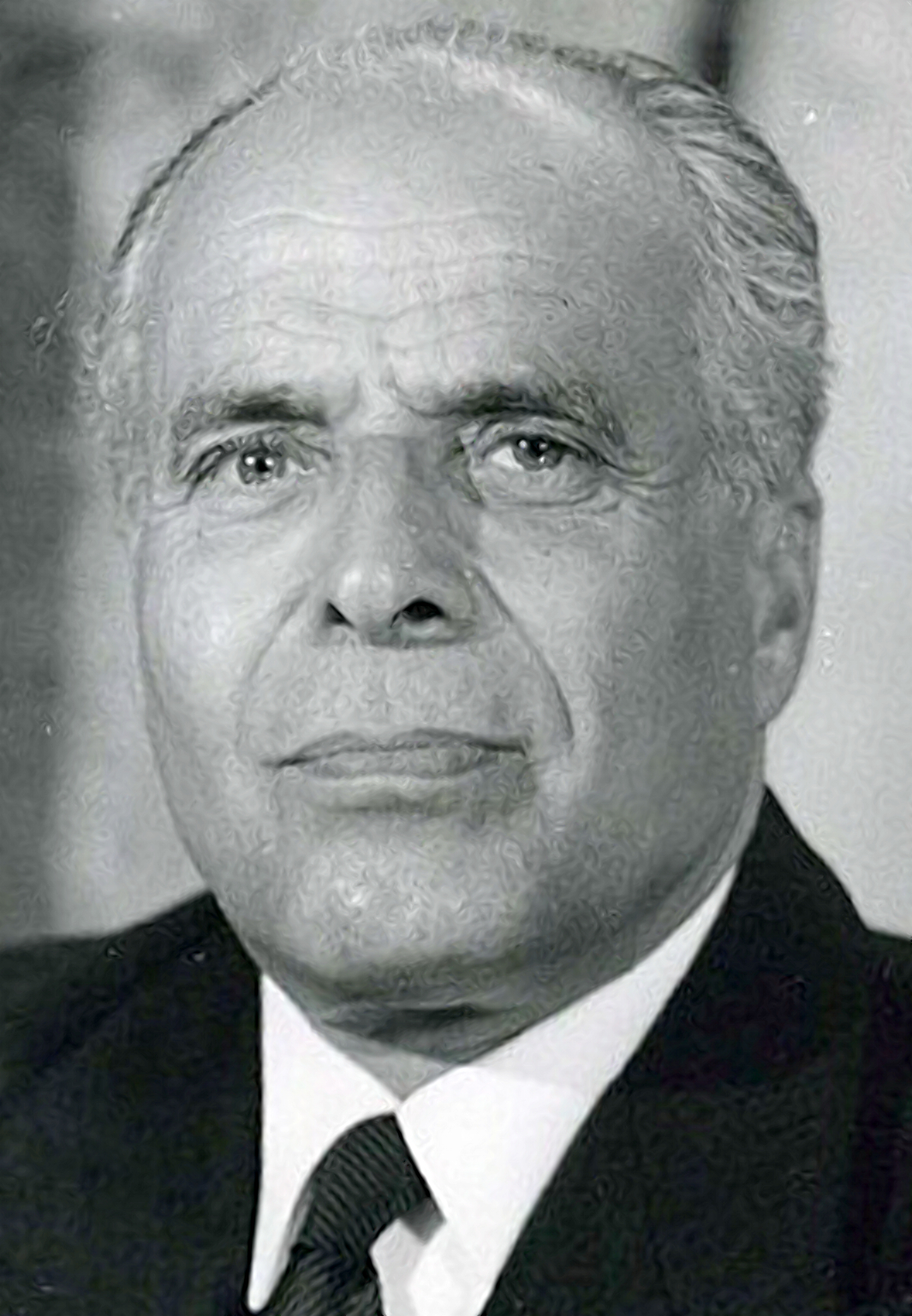
Nominee	Habib Bourguiba
Party	PSD
Popular vote	1,255,153
Percentage	100%
President before election
Habib Bourguiba
PSD
Elected President
Habib Bourguiba
PSD

General elections were held in Tunisia on 8 November 1964 to elect a President and Chamber of Deputies. A year earlier, the country had been formally declared a one-party state with the Socialist Destourian Party (PSD, formerly the Neo Destour) as the sole legal party. However, the country had effectively been a one-party state since independence in 1956.

In the presidential election, incumbent Habib Bourguiba was re-elected unopposed; as the chairman of the PSD, he was the only candidate for president. In the Chamber election, voters were presented with a single list from the PSD, which won all 101 seats. Voter turnout was 96.8%.

== Results ==
=== President ===
Candidate	Party	Votes	%
Habib Bourguiba	Socialist Destourian Party	1,255,153	100.00
Total		1,255,153	100.00
Valid votes		1,255,153	99.78
Invalid/blank votes		2,794	0.22
Total votes		1,257,947	100.00
Registered voters/turnout		1,301,534	96.65
Source: Nohlen et al.

=== Chamber of Deputies ===
Party	Votes	%	Seats
Socialist Destourian Party	1,255,153	100.00	101
Total	1,255,153	100.00	101
Valid votes	1,255,153	99.78	
Invalid/blank votes	2,794	0.22	
Total votes	1,257,947	100.00	
Registered voters/turnout	1,301,534	96.65	
Source: Nohlen et al.
