= 1987 Tunisian coup d'état =

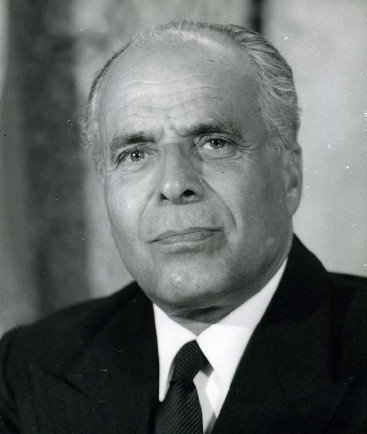
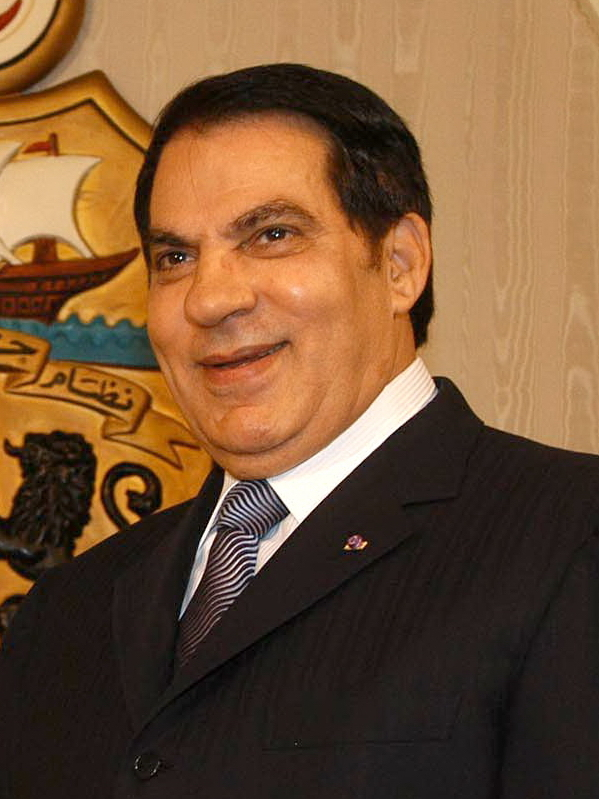
- Bourguiba Ben Ali
- Date: 7 November 1987
- Location: Tunis, Tunisia
- Caused by: Financial crisis; Political repression; Clientelism
- Result: Coup successful: Minimum disruption; President Habib Bourguiba removed from office; Prime Minister Zine El Abidine Ben Ali installed as President

Lead figures
Habib Bourguiba	(Tunisia) Zine El Abidine Ben Ali

The 1987 Tunisian coup d'état involved the bloodless ousting of the aging president of Tunisia Habib Bourguiba on 7 November 1987, and his replacement as president by his recently appointed prime minister, Zine El Abidine Ben Ali. The action was justified by reference to Bourguiba's failing health and Article 57 of the country's constitution. Reports later surfaced to indicate that the Italian intelligence services had been involved in planning it.

Sources sometimes identify the 1987 coup as the "Révolution de jasmin" (Jasmin Revolution) as the jasmine flower is considered a symbol of Tunisia. However, more recent sources also use the same term to identify the 2011 Tunisian Revolution.

== Events ==
During the night of 6 November 1987, a group of seven doctors signed a medical report attesting to the mental incapacity of Bourguiba. Political journalist Mezri Haddad summarised the report as follows:

Officially aged 84, (Note: There is uncertainty over Bourguiba's birth year. Certain families were careful not to declare a boy's early birth date in order to avoid conscription according to Samya El Mechat, La Tunisie et les chemins vers l'indépendance. 1945–1956, éd. L'Harmattan, Paris, 1992. He might have been in fact born in 1901 or even in 1898. Bourguiba himself said in 1955: "I was born in 1901. But when I applied to law school in Paris in 1924, the secretary made a mistake and marked 1903. Since I was not a very young student, I was satisfied with this date and I kept it". One of his ministers, Mahmoud El Materi, confirmed this hypothesis in a memoir.) Bourguiba fell asleep while receiving a foreign visitor. Influenced by those who coveted the presidency, the next day, he sacked a minister just one day after appointing him. He agreed to his prime minister's cabinet reshuffle only to retract his agreement a few hours later. Worst of all, he insisted on overturning a court verdict on Rached Ghannouchi, whom he viewed as an extremist ("I want fifty heads ... I want thirty heads ... I want Ghannouchi"). (Note: (in French) Officiellement âgé de 84 ans, Bourguiba s'endort quand il reçoit un hôte étranger; sous l'influence de ceux qui guignent la présidence, il chasse le lendemain le ministre qu'il a nommé la veille, il admet le remaniement ministériel proposé par son Premier ministre pour se rétracter quelques heures après ... Pire que tout, il exige la révision du procès de l'intégriste Rached Ghannouchi (et la condamnation à mort de ce dernier) : « Je veux cinquante têtes [...] Je veux trente têtes [...] Je veux Ghannouchi) (Note: Rached Ghannouchi is still alive (2016).)

At the same time, Bourguiba demanded new trials for 15 suspected Islamists, and that all but three of them be hanged by the following weekend. When this order became known, a number of Tunisian political leaders, including longtime supporters of Bourguiba, feared that Bourguiba was no longer acting or thinking rationally. Later, one human rights activist said that if the orders had been carried out, it would have triggered a civil war.

In justification of the coup, Prime Minister Ben Ali invoked Article 57 of the constitution, as he assumed power. He rapidly emerged, therefore, not merely as the constitutional president, but also as the commander in chief of the army. The journalists Nicolas Beau and Jean-Pierre Tuquoi summarise the circumstances under which the necessary medical opinion had been obtained:

Seven doctors, including two military doctors, were called together in the middle of the night, not to the sickbed of Bourguiba, but to the Interior Ministry. One of the seven was the president's doctor at the time, the cardiologist and military general Mohamed Gueddiche. At the ministry they found Ben Ali who told them to formulate a written opinion on the incapacity of the president. One of the doctors began to protest that he had not seen Bourguiba for two years. "That does not matter. Sign!", interjected General Ben Ali. (Note: (in French) Sept médecins dont deux militaires sont convoqués en pleine nuit, non pas au chevet du malade Bourguiba, mais au ministère de l'Intérieur. Parmi eux se trouve l'actuel médecin du président, le cardiologue et général Mohamed Gueddiche. Ben Ali somme les représentants de la faculté d'établir un avis médical d'incapacité du président. « Je n'ai pas vu Bourguiba depuis deux ans » proteste un des médecins. « Cela ne fait rien ! Signe ! » tranche le général Ben Ali.)

The next day the new president addressed the nation on Radio Tunis. He paid tribute to the huge sacrifices that his predecessor had made, supported by brave men, in his service to the liberation and development of Tunisia. At the same time Ben Ali took the opportunity to make a declaration: "In the times in which we live it is not longer enough to put up either with presidencies for life or with automatic succession for the head of state, under a system from which the people are excluded. Our people deserve a modern politics, based on a genuinely multi-party system incorporating a plurality of mass organisations." (Note: (in French) L'époque que nous vivons ne peut plus souffrir ni présidence à vie ni succession automatique à la tête de l'État desquelles le peuple se trouve exclu. Notre peuple est digne d'une vie politique évoluée et institutionnalisée, fondée réellement sur le multipartisme et la pluralité des organisations de masse.) The further justification was later given that fundamentalist movements were preparing a coup of their own, and had prepared a list of assassination targets in connection with their plans.

== Role of Italian intelligence ==
Fulvio Martini, a former head of the Italian Intelligence Service, gave an interview to the newspaper la Repubblica on 11 October 1997 in which he asserted that Italian Intelligence had played an important role in the removal of Bourgiba. "Everything began with the visit of the Italian Prime Minister Bettino Craxi to Algeria in 1984", he explained. "The Algerians were nervous about growing instability in Tunisia and were ready to intervene" because of the risks the situation presented to their own strategic interests. This meant that the Algerian army was ready to invade the part of Tunisia crossed by the natural-gas pipeline transporting Algerian gas to Sicily. Martini continued: "In 1985 Prime Minister Craxi asked me to go to Algeria and establish contact with the security services there ... in order to avert any sudden move by Algeria. That was the start of a lengthy foreign policy operation in which the security services played a central role. In the end the parties agreed that General Ben Ali would be better able to guarantee the stability of Tunisia than Bourguiba." Martini added: "We suggested this solution to the Algerians and they discussed it with the Libyans. I went to talk to the French [...but...] the French security chief at that time, René Imbot reacted with arrogance, and simply stated that we Italians should not become involved, because Tunisia was part of France's imperial legacy".

The priority was to organise a coup as invisible as possible, and this gave rise to the idea of a "medical coup". Italy would guarantee to support a Ben Ali takeover, and this choice was also approved by Libya and Algeria. "It is true that Italy replaced Bourguiba with Ben Ali" Martini agreed after 10 October 1999 when la Repubblica referred to a report that Martini had revealed before a parliamentary commission on 6 October 1999. On the other hand, Craxi disputed any involvement by the Italian Security Services. Speaking in 1999 to Agence France-Press in Tunis: "There was no Italian manoeuvring or interference in the events that carried President Ben Ali to power in 1987". The closeness of Craxi's own complicated and long standing relationship with the Tunisian political establishment led commentators to doubt his words, but the French journal Le Monde found no evidence against his version. Craxi remained a close friend of Ben Ali, and died, while being prosecuted by the Italian justice system for the Tangentopoli scandal, in Tunisia (2000).

== Aftermath ==
Ben Ali took control of the ruling Socialist Destourian Party, renamed it and transformed it into the Democratic Constitutional Rally. The promised elections took place in 1989 and were won by the new party. In principle, Ben Ali followed similar policies to Bourguiba, positioning himself as the spiritual successor to his superannuated predecessor. He remained in power for 23 years until 2011, when he was deposed in the Tunisian Revolution.
