= 1969 Tunisian general election =

- 2 November 1969
- Presidential election
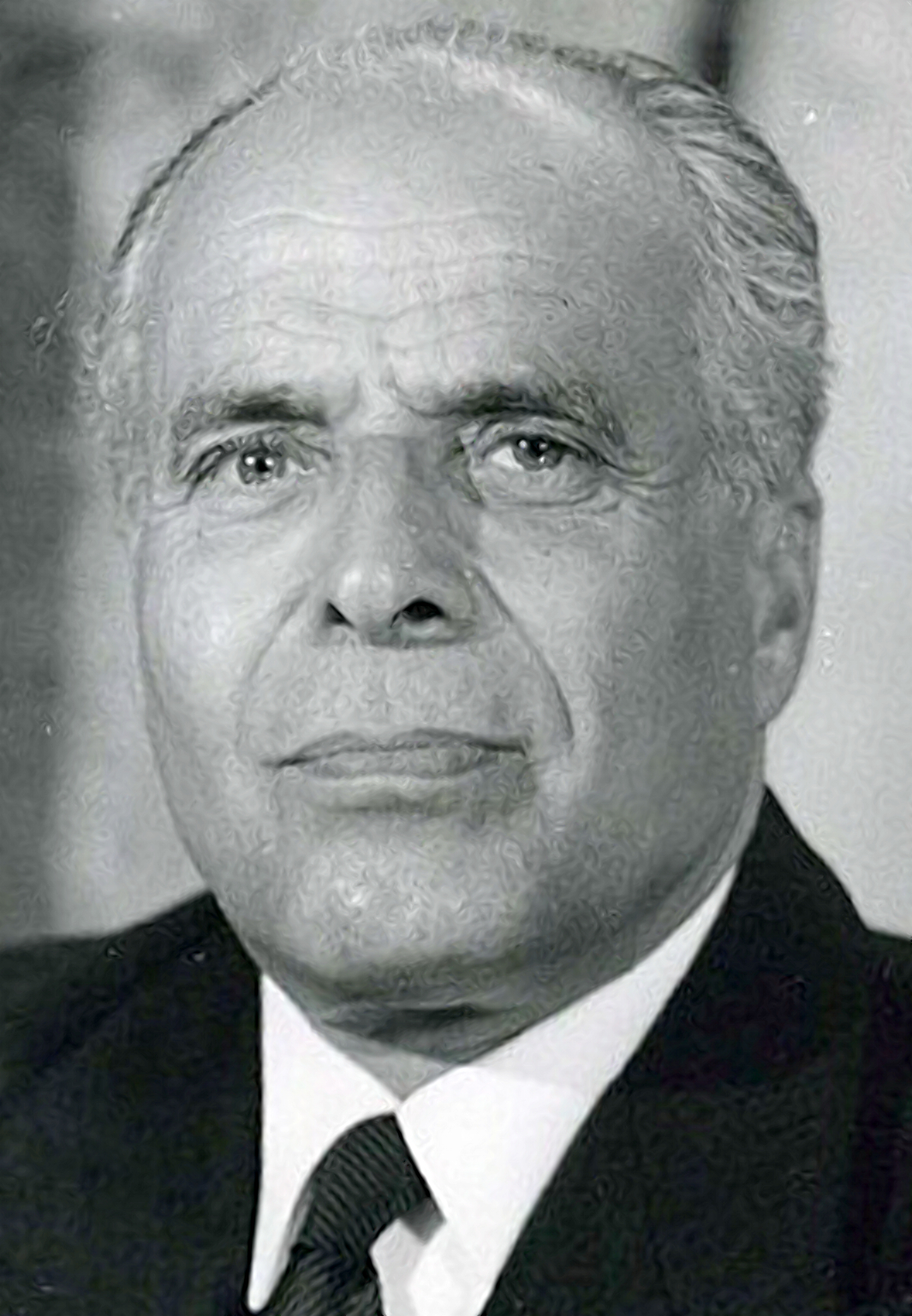
Nominee	Habib Bourguiba
Party	PSD
Popular vote	1,363,939
Percentage	100%
President before election
Habib Bourguiba
PSD
Elected President
Habib Bourguiba
PSD

General elections were held in Tunisia on 2 November 1969 to elect a President and Chamber of Deputies. At the time the country was a one-party state with the Socialist Destourian Party (PSD) as the sole legal party. In the presidential election, Habib Bourguiba was the only candidate by virtue of his role as the chairman of the PSD. In the Chamber election, the PSD put forward a single list of candidates in each constituency. Voter turnout was 99.8% in the presidential election and 94.7% in the Chamber election.

== Results ==
=== President ===
Candidate	Party	Votes	%
Habib Bourguiba	Socialist Destourian Party	1,363,939	100.00
Total		1,363,939	100.00
Valid votes		1,363,939	99.77
Invalid/blank votes		3,183	0.23
Total votes		1,367,122	100.00
Registered voters/turnout		1,443,347	94.72
Source: Nohlen et al.

=== Chamber of Deputies ===
Party	Votes	%	Seats	+/–
Socialist Destourian Party	1,363,939	100.00	101	0
Total	1,363,939	100.00	101	0
Valid votes	1,363,939	99.77		
Invalid/blank votes	3,183	0.23		
Total votes	1,367,122	100.00		
Registered voters/turnout	1,443,347	94.72		
Source: Nohlen et al.
