= 1959 Tunisian general election =

General election held in Tunisia

General elections were held in Tunisia on 8 November 1959 to elect a President and Chamber of Deputies, following the promulgation of a new constitution on 1 June. They were also the first elections held since the proclamation of a republic in 1957.

In the presidential election, incumbent Habib Bourguiba, who had become president upon the republic's proclamation, was the only candidate to obtain the endorsement of 30 political figures, as required by the constitution. He was thus unopposed for a full five-year term. In the parliamentary elections, Bourguiba's Neo Destour won all 90 seats in the Chamber of Deputies, with only the Tunisian Communist Party running against them in Tunis and Gafsa. Voter turnout was 91.7%.

This would be the last even nominally contested election held in Tunisia until 1981. In 1963, a year before the Chamber's term ran out, the Neo Destour was declared the only legally permitted party, though Tunisia had effectively been a one-party state since independence.

== Results ==
=== President ===
Candidate	Party	Votes	%
Habib Bourguiba	Neo Destour	1,005,769	100.00
Total		1,005,769	100.00
Valid votes		1,005,769	99.78
Invalid/blank votes		2,190	0.22
Total votes		1,007,959	100.00
Registered voters/turnout		1,099,577	91.67
Source: TIME, Nohlen et al.

=== Chamber of Deputies ===
Party	Votes	%	Seats
Neo Destour	1,002,298	99.65	90
Tunisian Communist Party	3,471	0.35	0
Total	1,005,769	100.00	90
Valid votes	1,005,769	99.78	
Invalid/blank votes	2,190	0.22	
Total votes	1,007,959	100.00	
Registered voters/turnout	1,099,577	91.67	
Source: Nohlen et al.
