= Hamed Karoui =

Tunisian politician (1927–2020)

- حامد القروي
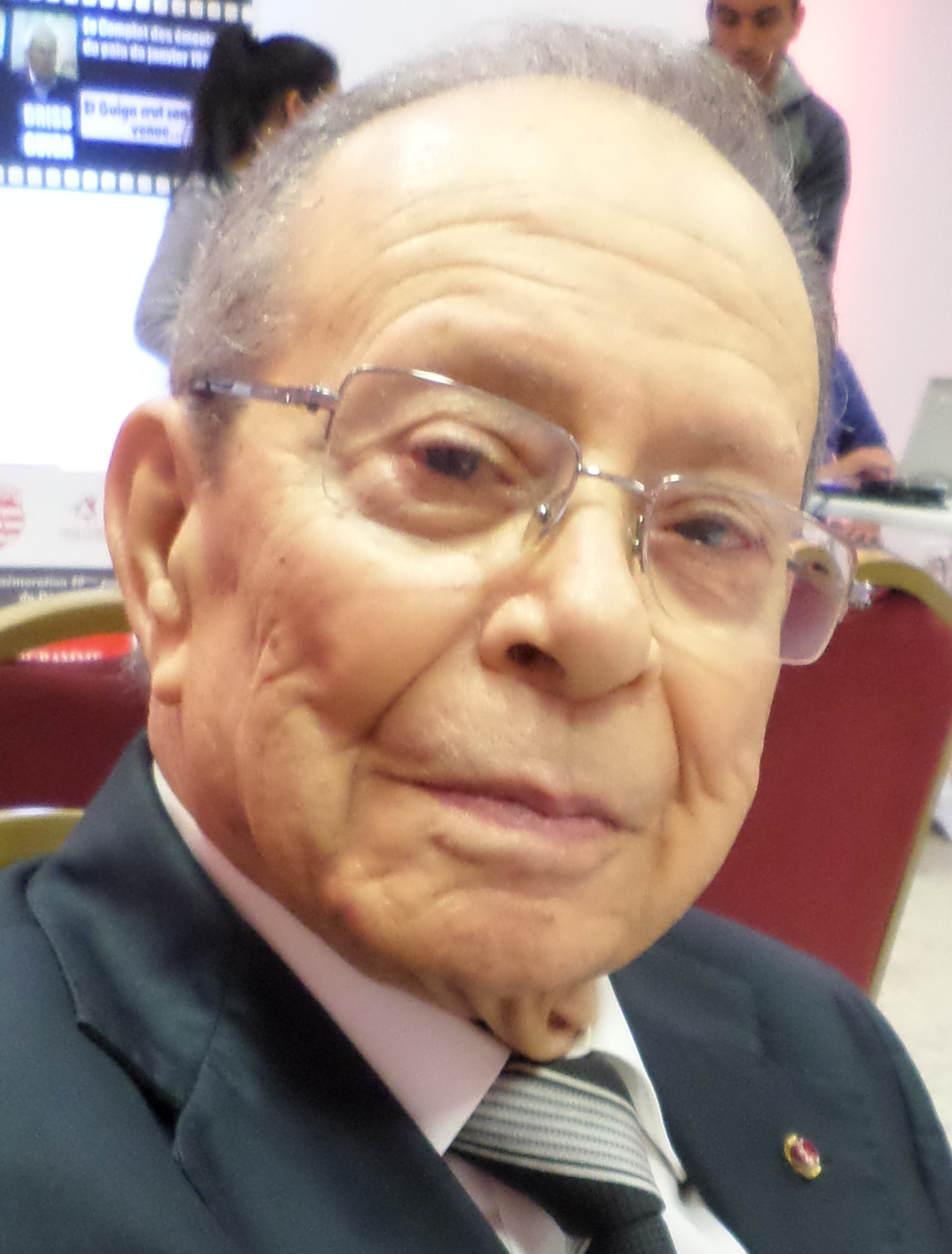
- Karoui in 2017

Prime Minister of Tunisia
- In office 27 September 1989 – 17 November 1999
- President: Zine El Abidine Ben Ali
- Preceded by: Hédi Baccouche
- Succeeded by: Mohamed Ghannouchi

Minister of Justice
- In office 24 July 1988 – 28 September 1989
- Prime Minister: Hédi Baccouche
- Preceded by: Mohamed Salah Ayari
- Succeeded by: Mustapha Bouaziz

Personal details
- Born: 30 December 1927 Sousse, French Tunisia
- Died: 27 March 2020 (aged 92) Sousse, Tunisia
- Party: Neo-Destour (1942–1964); Socialist Destourian Party (1964–1988); Constitutional Democratic Rally (1988–2011); Independent (2011–2013); Free Destourian Party (2013–2020)
- Education: University of Paris

Hamed Karoui (Arabic: حامد القروي; 30 December 1927 – 27 March 2020) was prime minister of Tunisia from 27 September 1989 to 17 November 1999. From 1986 to 1987 he was Minister of Youth and Sports and from 1988 to 1989 he was Minister of Justice. Born in Sousse, he was a member of the Constitutional Democratic Rally party, and the longest-serving president of Étoile Sportive du Sahel from 1961 to 1981.

== Biography ==
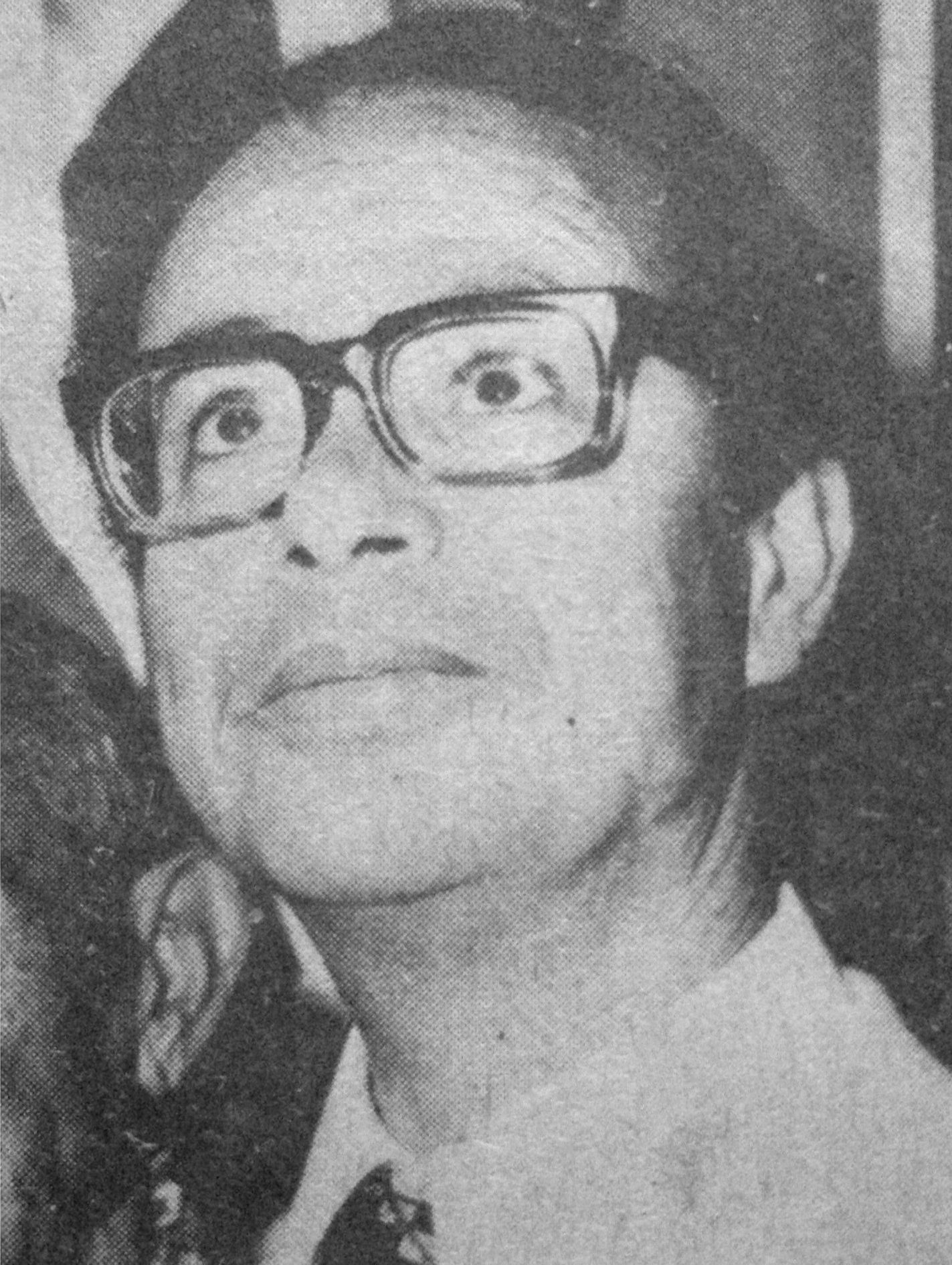
Hamed Karoui in 1970

He continued his primary and secondary studies in Sousse. At the age of 15, he joined Neo-Destour and campaigned in the ranks of the General Union of Tunisian Students (UGET) and the organization of Tunisian Scouts where, at the age of 17, he obtained the rank of district chief. He was also responsible for publishing the underground newspaper Al Kifah for the center of the country.

After graduating in June 1946, he began his graduate studies at the Faculty of Medicine in Paris where he obtained a doctorate and a specialty certificate in pneumo-phthisiology. During his studies, he was elected successively president of the Destourienne cell of Paris, president of the federation Destourienne of France and secretary-general of the UGET. He also represented the student movement at two international congresses held in Prague and Colombo.

Back in Tunisia in 1957, he was assigned to the regional hospital of Sousse to exercise the function of specialist physician in pneumology and head of department. He also presided over the sports clubs of the Stade Soussien in 1962-1963 and then the Étoile sportive du Sahel from 1963 to 1981.

Karoui died on 27 March 2020.

== Political career ==
During the same period, Karoui was head of Sousse-Ville's Destourian bureau from 1957 and 1988 and was elected several times as a member of the Sousse Coordinating Committee.

From 1957 to 1972, he was City Councilor before becoming mayor in 1985.

In 1964, he was elected as deputy to represent the city of Sousse in the National Assembly and was re-elected in 1981, 1986 and 1989.

In 1977, he was elected to be part of the Socialist Destourian Party central committee before being re-elected in 1979.

From 1983 to 1986, he served as vice-president before he was appointed head of the Socialist Destourian Party, which later became the Constitutional Democratic Rally by Zine El Abidine Ben Ali on 17 October 1987.

Karoui joined the government by taking the helm of the Ministry of Youth and Sports from 7 April 1986, to 27 October 1987. After Ben Ali became president on 7 November 1987, he was appointed Minister Delegate to the Prime Minister, then Minister of justice on 24 July 1988.

On 27 September 1989, he became Prime Minister, before he was replaced by Mohamed Ghannouchi on 17 November 1999.
