= Hédi Baccouche =

Tunisian politician (1930–1920)

- الهادي البكوش
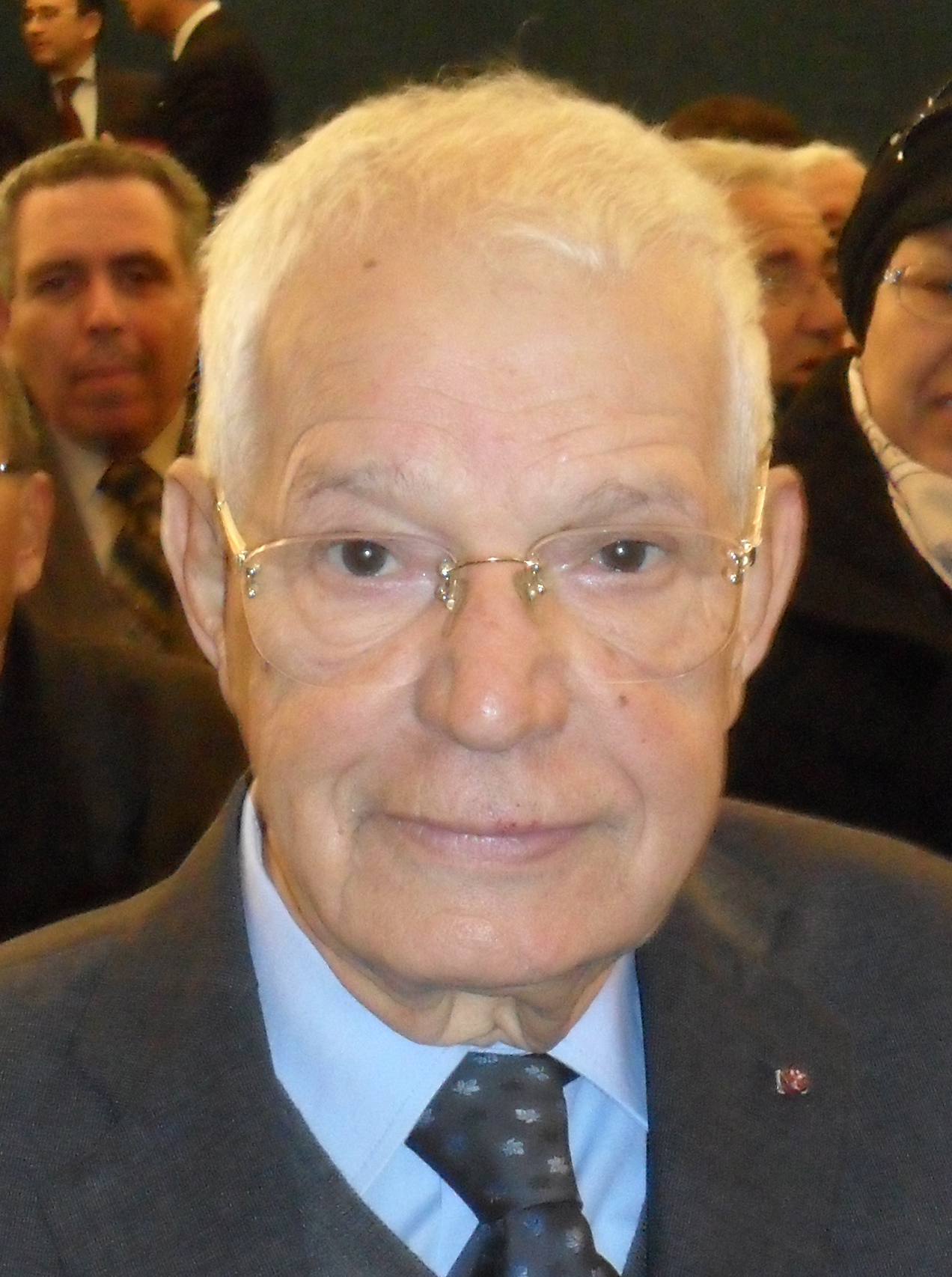
- Baccouche in 2013

Prime Minister of Tunisia
- In office 7 November 1987 – 27 September 1989
- President: Zine El Abidine Ben Ali
- Preceded by: Zine El Abidine Ben Ali
- Succeeded by: Hamed Karoui

Personal details
- Born: 15 January 1930 Hammam Sousse, Tunisia
- Died: 21 January 2020 (aged 90) Hammam Sousse, Tunisia

Hédi Baccouche (Arabic: الهادي البكوش; 15 January 1930 – 21 January 2020) was the prime minister of Tunisia from 7 November 1987 to 27 September 1989. Baccouche led the Socialist Destourian Party until it changed its name to the Constitutional Democratic Rally in 1988. He was born in Hammam Sousse.

== Biography ==
Baccouche studied in France during the 1950s. At the same time, he continued his political activities in the student union of the General Union of Tunisian Students. At the time, he was arrested in France, which was noted by Habib Bourguiba, who welcomed him in person after his release. During the 1960s, he was appointed governor and secretary of the coordination committee of Bizerte, which made him an ex-officio member of the central committee of the Destiny Socialist Party (PSD) after the Congress of Destiny held in Bizerte in 1964 and then he becomes successively governor of Sfax and Gabes. He was also mayor of Hammam Sousse from 1960 to 1964.

Having been dismissed as Governor in the case of Ahmed Ben Salah, he was finally acquitted by the High Court in charge of this case. He later became CEO of the National Fisheries Office and then adviser to the cabinet of Prime Minister Hédi Nouira. Fallen in disgrace after the Congress of Progress and Fidelity of 1979, he is sent as consul general in Lyon. From 1981 to 1982, Baccouche was ambassador to Bern and the Holy See (Vatican) before becoming ambassador to Algeria and director of the PSD. In 1987, he was appointed Minister of Social Affairs.

On 7 November 1987, he replaced Zine el-Abidine Ben Ali, who had just deposed President Bourguiba, as Prime Minister and Secretary General of the PSD. He is considered as the theorist of this "medical coup". On 27 September 1989, Hamed Karoui replaced him.

Baccouche was appointed by President Ben Ali as a member of the Chamber of Advisers when it was created in 2005. He was also a member of the central committee of the ruling Democratic Constitutional Rally, until the dissolution of this body on 20 January 2011, in the context of the Tunisian revolution.

He died on 21 January 2020, six days after his 90th birthday.

== Honours ==
=== Tunisian national medals ===
- (Tunisia) :
- Grand Cordon of the Order of Independence
- Grand Cordon of the Order of the Republic of Tunisia
- Grand Cordon of the Order of the Seventh of November

=== Foreign honors ===
- Algeria : Medal of Honor of the Republic of Algeria
- Lebanon : Grand Cordon of the National Order of the Cedar
- Jordan : Grand Cordon of the Supreme Order of the Renaissance
- Morocco : Grand Cordon of the Order of Ouissam Alaouite
- Romania : Grand Officier of the Order of the Star of Romania
- Finland : First Class Commander of the Order of the White Rose of Finland
- Niger : Knight of the Order of the Niger

== Publications ==
- L'agression française contre Sakiet Sidi Youssef, Tunis, ed. Institut supérieur d'histoire du mouvement national, 2008
- En toute franchise, Tunis, ed. Sud Éditions, 2018

Preceded by Zine El Abidine Ben Ali	Prime Minister of Tunisia; 1987–1989	Succeeded by Hamed Karoui
