= Abdelaziz Ben Dhia =

Tunisian politician (1936–2015)

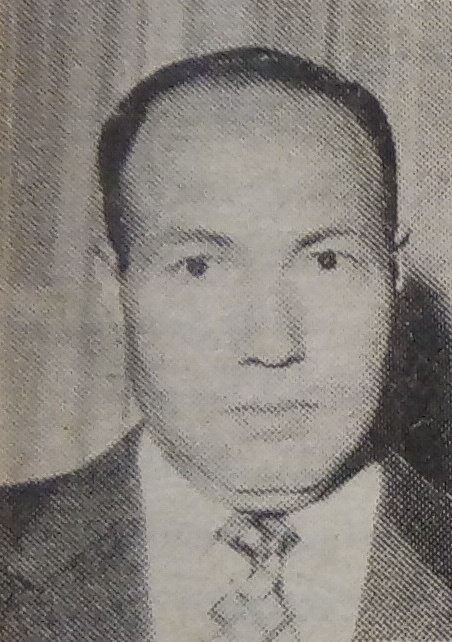

Abdelaziz Ben Dhia (19 December 1936, Moknine – 23 February 2015) served as the Tunisian Special Adviser to the President and Spokesman of the Republic under former President Zine El Abidine Ben Ali. In the aftermath of the 2010–2011 Tunisian revolution, he was placed under house arrest.
