= President of Tunisia =

Head of state

President of the Republic of Tunisia
- رئيس الجمهورية التونسية
- Presidential seal

- Presidential standard

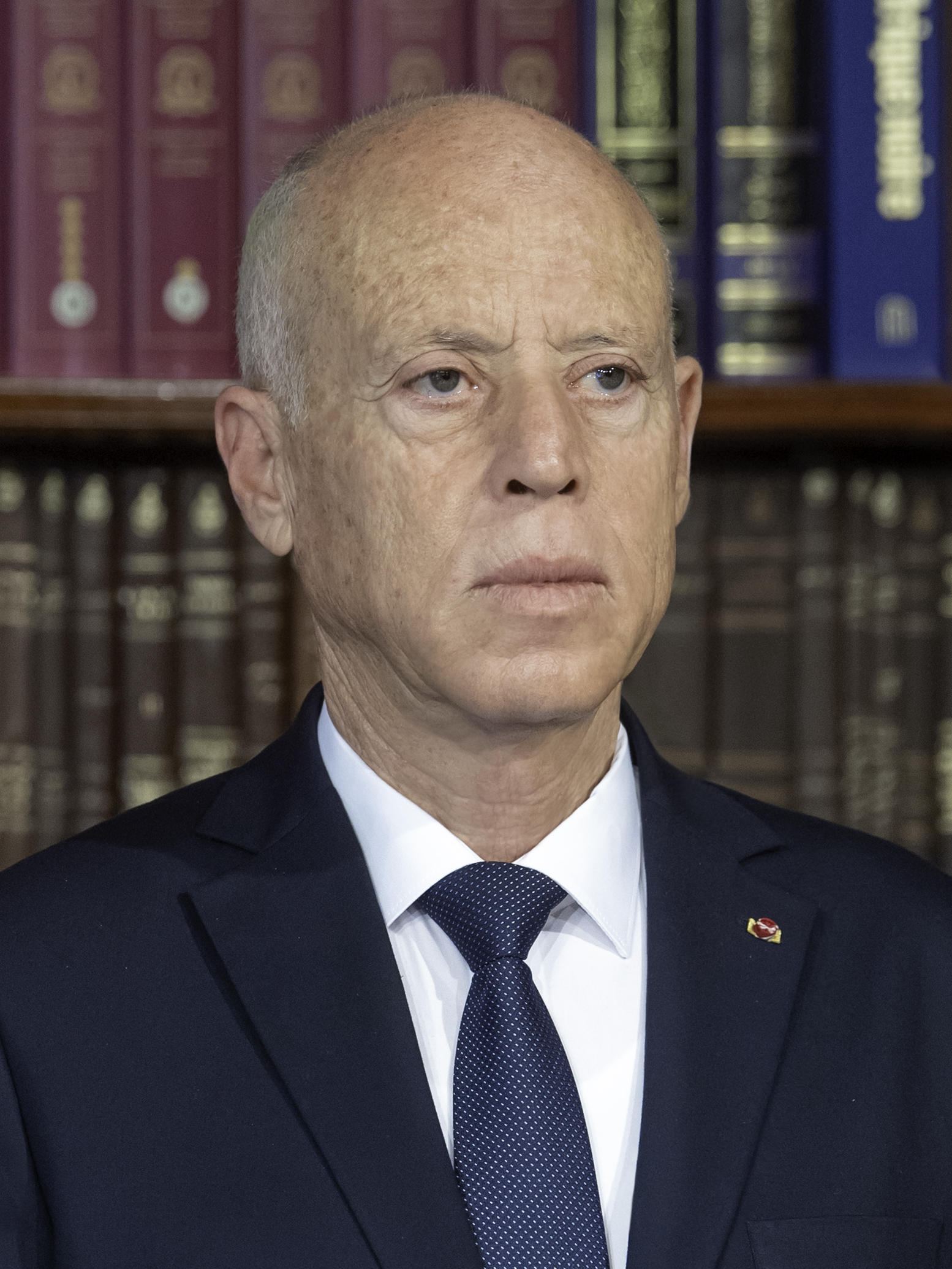
- Incumbent; Kais Saied since 23 October 2019
- Executive branch of the Government of the Republic of Tunisia; Head of state of the Republic of Tunisia
- Style: His Excellency
- Type: Head of state; Head of government (de facto); Commander-in-chief
- Residence: Carthage Palace, Carthage
- Term length: Five years, renewable once
- Constituting instrument: Constitution of Tunisia (2022)
- Inaugural holder: Habib Bourguiba
- Formation: 25 July 1957; 69 years ago
- Salary: US$90,380 annually
- Website: www.carthage.tn

The president of Tunisia, officially the president of the Republic of Tunisia (Arabic: رئيس الجمهورية التونسية, romanized: Ra'īs al-Jumhūriyyah at-Tūnisiyyah), is the executive head of state of Tunisia. The president exercises executive power with the assistance of a government headed by the prime minister in a presidential system and is the commander-in-chief of the Tunisian Armed Forces. Under the Constitution, the president is elected by direct universal suffrage for a term of five years, renewable once.

The first president of the Tunisian Republic when the position was created on 25 July 1957 was Habib Bourguiba, who remained in power for 30 years until he was removed through the coup of 7 November 1987, by his prime minister Zine El Abidine Ben Ali, who appointed himself President of the Republic, and in turn remained in power for 23 years, until his fall in the Tunisian revolution on 14 January 2011. He then appointed Fouad Mebazaa as interim president, until he handed over power on 13 December 2011 to the politician Moncef Marzouki, the first democratic president in the country's history, who was elected by the Constituent Assembly.

Marzouki handed over power on 31 December 2014 to his successor, Beji Caid Essebsi, who won the 2014 presidential elections, thus becoming the second directly democratically elected president in the history of Tunisia, until his death on 25 July 2019, with Parliament Speaker Mohamed Ennaceur assuming the presidency temporarily until presidential elections were held. Bourguiba and Ben Ali also headed the ruling party, called the Neo Destour, Socialist Destourian Party then the Democratic Constitutional Rally, from independence in 1956 until the Tunisian revolution in 2011, when the president of the republic must abandon his party status if he wins the presidency. The 2022 Tunisian constitutional referendum transformed Tunisia into a presidential republic, giving the president sweeping powers while largely limiting the role of the parliament. The current president of the Republic of Tunisia is Kais Saied, since 23 October 2019.

== History ==
Since the promulgation of a republican constitution in June 1959, three years after gaining independence from France, Tunisia has had just four directly elected presidents. The first president was Habib Bourguiba, who became the country's first president after the proclamation of a republic in 1957; he had been the country's de facto leader as prime minister since independence in 1956. He was formally elected to the post in 1959, and was proclaimed president for life in 1975. He was removed from office in a coup d'état in 1987 by Prime Minister Zine El Abidine Ben Ali after being declared medically unfit to continue in office.

Ben Ali ascended as acting president, was elected in his own right in 1989 and served until 2011, when he was forced from office during an uprising against his rule. In the country's first free presidential election, held in December 2014, Beji Caid Essebsi was elected in the second round.

For most of its history as an independent state, Tunisia lacked political democracy in the Western sense, and saw widespread violations of human rights. Because of this, presidential elections in Tunisia, such as that of 2009, lacked international credibility. Elections resulted in implausibly high margins for the ruling party, the Constitutional Democratic Rally and its previous incarnations as the Neo Destour party and the Socialist Destourian Party. Prior to 1999, presidential candidates had to be endorsed by at least 30 political figures—a realistic possibility only for a candidate from a well-organized party like the RCD. Given the RCD's near-total domination of Tunisian politics, opposition candidates found it impossible to get their nomination papers signed. Even when this requirement was lifted, incumbent Ben Ali was reelected three more times by implausibly high margins; his lowest margin was 89 percent in 2009.

Tunisia's original republican constitution vested the president with sweeping executive and legislative powers. Indeed, within the context of the system, he was a virtual dictator. He was elected for a term of five years, with no term limits. In 1975, five months after winning his third full term, Bourguiba was named president for life. From 1987 to 2002, a president was limited to three five-year terms, with no more than two in a row. However, this provision was removed in June 2002. The 2014 Constitution retained the presidency as the key institution, but hedged it about with numerous checks and balances to prevent a repeat of past authoritarian excesses. Most notably, a president is limited to two five-year terms, even if they are non-successive. The Constitution explicitly forbids any amendment to increase the length of a president's term or allow him to run for more than two terms.

Under the current constitution, the president is primarily responsible for foreign policy, defense and national security, while the head of government (prime minister) is responsible for domestic policy. Following Zine El Abidine Ben Ali's ousting in January 2011, prime minister Mohamed Ghannouchi invoked article 56 of the Constitution regarding temporary absence of the president to assume the role of acting president. This move was deemed unconstitutional by the Constitutional Court hours later and President of the Chamber of Deputies Fouad Mebazaa was appointed as acting president based on article 57 of the Constitution regarding permanent absence of the president. On 12 December 2011, Moncef Marzouki was elected by the newly formed Constituent Assembly as interim president of the Republic.

== Elections ==
The president is elected by universal suffrage by majority during elections held in the last sixty days of the previous presidential term. Article 74 of the Constitution establishes that the right to presidential candidacy is open to every Tunisian national of at least 35 years of age and of Muslim faith. Candidates must renounce any prior nationality upon election.

Voting takes place in the form of a two round election. Article 75 indicates that if no candidate receives an absolute majority of the votes cast during the first round, a second round shall be held within two weeks of the announcement of the final results of the first round. The two candidates having received the most votes in the first round are both presented in the second round, with the candidate receiving the most votes between the two being declared president-elect. If one of the candidates on the ballot dies, a new call for candidates is made, with new election dates set within no more than 45 days; this provision does not apply to the potential withdrawal of candidates. The Constitution also specifies that one may not occupy the position of president for more than two full terms, consecutive or non-consecutive, and that in the event of resignation, the term is considered to have been completed in full.

== List ==
No.	Portrait	Name	Start of term	End of term	Term length	Political affiliation	Notes
1		Habib Bourguiba (1903–2000)	25 July 1957	7 November 1987	30 years, 105 days	Neo-Destour	Prime Minister under Muhammad VIII al-Amin, Bey of Tunis, Bourguiba ousted the sovereign by proclaiming a republican regime on 25 July 1957, of which he was elected president. Elected overwhelmingly as President of the Tunisian Republic on 8 November 1959, and being the only candidate in this election, Bourguiba was elected president for life on 18 March 1975. He was dismissed on 7 November 1987 by his prime minister Zine El Abidine Ben Ali.
1		Habib Bourguiba (1903–2000)	25 July 1957	7 November 1987	30 years, 105 days	SDP	Prime Minister under Muhammad VIII al-Amin, Bey of Tunis, Bourguiba ousted the sovereign by proclaiming a republican regime on 25 July 1957, of which he was elected president. Elected overwhelmingly as President of the Tunisian Republic on 8 November 1959, and being the only candidate in this election, Bourguiba was elected president for life on 18 March 1975. He was dismissed on 7 November 1987 by his prime minister Zine El Abidine Ben Ali.
2		Zine El Abidine Ben Ali (1936–2019)	7 November 1987	14 January 2011	23 years, 68 days	SDP	Prime Minister and Minister of Interior of President Bourguiba, Ben Ali had the head of state dismissed, citing an age that was too high to continue presiding over the country. In December 2010, he faced a major wave of popular protests; he finally left the presidency on 14 January 2011, under pressure from demonstrators, and took refuge in Saudi Arabia, with his wife Leïla Ben Ali.
2		Zine El Abidine Ben Ali (1936–2019)	7 November 1987	14 January 2011	23 years, 68 days	DCR	Prime Minister and Minister of Interior of President Bourguiba, Ben Ali had the head of state dismissed, citing an age that was too high to continue presiding over the country. In December 2010, he faced a major wave of popular protests; he finally left the presidency on 14 January 2011, under pressure from demonstrators, and took refuge in Saudi Arabia, with his wife Leïla Ben Ali.
(-)		Fouad Mebazaa (1933–2025)	15 January 2011	13 December 2011	332 days	DCR	As President of the Chamber of Deputies, Mebazaa became interim president of the republic on 15 January 2011, after the departure of President Ben Ali to Saudi Arabia. He convenes the Constituent Assembly.
(-)		Fouad Mebazaa (1933–2025)	15 January 2011	13 December 2011	332 days	Independent	As President of the Chamber of Deputies, Mebazaa became interim president of the republic on 15 January 2011, after the departure of President Ben Ali to Saudi Arabia. He convenes the Constituent Assembly.
3		Moncef Marzouki (b. 1945)	13 December 2011	31 December 2014	3 years, 18 days	CFR	The first president of the republic to be inaugurated after the Tunisian revolution which led to the fall of President Ben Ali, Moncef Marzouki is also the first president not to come from the ranks of the ruling party since independence.
4		Beji Caid Essebsi (1926–2019)	31 December 2014	25 July 2019 †	4 years, 206 days	Nidaa Tounes	By winning the 2014 presidential elections in the second round against the outgoing president, Marzouki, Caïd Essebsi became the first president elected democratically by direct universal suffrage after the revolution. He dies in office on 25 July 2019.
(-)		Mohamed Ennaceur (b. 1934)	25 July 2019	23 October 2019	90 days	Nidaa Tounes	He acts as interim Speaker of the Assembly of the Representatives of the People for a maximum of 90 days.
5		Kais Saied (b. 1958)	23 October 2019	present	6 years, 319 days	Independent	By winning the 2019 presidential election in the second round against Nabil Karoui, Saïed becomes the first independent elected President of the Republic. He is also the first president born after independence, as well as the first born under the mandate of one of his predecessors. On 25 July 2021, he suspended Parliament and dismissed the head of government Hichem Mechichi then published a decree on exceptional powers during the period preceding the adoption of a new Constitution.

== Latest election ==
Candidate	Party		
Candidate	Party	Votes	%
Kais Saied	Independent	2,438,954	90.69
Ayachi Zammel	Azimoun	197,551	7.35
Zouhair Maghzaoui	People's Movement	52,903	1.97
Blank votes		34,187	1.22
Invalid votes		84,953	3.02
Total		3,465,184	100.00
Registered voters/turnout		9,753,217	28.80
Source: Independent High Authority for Elections (preliminary)

== See also ==
- Tunisia
  - List of beys of Tunis
  - List of French residents-general in Tunisia
  - List of presidents of Tunisia
  - First Lady of Tunisia
  - Prime Minister of Tunisia
- Lists of office-holders
- List of current heads of state and government
