= President for life =

Presidency with no term limit

President for life is a title assumed by or granted to some presidents to extend their tenure up until their death or retirement. The title sometimes confers on the holder the right to nominate or appoint a successor. The term is often used by political leaders that aspire to legitimise their absolute power.

== Overview ==
The term "president for life" usually refers to autocrats.

Many leaders who proclaimed themselves president for life have not in fact successfully gone on to serve a life term. Most were deposed before they died, and others achieved a lifetime presidency by being assassinated while in office. However, some have managed to rule until their natural deaths, including José Gaspar Rodríguez de Francia of Paraguay, Alexandre Pétion and François Duvalier of Haiti, Rafael Carrera of Guatemala, Josip Broz Tito of Yugoslavia, and Saparmurat Niyazov of Turkmenistan. Others made unsuccessful attempts to have themselves named president for life, such as Mobutu Sese Seko of Zaire in 1972.

Some long-serving autocratic presidents are mistakenly described as presidents for life. They were never officially granted life terms and stood periodically for re-election. However, in most cases, these were sham elections which guaranteed them re-election. Conversely, Malietoa Tanumafili II of Samoa, who was granted a life term as O le Ao o le Malo by the constitution, which normally provides for five-year terms, was mistakenly described as a monarch due to the ambiguous title of his position and its styling of Highness.

== See also ==
- Dictator
- Democratic backsliding
- Life tenure
- Tyrant
