= Socialist Destourian Party =

1964–1988 ruling party of Tunisia

Constitutional Socialist Party حزب الاشتراكي الدستوري
- French name: Parti socialiste destourien
- Former presidents: Habib Bourguiba (1964–1987); Zine El Abidine Ben Ali (1987–1988)
- Founded: 22 October 1964 (61 years, 279 days)
- Dissolved: 27 February 1988 (38 years, 151 days)
- Preceded by: Neo Destour
- Succeeded by: Democratic Constitutional Rally
- Newspaper: L'Action Tunisienne
- Ideology: Tunisian nationalism Secularism; Authoritarianism; Bourguibism; 1964–1969: Socialism; 1987–1988: Economic liberalism
- Political position: Centre-left; 1964–1969: Left-wing; 1987–1988: Centre
- International affiliation: Progressive Socialist Organizations of the Mediterranean; Socialist International

The Socialist Destourian Party (Arabic: الحزب الاشتراكي الدستوري el-Ḥizb el-Ishtirākī ed-Dustūrī ; French: Parti socialiste destourien; lit. 'Constitutional Socialist Party') was the ruling political party of Tunisia from 1964 to 1988. Bahi Ladgham was the first Prime Minister from the party and Hédi Baccouche was the last. It was founded on 22 October 1964 and disbanded on 27 February 1988. Habib Bourgiba was the first president of the Socialist Destourian Party from 1964 to 1987. He was succeeded by Zine El Abidine Ben Ali from 1987 to 1988.

== History ==
The Independence of Tunisia from France was negotiated largely by the Neo Destour's Bourguiba. The effective date was March 20, 1956. The next year the Republic of Tunisia was constituted, which replaced the Beylical form of government. Tunisia became a one-party state, with Neo Destour as the ruling party under Prime Minister and later President Habib Bourguiba. Later the Neo Destour party was renamed the Socialist Destourian Party in 1964, to signal the government's commitment to a socialist phase of political-economic development. This phase failed to fulfill expectations, however, and was discontinued in 1969 with the dismissal of Ahmed Ben Salah as economics minister by President Bourguiba. During its existence between 1964 and 1988, the Constitutional Socialist Party witnessed several shocks, the first of which resulted from its abandonment of the socialist experiment in the fall of 1969 without abandoning its name at that time.

The party was dissolved by President Ben Ali in 1988 and replaced by the Democratic Constitutional Rally.

== Leaders ==
- Habib Bourguiba (1964–1987)
- Zine El Abidine Ben Ali (1987–1988)

== Electoral history ==
=== Presidential elections ===
| Election | Party candidate | Votes | % | Result |
|---|---|---|---|---|
| 1964 | Habib Bourguiba | | 100% | Elected ✓ |
| 1969 | Habib Bourguiba | | 100% | Elected ✓ |
| 1974 | Habib Bourguiba | | 100% | Elected ✓ |

=== Chamber of Deputies elections ===
| Election | Party leader | Votes | % | Seats | +/– | Position | Result |
|---|---|---|---|---|---|---|---|
| 1964 | Habib Bourguiba | 1,255,153 | 100% | 101 / 101 | ▲101 | ▲1st | Sole legal party |
| 1969 | Habib Bourguiba | 1,363,939 | 100% | 101 / 101 | Steady | 1st | Sole legal party |
| 1974 | Habib Bourguiba | 1,570,954 | 100% | 112 / 112 | ▲11 | 1st | Sole legal party |
| 1979 | Habib Bourguiba | 1,560,753 | 100% | 121 / 121 | ▲9 | 1st | Sole legal party |
| 1981 | Habib Bourguiba | 1,828,363 in alliance with the UGTT | 94.2% | 136 / 136 | ▲15 | 1st | SDP–UGTT coalition government |
| 1986 | Habib Bourguiba | in alliance with the UGTT | | 125 / 125 | ▼11 | 1st | SDP–UGTT coalition government |

== See also ==
- Destour
- Neo Destour
- Democratic Constitutional Rally (RCD)
