= List of ambassadors of Tunisia to the United States =

Coordinates: 38.906764°N 77.035144°W

Ambassador of Tunisia to United States
- Seat: Embassy of Tunisia in Washington, D.C.
- Inaugural holder: Habib Bourguiba, Jr.
- Formation: August 6, 1956
- Website: https://www.tunisianembassy.org/

The Tunisian Ambassador in Washington, D.C. is the official representative of the Government in Tunis to the Government of United States.

== List of representatives ==
| Diplomatic agrément | Diplomatic accreditation | Ambassador | Observations | Heads of government of Tunisia | List of presidents of the United States | Term end |
|---|---|---|---|---|---|---|
| August 6, 1956 | | Habib Bourguiba, Jr. | As Chargé d'affaires he opened the embassy. | Habib Bourguiba | Dwight D. Eisenhower | |
| August 30, 1956 | September 6, 1956 | Mongi Slim | | Habib Bourguiba | Dwight D. Eisenhower | |
| March 3, 1961 | March 10, 1961 | Habib Bourguiba, Jr. | | Habib Bourguiba | John F. Kennedy | |
| March 10, 1964 | April 8, 1964 | Rachid Driss | | Habib Bourguiba | Lyndon B. Johnson | |
| December 11, 1969 | December 18, 1969 | Slaheddine El-Goulli | "(* June 22, 1919 in Sousse) He was the son of Abdesselam el-Goulli and Helena el-Goulli.: He visited the College, de Sousse, College Sainte Barbe, Sorbonne and University de Paris.; From 1947 to 1956 he was Director General of cos..; From 1956 to 1957 he was ConsulGen. Marseilles.; From 1958 to 1961 he was Minister, Washington.; 1961 Alternate Executive Director World Bank .; 1962–1969Ambassador to Belgium, also accredited to Netherlands and Luxembourg, concurrently Perm.; 1969Representative to European Economic Community. Perm. Representative.; From 1970 to 1973 he was Ambassador to United States of America.; From 1970 to 1973 also accredited to Mexico; From 1972 to 1973 also to Venezuela.; From 1974 to 1976 he was Special Adviser to Foreign Minister.; From 1976 to 1978 he was Ambassador to the Netherlands.; In 1979 he was Adviser Foreign Ministry.; Since 1980 he was Chairman PDGPhilips (Tunisia) Tunis .; President Tunis World Trade Center.; 1966 Grand Cordon de l’Ordre de la Republique Tunisienne, also decorations from Belgium, Netherlands and Luxembourg." | Bahi Ladgham | Richard Nixon | |
| January 11, 1974 | February 1, 1974 | Ali Hedda | (born October 30, 1930, in Sousse) graduated in Political Science of the Institut des Sciences Politiques de Paris | Hédi Nouira | Gerald Ford | |
| November 23, 1981 | December 8, 1981 | Habib Ben Yahia | | Mohamed Mzali | Ronald Reagan | |
| October 13, 1988 | November 9, 1988 | Abdelaziz Hamzaoui | | Zine el-Abidine Ben Ali | Ronald Reagan | |
| March 6, 1991 | April 11, 1991 | Ismail Khelil | | Hamed Karoui | George H. W. Bush | |
| October 21, 1994 | November 21, 1994 | Azouz Ennifar | | Hamed Karoui | Bill Clinton | |
| October 23, 1997 | November 12, 1997 | Noureddine Mejdoub | | Hamed Karoui | Bill Clinton | |
| October 6, 2000 | October 19, 2000 | Hatem Atallah | | Mohamed Ghannouchi | Bill Clinton | |
| March 4, 2005 | March 8, 2005 | Mohamed Nejib Hachana | | Mohamed Ghannouchi | George W. Bush | |
| April 4, 2009 | May 20, 2009 | Habib Mansour | | Mohamed Ghannouchi | Barack Obama | |
| October 1, 2010 | December 7, 2010 | Mohamed Salah Tekaya | | Mohamed Ghannouchi | Barack Obama | |
| April 9, 2013 | April 15, 2013 | Mokhtar Chaouachi | | Ali Laarayedh | Barack Obama | |
| December 13, 2013 | March 10, 2014 | Mhamad Ezzine Chelaifa | | Ali Laarayedh | Barack Obama | |
| May 8, 2015 | May 18, 2015 | Faycal Gouia | | Habib Essid | Barack Obama | August 27, 2016 |

- United States–Tunisia relations
