= Chedly Ayari =

Tunisian politician and economist (1933–2021)

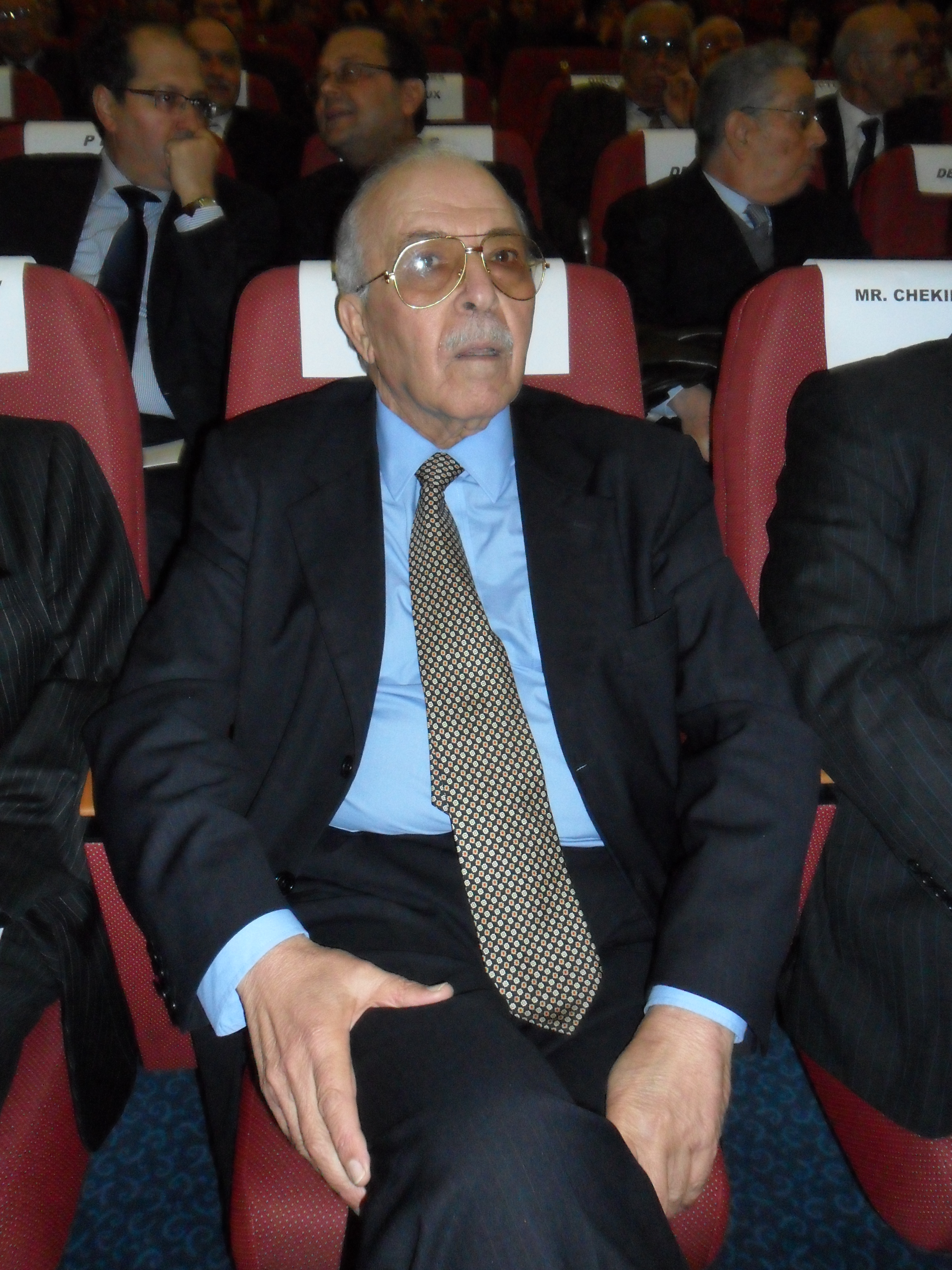
- Ayari in 2013

President of the Central Bank of Tunisia
- In office 24 July 2012 – 16 February 2018
- Preceded by: Mustapha Kamel Nabli
- Succeeded by: Marouane Abassi

Minister of Equipment, Housing and Spatial Planning
- In office 25 September 1974 – 19 February 1975
- Preceded by: Mustapha Zaanouni
- Succeeded by: Mansour Moalla

Minister of Finance
- In office 22 March 1972 – 25 September 1974
- Preceded by: Mekki Zidi
- Succeeded by: Abdelaziz Lasram

Minister of Education
- In office 12 June 1970 – 29 October 1971
- Preceded by: Mohammed Mzali
- Succeeded by: Abdelaziz Beltaïef

Minister of Youth and Sports
- In office 12 June 1970 – 6 November 1970
- Preceded by: Mohammed Mzali
- Succeeded by: Abdelaziz Beltaïef

Minister of Equipment, Housing and Spatial Planning
- In office 7 November 1969 – 12 June 1970
- Preceded by: Abderrazak Rassaa
- Succeeded by: Mansour Moalla

Personal details
- Born: 21 August 1933 Tunis, French Tunisia
- Died: 28 January 2021 (aged 87)
- Party: PSD

Chedly Ayari (Arabic: الشاذلي العياري) (8 August 1933 – 28 January 2021) was a Tunisian politician, economist, and diplomat. He served in several ministerial positions under the government of Habib Bourguiba and was President of the Central Bank of Tunisia from 24 July 2012 to 16 February 2018.

== Early life and education ==
Ayari was born in Tunis. After his secondary studies at Sadiki College, he enrolled in the School for Advanced Studies in the Social Sciences. He earned a doctorate in economics in 1961 and a master's degree in private law from the School for Advanced Studies in the Social Sciences of the Paris-Sorbonne University.

== Career ==
Ayari began his career as a department head at the Société Tunisienne de Banque before becoming an assistant professor at Tunis University the following year. He earned an agrégation in economics from the University of Paris and became a professor at Tunis University and at the Faculté de droit et des sciences économiques et de gestion de Tunis, as well as an assistant professor at Aix-Marseille University and the University of Nice Sophia Antipolis. During his career, he earned the title of doctorus honoris causa from Aix-Marseille University and Honorary President of the Association internationale des sociologues de langue française.

As a researcher, Ayari studied international financial and monetary relations, macroeconomic policy, and human development. He was involved in several international research institutions, such as the Economic Research Forum in Cairo. He was also vice-president of the Tunisian National Advisory Council for Scientific Research and Technology. He was Director General of the Centre d'études et de recherches économiques et sociales from 1967 to 1969, a member of the scientific council of the Tunisian Foundation for Translation, Preparation of Texts and Studies, a member of the Conseil tunisien de la recherche scientifique et technologique, and an honorary member of the Tunisian Academy of Sciences, Letters, and Arts. He was the author of numerous books focusing on economic, financial, monetary, social, and political issues, which were published in French, Arabic, English, and German. Several of his articles were published in the Revue tunisienne de sciences sociales.

Ayari was a militant for the Tunisian national movement as a member of the General Union of Tunisian Students. He was then a member of the political office and central committee of the Socialist Destourian Party until 1975. President Habib Bourguiba appointed him to numerous ministerial positions within his cabinet. He served as Minister of Equipment, Housing and Spatial Planning from 7 November 1969 to 12 June 1970 and again from 25 September 1974 to 19 February 1975. He was Minister of Youth and Sports from 12 June 1970 to 6 November 1970, while also serving as Minister of Education from 12 June 1970 to 29 October 1971. He was Minister of Finance from 22 March 1972 to 25 September 1974. On 22 January 2010, he was appointed by decree to the Chamber of Advisors.

Ayari held several diplomatic responsibilities, such as economic advisor to the Tunisian delegation at the United Nations in New York City from 1960 to 1964. He was also Ambassador to the European Commission, Belgium, and Luxembourg in 1972. He was Chairman of the Commission for Industrial Development at the UN in 1962, executive director of the World Bank from 1964 to 1965, and a member of the advisory board for the African Development Bank. He directed the Arab Bank for Economic Development in Africa from its foundation in 1974 until 1988.

Ayari was appointed president of the Central Bank of Tunisia on 24 July 2012, replacing Mustapha Kamel Nabli and being approved by the Constituent Assembly of Tunisia by a vote of 97 to 89, with 4 abstentions. His approval was highly criticized due to his relationship with former ruler Zine El Abidine Ben Ali, who was overthrown during the Tunisian Revolution in 2011. As President of the Bank, he sought to improve the Tunisian economic situation, while bringing reforms to banking and financial systems within the country. Thanks to his efforts, he won the Tatweej Award for Excellence and Quality in the Arab world in 2014. In 2017, he earned a grade of B from the Central Banker Report Cards, awarded by the American magazine Global Finance. On 14 February 2018, he assured the Assembly of the Representatives of the People in a hearing that Tunisia's placement on the blacklist of the European Parliament was purely political. That same day, he submitted his resignation as President of the Central Bank of Tunisia to Prime Minister Youssef Chahed. His successor, Marouane Abassi, was appointed on 19 February 2018.

== Personal life ==
He was the son of Sadok and Fatouma Ayari. He married Élaine Vatteau in 1959, and the couple lived in Gammarth, where their three children were born.

He died of COVID-19 during the COVID-19 pandemic in Tunisia aged 87.

== Honours ==
- Grand Cordon of the Order of Tunisian Independence
- Grand Cordon of the Order of the Tunisian Republic
- Grand Officer of the Ordre du 7-Novembre
- Grand Officer of the Legion of Honour

== Publications ==
- Analyse de la structure économique : les fonctions de structure économique (1968)
- La coopération inter-universitaire dans la promotion du développement (1969)
- Mécanismes et institutions de la coopération arabo-africaine : le rôle de la BADEA (1975)
- De nouvelles perspectives pour la coopération arabo-africaine (1981)
- Arab-African co-operation: facing the challenge of the '80s (1985)
- Ten Years of Afro-Arab Cooperation, 1975-1984 (1985)
- La Guerre du Golfe et l'avenir des Arabes : débat et réflexions (1991)
- Enjeux méditerranéens : pour une coopération euro-arabe (1992)
- La Méditerranée économique. Premier rapport général sur la situation des riverains au début des années 1990 (1992)
- Mélanges en l'honneur de Habib Ayadi (2000)
- La souveraineté nationale face à la mondialisation : conflit non résolu (2002)
- Le système de développement tunisien : vue rétrospective. Les années 1962-1986. Analyse institutionnelle (2003)
- Variables internationales et nouveaux rôles régionaux (2005)
- Carnet de route d’un artisan de la Tunisie du XXe siècle (2023)
