= Abderrazak Rassaa =

Tunisian politician (1930–2020)

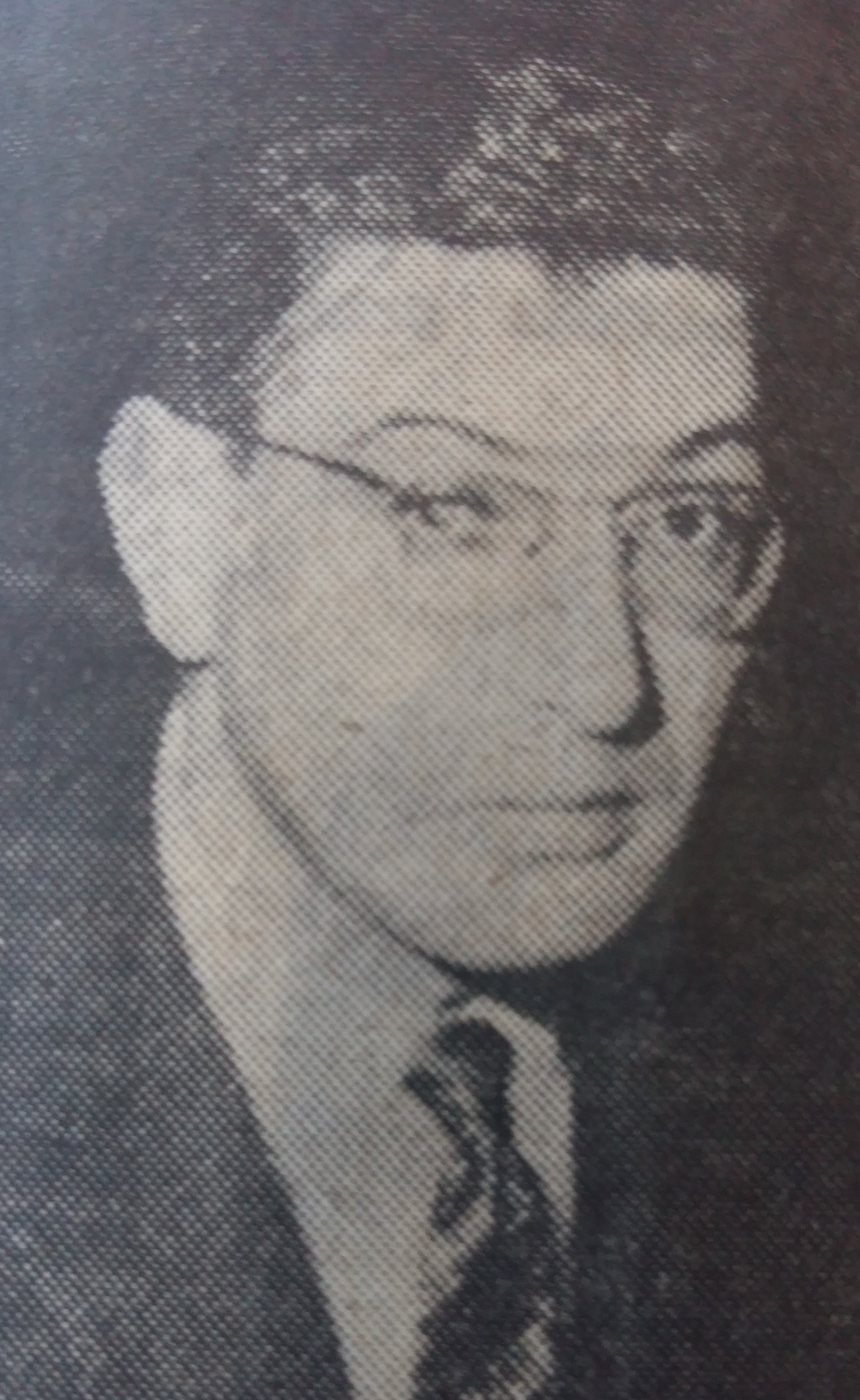

Minister of Finance
- In office 8 September 1969 – 29 October 1971
- Prime Minister: Bahi Ladgham; Hédi Nouira
- Preceded by: Ahmed Ben Salah
- Succeeded by: Mohamed Fitouri

Minister of Industry
- In office 24 September 1968 – 8 September 1969
- Preceded by: Ahmed Ben Salah
- Succeeded by: Hassen Belkhodja

Personal details
- Born: 4 January 1930 Tunis, Tunisia
- Died: 7 January 2020 (aged 90)
- Party: Socialist Destourian Party

Abderrazak Rassaa (Arabic: عبد الرزاق الرصاع) (4 January 1930 – 7 January 2020) was a Tunisian politician.

== Biography ==
Rassaa started out as a French professor at Carnot high school Tunis. After this teaching stint he became CEO of the Banque de Tunisie. From 1958 to 1964, he served on the board of directors of the Central Bank of Tunisia. Rassaa became Minister of Industry in 1968 and Minister of Finance the following year, where he served until 1971.

Abderrazak Rassaa died on 7 January 2020 at the age of 90.
