= Slaheddine Ben Mbarek =

Tunisian politician (1936–2014)

Tunisian minister of Trade
- In office 10 March 1995 – 13 June 1996
- Prime Minister: Hamed Karoui
- Preceded by: Sadok Rabah (minister of National Economy)
- Succeeded by: Mondher Zenaidi

Tunisian minister of Agriculture
- In office 27 July 1988 – 11 April 1989
- Prime Minister: Hédi Baccouche
- Preceded by: Lassaad Ben Osman
- Succeeded by: Nouri Zorgati

Tunisian minister of Trade and Industry and then of National Economy
- In office 28 April 1986 – 27 July 1988
- Prime Minister: Mohamed Mzali; Rachid Sfar; Zine el-Abidine Ben Ali; Hédi Baccouche
- Preceded by: Rachid Sfar (minister of National Economy)
- Succeeded by: Moncef Belaïd (minister of Industry)

Tunisian minister of Trade
- In office 26 December 1977 – 24 April 1980
- Prime Minister: Hédi Nouira
- Preceded by: Hassen Belkhodja
- Succeeded by: Moncef Belaïd

Personal details
- Born: 1 September 1936 Béja, French Tunisia
- Died: 22 July 2014 (aged 77) Tunis1 Tunisia
- Party: Democratic Constitutional Rally (1988-2011)
- Other political affiliations: Socialist Destourian Party (Before 1988)

Slaheddine Ben Mbarek (27 July 1936, in Béja – 22 July 2014) was a Tunisian minister, diplomat and the president of his hometown soccer team Olympique Béja from 1984 until 1985.

He was the ambassador of Tunisia to Belgium then to West Germany

He was Minister of Economy and Trade from 1977 until 1980.

From 1986 to 1988, he was minister of Industry and Trade, from 1988 to 1989, minister of Agriculture.

He was once again minister of Trade between 1995 and 1996.
