= Abdelkefi =

Abdelkefi is a surname. Notable people with the surname include:

- Ahmed Abdelkefi (born 1941), Tunisian economist and businessman
- Fadhel Abdelkefi (born 1970), Tunisian businessman and politician, son of Ahmed
