= Ministry of Finance (Tunisia) =

Government minister of Tunisia

- وزارة المالية
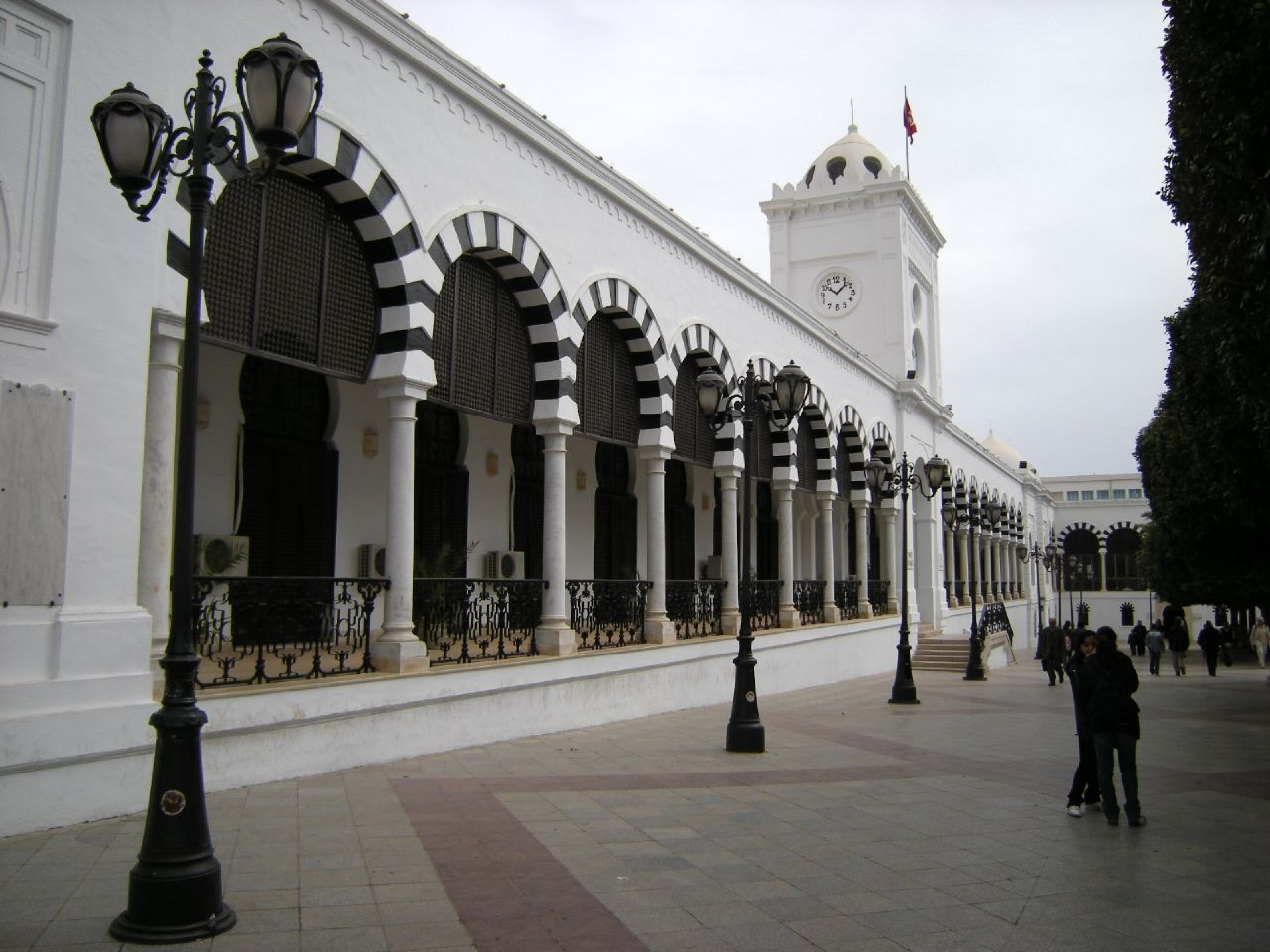

Agency overview
- Jurisdiction: Government of Tunisia
- Headquarters: Tunis
- Minister responsible: Mechket Slama, Minister of Finance
- Website: v2.portail.finances.gov.tn

The Ministry of Finance (Arabic: وزارة المالية) is a government ministry office of the Republic of Tunisia, responsible for finance and tax affairs in Tunisia. The current minister is Mechket Slama since 5 February 2025.

== List of ministers ==
- 1956–1958: Hedi Amara Nouira
- 1958: Bahi Ladgham
- 1958–1960: Ahmed Mestiri
- 1960: Bahi Ladgham
- 1960–1961: Hédi Khefacha
- 1961–1969: Ahmed Ben Salah
- 1969–1971: Abderrazak Rassaa
- 1971–1977: Mohamed Fitouri
- 1977–1980: Abdelaziz Mathari
- 1980–1983: Mansour Moalla
- 1983–1986: Mohammed El Azzabi
- 1986: Rachid Sfar
- 1986–1987: Ismaïl Khelil
- 1987–1989: Nouri Zorgati
- 1989–1992: Mohamed Ghannouchi
- 1992–1997: Nouri Zorgati
- 1997–1999: Mohamed Jeri
- 1999–2004: Taoufik Baccar
- 2004: Mounir Jaidane
- 2004–2010: Mohamed Rachid Kechiche
- 2010–2011: Mohamed Ridha Chalghoum
- 2011: Jalloul Ayed
- 2011–2012: Houcine Dimassi
- 2012–2013: Slim Besbes (interim)
- 2013–2014: Elyes Fakhfakh
- 2014–2015: Hakim Ben Hammouda
- 2015–2016: Slim Chaker
- 2016–2017: Lamia Zribi
- 2017: Fadhel Abdelkefi
- 2017–2020: Ridha Chalghoum
- 2020: Nizar Yaïche
- 2020-2021: Ali Kaali
- 2021–2025: Sihem Boughdiri
- 2025–present: Mechket Slama
