= Ahmed Mestiri =

Tunisian lawyer and politician (1925–2021)

Ahmed Mestiri أحمد المستيري
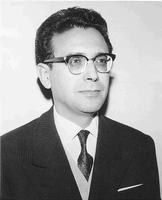
- Portrait of Ahmed Mestiri.

Secretary General of the Movement of Socialist Democrats
- In office 10 June 1978 – 10 September 1989
- Preceded by: Founding of the party
- Succeeded by: Mohamed Moada

Tunisian Minister of the Interior
- In office 12 June 1970 – 4 September 1971
- President: Habib Bourguiba
- Preceded by: Hédi Khefacha
- Succeeded by: Hédi Nouira

Tunisian Secretary of State for Defense
- In office 22 June 1966 – 22 June 1966
- President: Habib Bourguiba
- Preceded by: Bahi Ladgham
- Succeeded by: Bahi Ladgham

Tunisian Secretary of State for Finance and Trade
- In office 30 December 1958 – 2 August 1960
- President: Habib Bourguiba
- Preceded by: Ezzeddine Abassi
- Succeeded by: Bahi Ladgham

Tunisian Secretary of State for Justice
- In office 15 April 1956 – 30 December 1958
- Monarch: Lamine Bey
- President: Habib Bourguiba
- Preceded by: Moussa El Kadhem Ben Achour
- Succeeded by: Hédi Khefacha

Personal details
- Born: 2 July 1925 La Marsa (Tunisia)
- Died: 23 May 2021 (aged 95)
- Education: University of Paris
- Occupation: Lawyer, Politician

Ahmed Mestiri (Arabic: أحمد المستيري; 2 July 1925 – 23 May 2021) was a Tunisian lawyer and politician who served as Minister of the Interior.

== Biography ==
=== Early life ===
Mestiri was born into a wealthy landowning family connected to the Tunisian upper bourgeoisie, the son of Taher Mestiri and Khedija Kassar. He joined the Destour Party cell of La Marsa alongside Taïeb Mhiri in 1942 at a young age. He pursued law studies in Algiers from 1944 to 1948, and furthered his education at the Paris Institute of Political Studies and the Paris Law Faculty, earning his license. Starting in 1948, Mestiri practiced law in Tunis. By 1950, as a member of the Destourian federation of Tunis, he worked with figures like Bahi Ladgham and Hédi Nouira on the weekly publication Mission, a French-language outlet of Neo Destour. In January 1952, he joined the clandestine transitional leadership of Neo Destour, alongside notable figures including Farhat Hached and Hédi Nouira—tasked with resistance activities against the French occupation. As a defense lawyer for nationalist activists, Mestiri survived an assassination attempt by the Red Hand terrorist group. He was responsible for organizing and overseeing resistance efforts with various collaborators. Following the assassination of Hached in December 1952, Mestiri went into hiding to evade police capture due to legal actions and a removal order against him.

=== Political career ===
==== Minister and ambassador ====
In August 1954, Mestiri became chief of staff to Mongi Slim, the minister of state from Neo Destour tasked with leading negotiations with France, culminating in Tunisia's internal autonomy a year later. By September 1955, following Slim's appointment as Minister of the Interior in Tahar Ben Ammar's government, Mestiri played a key role in the negotiations that led to France recognizing Tunisia's independence on 20 March 1956. Elected as a deputy for Tunis-Banlieue in the constituent assembly on 25 March 1956, he was part of the age office alongside Ahmed Ben Salah and Mohamed Chenik, contributing to the inaugural speech of the assembly. In the first government formed by Habib Bourguiba on 15 April, he was appointed Minister of Justice, where he was instrumental in the Tunisification of the judicial system, drafting new laws, and developing the Code of Personal Status. Following his significant contribution to Tunisia's legal reform, Mestiri represented Tunisia at the United Nations Security Council amid the conflict with France over the bombing of Sakiet Sidi Youssef. On 30 December 1958, he took on the finance and trade portfolio, focusing on Franco-Tunisian conventions and establishing the Tunisian dinar. Mestiri also served as Tunisia's first ambassador to the USSR, Poland, Czechoslovakia, the United Arab Republic (Syria and Egypt), and Algeria between 1960 and 1962. He returned to Tunis on 22 June 1966, to assume the role of Minister of National Defense.

==== Alienation and return to the PSD ====
During the final months of 1967, the agricultural and commercial reforms initiated by Ahmed Ben Salah, backed by President Bourguiba and the Neo-Destour party—later known as the Destourian Socialist Party (PSD)—met with significant opposition within Tunisia, despite efforts by official statements and the press to conceal this. The discontent became so pronounced that by January 1968, the issue was discussed in meetings of the Superior Planning Council and the PSD's political bureau. Mestiri voiced his opposition to the government's policies, highlighting public grievances against regional officials, questioning the state's role in managing economic enterprises, and criticizing the overzealous approach to the reforms. On 26 January, Bourguiba dismissed Mestiri's concerns, reaffirming his full support for the reforms. Consequently, on 29 January 1968, Mestiri resigned from his government position and the PSD's political bureau during a meeting with Bourguiba, later publicizing his reasons for resignation through a statement to United Press International and Le Monde, which was fully reproduced by the Tunisian press. He was immediately expelled from the PSD as a result.

On 10 September 1969, Ahmed Mestiri ended a twenty-month period of silence by expressing his support for President Bourguiba's decision to halt reforms and reassign portfolios from Ben Salah, retaining only the national education for him. In a statement on 4 October, Mestiri criticized the government's past actions and proposed a recovery program, advocating for the postponement of upcoming presidential and legislative elections due to Bourguiba's ill health. Despite previously facing conditions for reinstatement into the PSD that he found undignified, Mestiri was reinstated on 23 April 1970, and soon after reconciled with Bourguiba, signaling a return to political favor.

Mestiri's influence grew as he was appointed rapporteur of the PSD's higher commission in June 1970, tasked with drafting reforms and amendments to the 1959 Constitution. His efforts culminated in a significant proposal to expand the National Assembly's competences and introduce democratic rules within the PSD. However, his advocacy for democratization led to his resignation from the Minister of the Interior and PSD member on 21 June 1971, after Bourguiba's promises of reform failed to materialize, though Bourguiba refused to accept his resignation initially.

Conflict with the regime's conservative wing, particularly over security appointments, led to Mestiri's dismissal as Minister of the Interior by presidential decree on 4 September 1971. Despite this setback, Mestiri's leadership in the PSD's liberal wing was confirmed during the VIIIth Congress in Monastir, where significant reform resolutions were passed. However, Bourguiba's subsequent dismissal of these resolutions and Mestiri's suspension from the party marked a deepening rift. Mestiri's steadfast refusal to retract his critical statements further isolated him within the party, reflecting the regime's broader move towards normalization and the suppression of reformist voices.

==== Permanent break with the regime ====
On 21 January 1972, Ahmed Mestiri was expelled from the PSD but continued to serve as a deputy, frequently criticizing the government. In November of the same year, he, along with ten other Destourian figures, sent a letter to President Bourguiba critiquing the political and economic state of Tunisia. His exclusion from the National Assembly on 20 July 1973, under a revived electoral code provision initially aimed at Ben Salah, symbolized his complete break from the PSD. This move followed his poignant final speech in the Assembly, where he emphasized principles over personal grievances, marking a significant turn in his political trajectory.

Transitioning to opposition, Mestiri founded the Movement of Socialist Democrats (MDS) in June 1978, becoming its secretary general. Despite the MDS's initial success in the 1981 pluralist elections, the regime manipulated the results to ensure a PSD victory, an action widely criticized by both domestic and international observers for its blatant fraud. Mestiri's public denunciation of this manipulation in the media underscored the challenges faced by opposition parties in Tunisia. By April 1986, his continued dissent led to his arrest and subsequent house arrest after participating in a protest. In 1989, Mestiri withdrew from his leadership role in the MDS and retired from political life.

=== Private life ===
In 1956, he married Souad Chenik, daughter of the former grand vizier Mohamed Chenik. He fathered five children: four boys (Driss, Tahar, Hatem and Moncef) and a daughter (Asma). His eldest son, Driss, died in 1971 at the age of 14.

== Publications ==
- A testimony for History, Tunis, Sud Éditions, 2011.
