= Ismaïl Khelil =

Tunisian politician

- إسماعيل خليل

Tunisian Ambassador to the United States
- In office 6 March 1991 – 11 April 1991
- Preceded by: Abdelaziz Hamzaoui
- Succeeded by: Azouz Ennifar

Minister of Foreign Affairs
- In office 3 March 1990 – 28 August 1990
- Preceded by: Abdelhamid Escheikh
- Succeeded by: Habib Boularès

Governor of the Central Bank of Tunisia
- In office 27 October 1987 – 3 March 1990
- Preceded by: Mohamed Skhiri
- Succeeded by: Mohamed El Béji Hamda

Minister of Finance
- In office 8 July 1986 – 27 October 1987
- Preceded by: Rachid Sfar
- Succeeded by: Nouri Zorgati

Minister of Regional Development
- In office 18 June 1983 – 27 October 1987
- Preceded by: Mansour Moalla
- Succeeded by: Mohamed Ghannouchi

Personal details
- Born: 11 July 1932 Gafsa, Tunisia
- Died: 20 November 2017 (aged 85)
- Party: Socialist Destourian Party

Ismaïl Khelil (11 July 1932 – 20 November 2017) was a Tunisian politician.

== Biography ==
After studying at the University of Grenoble, where he obtained a license, he worked as a secretary at the Tunisian embassy in Rome from 1957 to 1960 and then as an advisor at the Tunisian embassy in Washington until 1964. He then became mayor of Gafsa (1966–1969) and ambassador of Tunisia in London (1969–1972) and Brussels (1972–1978), then director general of international cooperation at the Ministry of Foreign Affairs (1978–1979). He also directed the airline Tunisair between 1979 and 1980 and joined the World Bank as executive director between 1980 and 1984.

He occupied the functions of Minister of Planning between 18 June 1983 and 27 October 1987 and Minister of Finance between 8 July 1986 and 27 October 1987, in a difficult economic climate caused by the indebtedness then known the country. He hands over his portfolios following a government reshuffle initiated by the new Prime Minister Zine el-Abidine Ben Ali.

He was then appointed governor of the Central Bank of Tunisia, a position he retains upon Ben Ali's accession to the presidency of the Tunisia until 3 March 1990. He then briefly served as minister of finance. Foreign Affairs from 3 March to 28 August 1990. He then became Ambassador of Tunisia to the United States on 6 March 1991.

After completing his responsibilities in Washington in 1994, he worked in the private sector, as an adviser to Amen Bank and as chairman of the board of the Mediterranean Insurance and Reinsurance Company.

In Washington, he was elected member of the Cosmos Club.
