= Mzali =

Mzali (Arabic: مزالي) is an Amazigh surname. Notable people with the surname include:

- Fethia Mzali (1927–2018), Tunisian teacher and politician
- Mohammed Mzali (1925–2010), Tunisian politician
  - Mohamed-Mzali Sports Hall, indoor sports arena in Monastir, Tunisia
- Mohamed Salah Mzali (1896–1984), Tunisian educator, historian, and politician
