= Moalla =

Moalla (Arabic: معلى) is a surname of Arab origin. It is mostly used in Tunisia. Notable people with the surname include:

- Fatma Moalla (born 1939), Tunisian mathematician
- Ismaïl Moalla (born 1990), Tunisian volleyball player
- Mansour Moalla (born 1930), Tunisian economist and politician
- Nejla Moalla (born on 1963), Tunisian engineer and politician
- Moalla, a graphic Persian calligraphy
