= Slim Chaker =

Tunisian politician

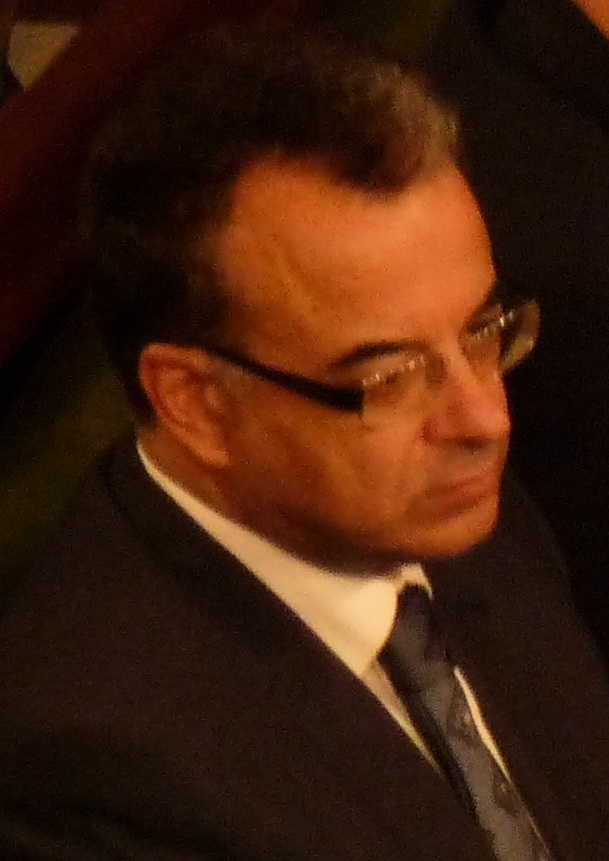

Minister of Public Health
- In office 12 September 2017 – 8 October 2017
- Prime Minister: Youssef Chahed
- Preceded by: Samira Merai
- Succeeded by: Sonia Ben Cheikh (Acting)

Minister of Finance
- In office 6 February 2015 – 27 August 2016
- Prime Minister: Habib Essid
- Preceded by: Hakim Ben Hammouda
- Succeeded by: Lamia Zribi

Minister of Youth and Sport
- In office 1 July 2011 – 24 December 2011
- Prime Minister: Béji Caïd Essebsi
- Preceded by: Mohamed Aloulou
- Succeeded by: Tarak Dhiab

Secretary for the Minister of Commerce in charge of Tourism
- In office 17 January 2011 – 1 July 2011
- Prime Minister: Mohamed Ghannouchi; Béji Caïd Essebsi
- Preceded by: Mohsen Laroui
- Succeeded by: Béchir Zaâfouri

Personal details
- Born: 24 August 1961 Sfax, Tunisia
- Died: 8 October 2017 (aged 56) Tunis, Tunisia
- Cause of death: Heart attack
- Party: Nidaa Tounes (2012–2017)
- Parent: Mohamed Chaker (father)

Slim Chaker (24 August 1961 – 8 October 2017) was a Tunisian politician who served as the Minister of Health of Tunisia from 12 September to 8 October 2017 before his death. A member of Nidaa Tounes, he was the minister of Youth and Sports from 1 July, until 24 December 2011, in the government of Beji Caid Essebsi.

== Biography ==
=== Family and education ===
Born into a family of the former Sfaxian notability, he was the son of Mohamed Chaker and the grandson of Tunisian politician and national movement figure Hédi Chaker. He obtained his baccalauréat at Sadiki College in Tunis in 1979, then pursued three years of undergraduate studies in mathematics at the École Normale Supérieure of Tunis until 1983. He also studied in Paris, where he graduated as a statistical engineer from ENSAE-CESD, and later, in 2008, obtained an MBA from the Mediterranean School of Business.

=== Career ===
He was Minister of Youth and Sports from July to December 2011, in the government of Béji Caïd Essebsi. Became a member of Nidaa Tounes, where he was in charge of economic and social programs, he was the Minister of Finance in the government of Habib Essid from February 2015 to August 2016 and briefly Tunisian Minister of Public Health in the government of Youssef Chahed from September 2017 to his death.

== Death and tributes ==
Slim Chaker died on 8 October 2017 at the military hospital in Tunis following a heart attack, shortly after participating in a marathon organized by Nourane to promote the fight against breast cancer. He was succeeded on 7 November by Mohamed Trabelsi, and on 18 November Imed Hammami succeeded him.

On 9 October, a minute of silence was observed in his memory across public and private health institutions in Tunisia.

The Minister of Women, Family and Childhood, Néziha Labidi, decided to rename the “Octobre Rose” marathon, in which he had participated, in his honor.

== Personal life ==
Slim Chaker was married to Amel Miled and had three children: Mariem, Hajer, and Mohamed Ali.

== Honours ==
On 23 November 2011, he was awarded the insignia of Commander of the Tunisian Order of the Republic.

== See also ==
Tunisian Revolution
