= Mohamed Chaker =

Tunisian lawyer and politician (1930–2024)

- مَحمد شاكر
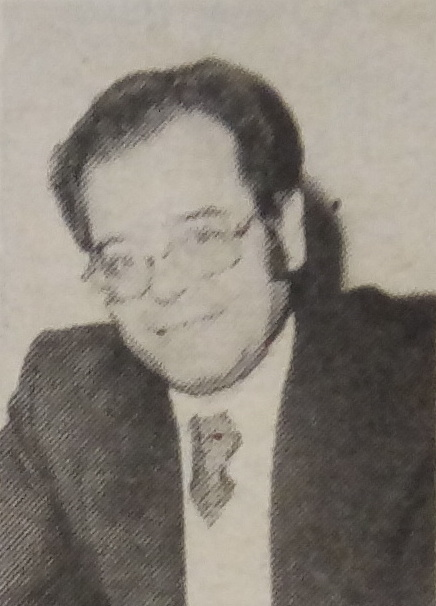
- Chaker in 1980

Minister of Justice
- In office 25 April 1980 – 29 October 1984
- President: Habib Bourguiba
- Prime Minister: Mohammed Mzali
- Preceded by: Slaheddine Baly
- Succeeded by: Ridha Ben Ali

Member of the Chamber of Deputies of Tunisia
- In office 1981

Personal details
- Born: 31 December 1930 Sfax, French protectorate of Tunisia
- Died: 24 November 2024 (aged 93)
- Party: Independent
- Children: Slim Chaker
- Relatives: Abdelmajid Chaker (uncle)

Mohamed Chaker (31 December 1930 – 24 November 2024) was a Tunisian lawyer and politician. An independent, he served as minister of justice of Tunisia from 1980 to 1984 and in the Chamber of Deputies of Tunisia in 1981.

Secretary of State to the Prime Minister for Administrative Reform in 1979, he was Minister of Justice between 1980 and 1984, and was elected to the National Assembly in 1981. He also served as ambassador to Algeria and Yugoslavia and as mayor of his hometown of Sfax.

Chaker died on 24 November 2024, at the age of 93.
