= Réalités =

French-language Tunisian magazine

- Editor-in-chief: Zyed Krichen
- Categories: Magazine
- Frequency: Weekly
- Circulation: 23,500 (2006)
- Publisher: Taïeb Zahar
- First issue: 1979; 47 years ago
- Company: Maghreb Media
- Country: Tunisia
- Language: French, Arabic
- Website: Realites.com.tn

Réalités (حقائق meaning Realities in English) is a weekly French-language Tunisian news magazine.

== History and profile ==
An independent magazine, it is published by Maghreb Media each Thursday. It was founded in 1979 by Taïeb Zahar and quickly became an important element of Tunisian national media.

The magazine is published weekly and offers news. It also covers investigative reports.

Following the publication of an article on prison conditions in its December 2002 issue the staff writer was forced to leave the magazine. On 30 December 2010, during the protests, the magazine published an article, praising of the family members of the former President Zine El Abidine Ben Ali.

In 2005, an Arabic version began to be published. Its columnists/editors are Taïeb Zahar, Pascal Boniface, Ridha Lahmar, Hakim Ben Hammouda, Zyed Krichen and Foued Zaouche.

Its 1994 circulation was 25,000 copies. As of June 2006, the magazine had a circulation of 23,500, with 9,500 subscribers.

In 2014 its editor of the culture section, Hanene Zbiss, won the Samir Kassir Award for Freedom of the Press by the European Union for his report entitled “Quranic kindergartens in Tunisia”.
