= Mustapha Kamel =

Mustapha Kamel may refer to:

- Mustapha Kamel Nabli, Tunisian economist
- Mustapha Kamel Selmi, Algerian sprinter
