= Mounir Jaidane =

Tunisian politician

Mounir Jaidane is a Tunisian politician. He was the Secretary General of the Government under former President Zine El Abidine Ben Ali.

== Biography ==
Mounir Jaïdane has a degree in law from the Faculty of Tunis and a degree from the Ecole Nationale d'Administration.

He was appointed Minister of Finance on January 14, 2004 in the Ghannouchi government, replacing Taoufik Baccar.

He became Secretary General of the Government on March 22, 2004 and was replaced by Mohamed Rachid Kechiche at the Ministry of Finance. He continued to serve as Secretary General until January 25, 2007.

Involved in cases of corruption and embezzlement, the investigating judge at the Tunis Court of First Instance ordered, on 1 December 2011, his ban on leaving Tunisian territory.
