= Nouri Zorgati =

Tunisian politician

Minister of Finance
- In office 9 June 1992 – 22 January 1997
- Preceded by: Mohamed Ghannouchi
- Succeeded by: Mohamed Jeri
- In office 27 October 1987 – 11 April 1989
- Preceded by: Ismaïl Khelil
- Succeeded by: Mohamed Ghannouchi

Minister of Agriculture
- In office 11 April 1989 – 20 February 1991
- Preceded by: Slaheddine Ben Mbarek
- Succeeded by: Mouldi Zouaoui

Personal details
- Born: 25 August 1937 Sousse, Tunisia
- Died: 12 October 2014 (aged 77) France
- Party: Democratic Constitutional Rally (1988–2011)
- Other political affiliations: Socialist Destourian Party (until 1988)

Nouri Zorgati (25 August 1937 – 12 October 2014) was a Tunisian politician.

== Career ==
Born in Sousse on 25 August 1937, Zorgati began his political career working for the Ministry of Regional Development from 1968 to 1987. He was first appointed Minister of Finance on 27 October 1987. On 11 April 1989, Zorgati became agriculture minister. He stepped down to serve as the leader of the Union of Tunisian Banks, in Paris, from May 1991 to June 1992. On 9 June 1992, Zorgati began his second stint as finance minister before returning to the Union of Tunisian Banks between 22 January 1997 and 2 August 2002. He also served as a columnist for the magazine Réalités, where he published several of his studies on monetary management and credit.

He died on 12 October 2014, aged 77, at a hospital in France.
