= Mansour Moalla =

Tunisian businessman and politician (born 1930)

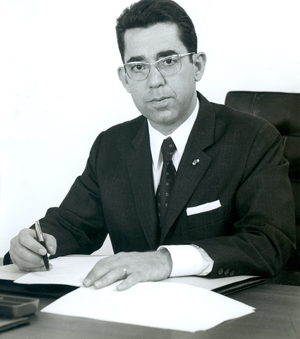

Personal details
- Born: 1 March 1930 (age 96)
- Party: Destour Socialist Party
- Spouse: Nagette Moalla
- Children: 4, including Nejla Moalla
- Education: University of Paris; National School of Administration
- Occupation: Banker

Mansour Moalla (Arabic: منصور معلى; born 1 March 1930) is a Tunisian economist, businessman and politician who held several cabinet posts in the period from the 1960s to the early 1980s.

== Early life and education ==
Moalla was born in Sfax on 1 March 1930. He hails from a family of farmers.

After completing his primary and secondary education in his hometown Moalla studied law in France and graduated in 1953. He also obtained a degree in literature in 1953. He received a Ph.D. in political sciences from the University of Paris. He attended the National School of Administration in France between 1954 and 1956.

Moalla was one of the founders of the General Union of Tunisian Students based in France and assumed its presidency in its second conference held in 1954. During this period he was part of the team who were carrying out the negotiations for internal autonomy led by Tahar Ben Ammar, a leading Tunisian landowner. However, he left the team when his application to the French National School of Administration was accepted.

== Career and activities ==
Moalla started his career as an inspector at the General Inspectorate of Finances and worked there until September 1957. He was made a technical adviser at the Ministry of Finance in 1958 and involved in the establishment of the Central Bank of Tunisia of which he was the first director-general. In the period between 1962 and 1963 he was the president and director-general of the National Society of Investment and the director of Central Administration. Next year he was named as the director of the National School of Administration. He was appointed undersecretary of state for industry and commerce in 1967 and became the director of Central Administration of the Presidency and head of the State Secretariat of Posts, Telegraphs and Telephones in 1969. He was appointed secretary of state and the minister of communications in 1969 which he held until 1970. He was the minister of planning from June 1970 to 1974. He was a member of the Destour Socialist Party and served in its central committee and political bureau between 1980 and 1984. He also served as the minister of planning and finance in the cabinet led by Prime Minister Mohammed Mzali from 1980 to 1983. Moalla was removed by Mzali from the post due to his plans to reform the tax system of Tunisia. Because this reform would not be beneficial for the Tunisian business leaders. Mansour successor as minister of planning was Ismaïl Khelil.

In 1976 Moalla established the Arab International Bank of Tunisia and acted as its director for one year. His partner in the foundation of the bank was Habib Bourguiba Jr., son of the President Habib Bourguiba. Following his removal from cabinet in 1983 Moalla served as the honorary president of the Arab International Bank of Tunisia. Moalla had to resign from all his official positions in order to save the bank in June 1993. He was also founder of the Arab Institute of Business Leaders (Institut Arabe des Chefs d’Entreprises; IACE), a think tank established in 1985. He was the president of the IACE until June 1993. The reason for his resignation was a libellous public campaign due to the allegations of the existence of a Masonic lodge which aimed to “control the structures of the national economy." This campaign was likely to occur following Moalla's criticisms against the Tunisian government for being compliant to the World Bank and International Monetary Fund.

In October 2013 Moalla was one of the potential candidates to head the caretaker government to be formed following the unrest during the Arab Spring events. He did not accept the offer on 31 October.

== Personal life and work ==
Moalla is married and has four children: Nejla, Selim, Alya and Samy.

Moalla is the author of some books including De l'indépendance à la révolution. Système politique et développement économique en Tunisie that was published in 2011. His another book is Sortie de crise et union nationale: pourquoi et comment (French: Exit from the crisis and national unity: why and how) which was published in 2019.

=== Honours ===
Moalla is the recipient of the following: Commander of the Order of the Republic, Officer of the Order of Independence and Grand Cordon of the Order of Tunisian Republic.
