= Zribi =

Tunisian surname

Zribi is a Tunisian surname.

The etymology of the family name Zribi can refer to a person from the island of Djerba in Tunisia (also known as Zerbi or Gerbi up until the 19th century). It can also refer to a person from the ancient thermal citadel-city of Zriba in Tunisia. Some trace the origin to the City of Hamma near Gabes in South Tunisia.

- Lamia Zribi (born 1961), Tunisian politician and minister of finance
