= Maya Jribi =

Tunisian politician (1960–2018)

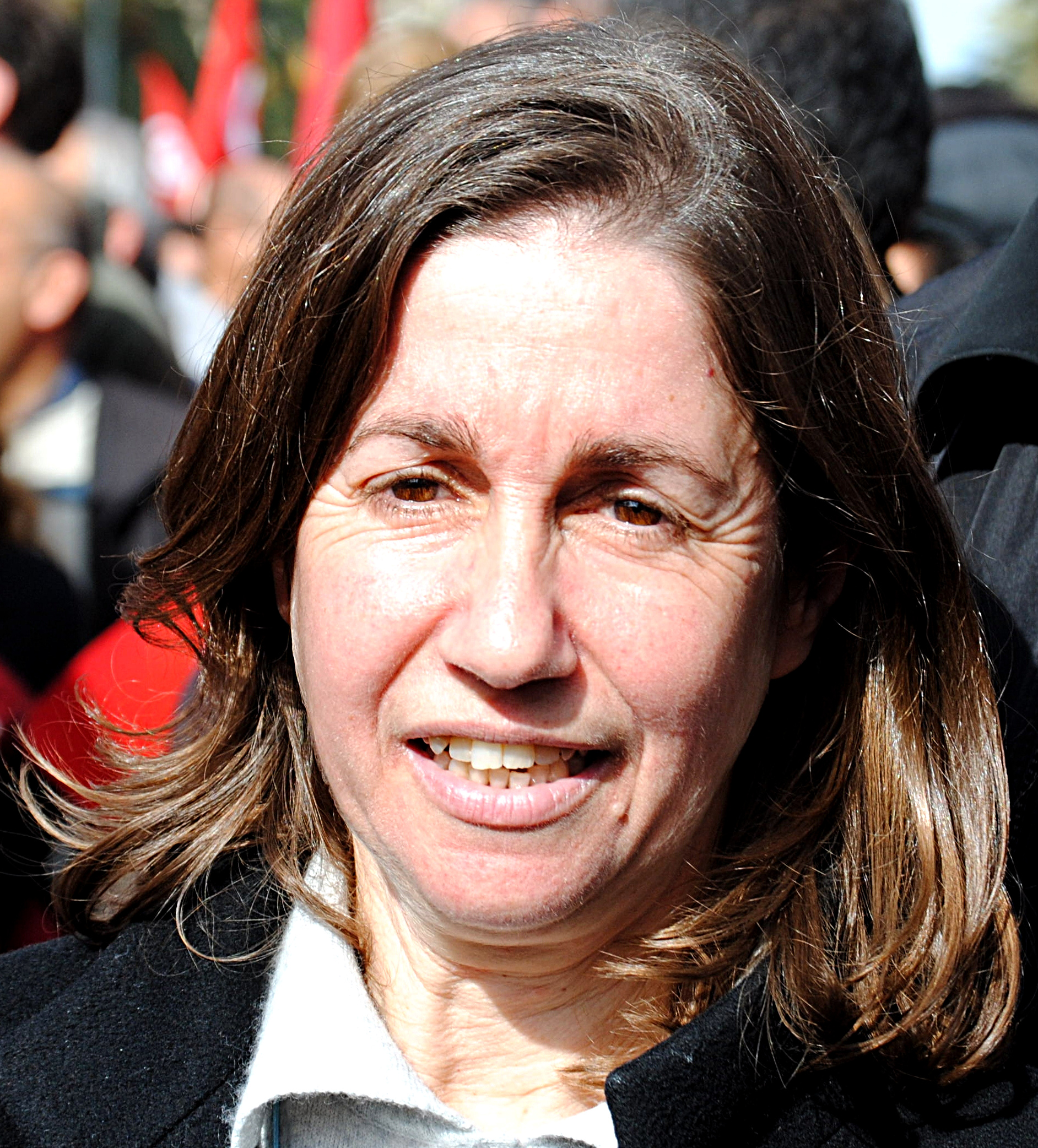

Secretary-General of the Republican Party
- In office April 9, 2012 – February 3, 2017
- Preceded by: Party created
- Succeeded by: Issam Chebbi

Member of the Constituent Assembly of Tunisia from Ben Arous Governorate
- In office November 22, 2011 – December 2, 2014

Personal details
- Born: 29 January 1960 Bou Arada, Tunisia
- Died: 19 May 2018 (aged 58) Radès, Ben Arous Governorate, Tunisia
- Party: Republican Party (from 2012); Progressive Democratic Party (until 2012)
- Education: University of Sfax

Maya Jribi (January 29, 1960 – May 19, 2018) was a Tunisian politician. From 2006 to 2012, she was the leader of the Progressive Democratic Party (PDP). From PDP's merger into the Republican Party in April 2012, until her resignation in 2017, she was the Secretary-General of the centrist party.

== Life and political career ==
Her father is from Tatouine, while her mother is from Algeria. She followed her studies in Radès Tunisia, before studying biology at the University of Sfax, from 1979 to 1983. During that period, she became involved and an active member of the student union, known as UGET, and the Tunisian League of Human Rights. She wrote for the independent weekly Erraï and later for the PDP-newspaper Al Mawkif.

Together with Ahmed Najib Chebbi, Maya Jribi co-founded the Progressive Socialist Rally, established in 1983, which was later renamed into Progressive Democratic Party (PDP). Since 1986 she has been a member of the party's executive. On 25 December 2006, Jribi was appointed Secretary-General of the PDP. She has been the first woman to lead a political party in Tunisia.

From 1 to 20 October 2007, Jribi, along with Najib Chebbi, engaged in a hunger strike to protest against the forced move of the party's headquarters from Tunis, which caused serious health implications for her.

Jribi headed the PDP's electoral list in Ben Arous for the Constituent Assembly Elections in October 2011. The PDP list received one seat in Ben Arous according to preliminary election results. On 9 April 2012, the PDP merged with other secularist parties to form the Republican Party and Maya Jribi became the leader of this party. She presented her candidacy for the presidency of the Constituent Assembly of Tunisia on November 22. She was however defeated by the secretary general of Democratic Forum for Labour and Liberties ( Ettakatol), Mustapha Ben Jaafar who was elected by 145 votes to 68 in his favor.

Maya Jribi was an outspoken feminist. She has labeled Israel as a "Zionist construct", and proposed to disallow Israeli pilgrims to visit the El Ghriba synagogue on Djerba island.

Maya Jribi, announced her retirement, during the Republican Party convention in 2017.

In March 2018, the Center for Research, Studies, Documentation and Information on Women paid tribute to her for her noble political life.

On 19 May 2018 she died of cancer.

The President of Tunisia, in an official statement, called her death the loss of a "sincere activist" and saluted her human qualities and political career.

== Decorations ==
- Commander of the Order of the Republic of Tunisia (2015)
- Knight of National Order of Merit of Tunisia (2014)

== Tributes ==
In March 2018, the Center for Research, Studies, Documentation and Information on Women paid tribute to her for her militant political career. the President of the Tunisian Republic deplored, in an official press release, the loss of a “Sincere activist” and saluted her human qualities and her political career.

On May 21, the Ministry of Women's Affairs announced that the main hall meetings at the ministry's headquarters now bear the name of Maya Jribi.
