= Mohamed Ridha Chalghoum =

Tunisian politician

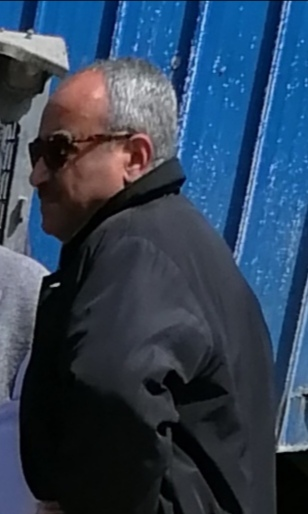
Ridha Chalghoum.jpg

Mohamed Ridha Chalghoum (born 1962) is a Tunisian politician. He was the Minister of Finance from 2010 to 2011 and from 2017 to 2020.

He was born in Gafsa, Tunisia. He has a B.A. in Economics and a degree from the Tunisian Institute of National Defense. He served as Minister of Finance on January 14, 2010 to January 27, 2011, and was reappointed as Finance Minister on September 6, 2017.
