= Abdelmajid Chaker =

Tunisian politician (1927–2021)

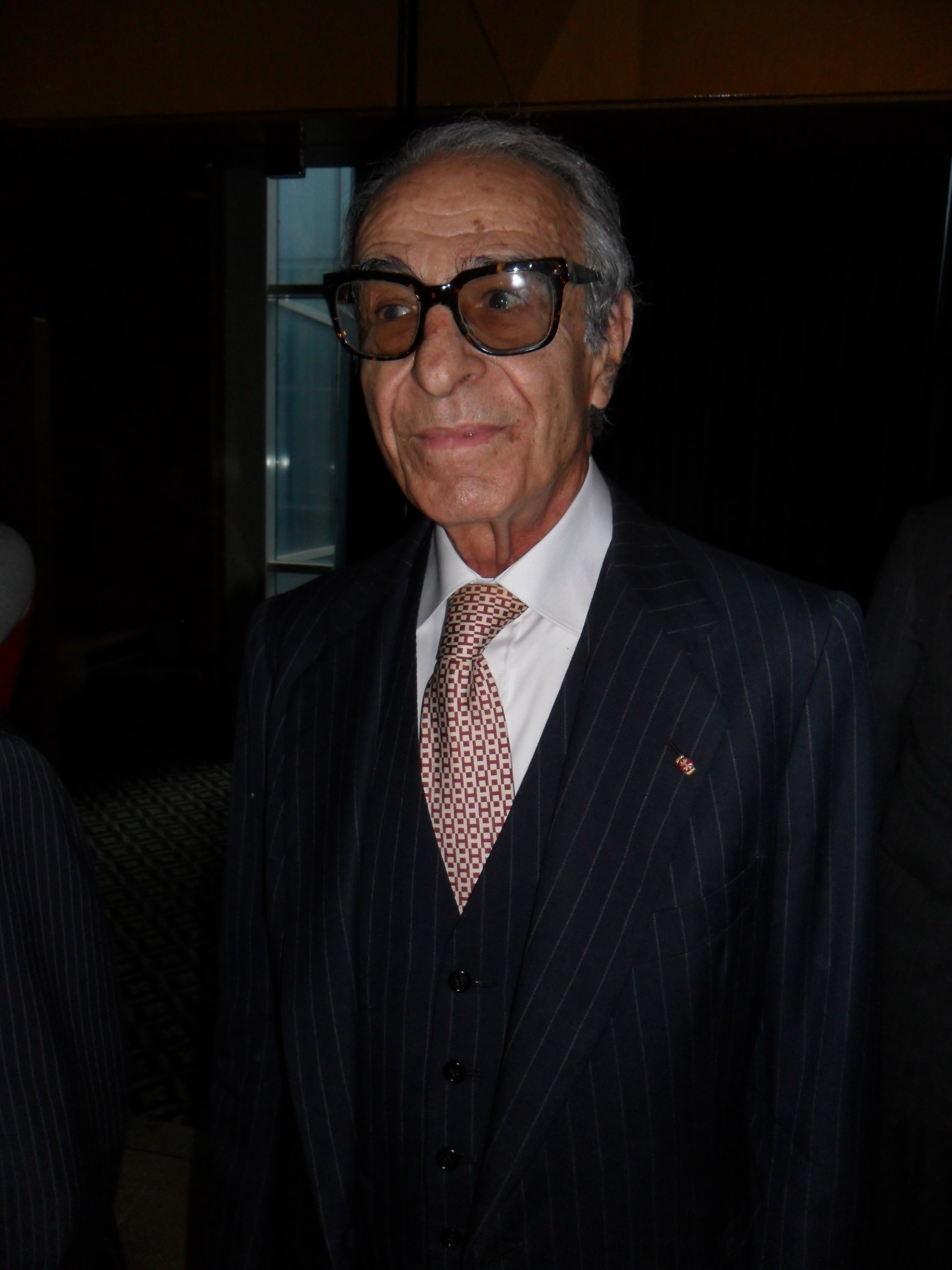
- Chaker in 2013

Minister of Communication
- In office 11 November 1964 – 5 September 1966
- President: Habib Bourguiba
- Preceded by: Chedli Klibi
- Succeeded by: Chedli Klibi

Minister of Agriculture
- In office 3 April 1962 – 12 November 1964
- President: Habib Bourguiba
- Preceded by: Abdesselem Knani
- Succeeded by: Mohamed Jeddi

Member of the Chamber of Deputies of Tunisia
- In office 1959–1974

Personal details
- Born: 23 March 1927 Sfax, French Tunisia
- Died: 25 October 2021 (aged 94) Tunis, Tunisia
- Party: Neo Destour; PSD; Nidaa Tounes
- Relatives: Mohamed Chaker (nephew)

Abdelmajid Chaker (Arabic: عبد المجيد شاكر; 23 March 1927 – 25 October 2021) was a Tunisian politician and nationalist militant.

== Biography ==
Chaker was born into a family close to the Neo Destour movement. His brother, Hédi, was the party's leader in Sfax. In March 1952, Abdelmajid led the Union générale des étudiants de Tunisie. He was arrested the following month and sentenced to ten years in prison for manufacturing homemade bombs and handing out leaflets in favor of Tunisian independence. He was pardoned in 1954 and moved to France to complete his law studies.

Chaker was appointed leader of Neo Destour in August 1956 by Habib Bourguiba, replacing Taïeb Mhiri. During his mandate, he held a crucial role in the Bizerte crisis and transitioning the nation to independence. He was elected to the Chamber of Deputies in 1959 and was re-elected in 1964 and 1969. He served as Minister of Agriculture from 3 April 1962 to 12 November 1964 and Minister of Communication from 11 November 1964 to 5 September 1966. He was replaced as leader of Neo Destour, which became the Socialist Destourian Party (PSD), on 11 November 1964.

Chaker was elected to the central committee of the PSD in 1971 and subsequently held several diplomatic positions. He then left politics after Zine El Abidine Ben Ali rose to power. He became an active member of Les Scouts Tunisiens and actively supported the Club Sportif Sfaxien. He founded the Parti libre destourien tunisien démocratique, which merged with Al Amal. He then joined Nidaa Tounes and became a member of its executive committee. However, he left the party and joined the Mouvement des destouriens libres.

Chaker died in Tunis on 25 October 2021 at the age of 94.
