= Banking in Tunisia =

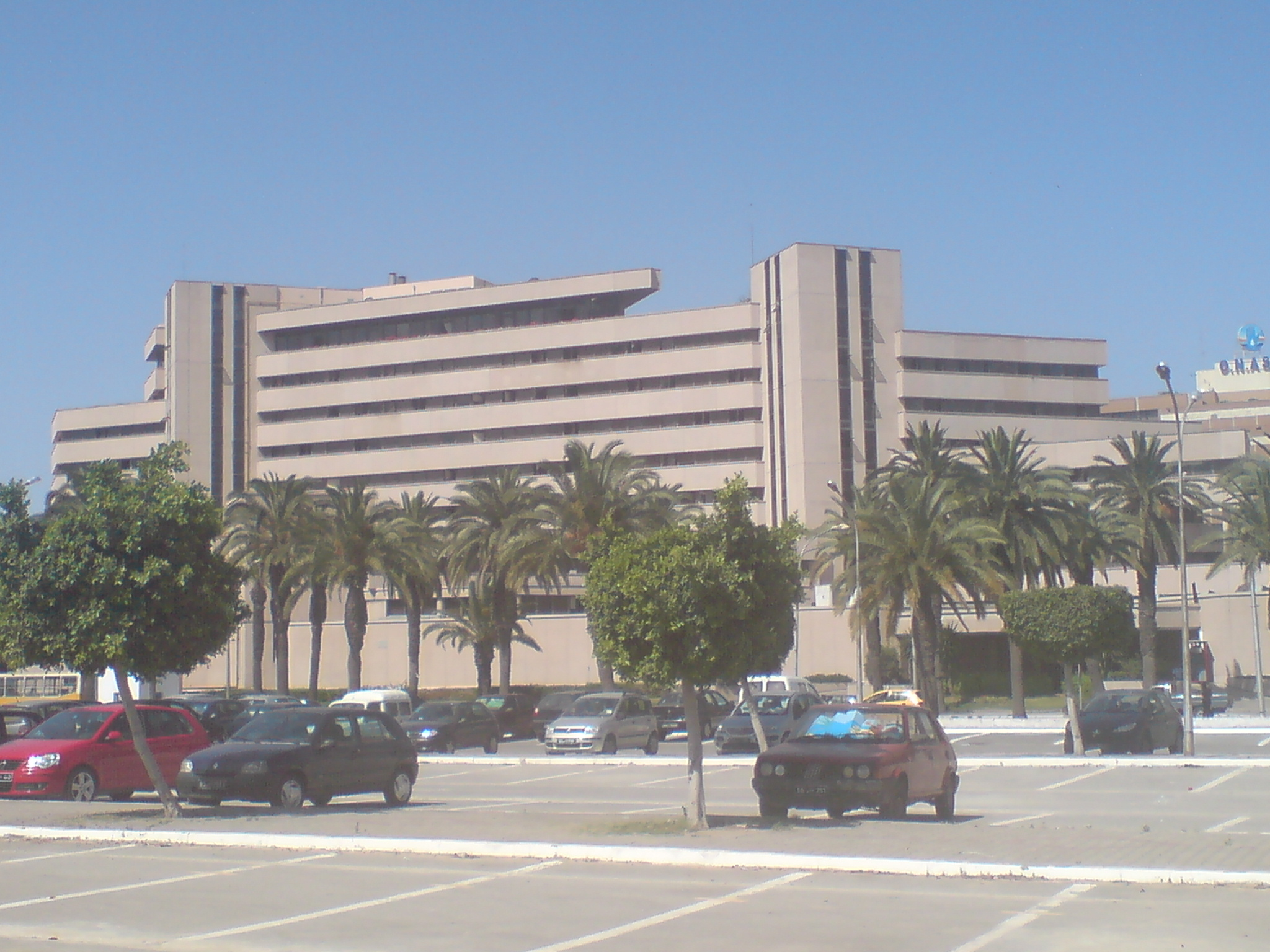
Central bank of Tunisia

Banking in Tunisia is a service industry comprising 23 domestic banks of which, are three state owned banks.

== History ==
Tunisia was among the first to introduce financial reforms in the Middle East and North Africa (MENA) region. The financial sector of the country was tightly controlled through the mid-1980s. Since then, it has undergone three decades of gradual but insufficient reforms. State-owned commercial banks dominate the banking system and account for more than half of market share, which implies state control of the banking sector and is a negative for economic growth. After the fall of Ben Ali regime, the bank sector owned by his close family has been seized by the central bank.

Tunisian banks have a relatively high non-performing loan (NPL) to total loans ratio. The average NPL to total loan ratio for the period 2005-2008 was 18.3%, slightly lower than Egypt's 19.7% but significantly higher than that of Jordan (4.8%), Lebanon (11.9%), and Morocco (10.1%). By 2009, Tunisian NPL rates were falling but were still relatively high at 13.2%.

The 2011 Jasmine Revolution in Tunisia, affected the country's economic, social and political stability, changing the country's prospects. In the wake of this revolution, it has been suggested that a modern offshore banking system would be a viable development strategy for Tunisia, and that it would play an essential role in the country's economic recovery.

The historical, economic and cultural links to Europe, the proximity of Tunisia to the European market, and the strong correlation of economic growth rates in Tunisia with those in nearby Europe could make it an attractive alternative as recent EU and US pressure have forced Switzerland and Luxembourg to partially retreat from banking secrecy.

Tunisia is known for economic and political stability, its highly educated workforce, while Islamic radicalism is weak. Tunisia does not have the resource curse of oil or mineral deposits that often determine instability. From 2000 to 2009, Tunisia grew at an annual rate of 5.2% and its per capita income of about $8,300 (in PPP terms) in 2009 was second only to Lebanon among the oil-importing MENA countries. The stability of the Tunisian Dinar and historically low inflation in Tunisia are positive indicators for its potential development of financial services. Inflation was 4.9% in FY 2007-08 and 3.5% in FY 2008–09. The Tunisian Dinar was less volatile in 2000-2010 than the currencies of its oil-importing neighbors, Egypt and Morocco.

== Post-Arab Spring Bank Restructuring and Bailouts ==
Following the fall of the authoritarian president Zine el-Abidine Ben Ali, the poor health of the three major state banks has come to light. Because the three big state banks (Société Tunisienne de Banque, Banque de l'Habitat, and Banque Nationale Agricole) make up about 40% of total banking assets in the country, they are structurally important for the economy. As Tunisia's tourism sector has suffered following the 2011 revolution and the 2015 terrorist attack in Sousse, the state banks' financial health has deteriorated, since approximately 40% of their bad debts come from the tourism industry.

Two of these large state-owned banks, Société Tunisienne de Banque and Banque de l'Habitat, received 867 million dinars ($440 million) in government bailout money in August 2015. This recapitalization sparked protest from activists such as the NGO I Watch, which demanded that the results of a government audit of the three state-owned banks be made public. The main concern is that these state-owned banks were obliged to provide loans to allies of Ben Ali during his administration that have never been repaid and are counted as "gifts." Despite protests from Tunisian parliament members such as Hafedh Zouari and Sami Abbousaid for more transparency over the bailout funds and the state of the banks' finances, the bailout was approved by a large margin.

Following the state recapitalization, the IMF provided a $300 million emergency loan and the World Bank provided a $500 million loan, both with the goal of restructuring the state banks in the hopes of sparking economic growth. Finance minister Slim Chaker has promised to restructure the three state banks before the end of 2015.

== See also ==
- List of banks in Tunisia
