= Nejla Moalla =

Tunisian engineer and politician (born 1963)

- Born: 23 April 1963 (age 63)
- Education: Ecole Polytechnique of France
- Children: 3
- Parent: Mansour Moalla
- Engineering career
- Institutions: Paribas Bank
- Employer: Banque Internationale Arabe de Tunisie

Nejla Moalla Harrouch, born on 23 April 1963, is an engineer and a Tunisian politician. She occupied the position of Minister of Trade and Handicrafts from January 2014 until February 2015. Her successors are Ridha Lahouel for Trade and Selma Elloumi Rekik for Handicrafts.

== Biography ==
=== Education ===
She received her high school diploma in 1981 (Math - Science section) with honors in secondary school Carthage Presidency.

Between 1981 and 1983, she went to study in preparatory classes for engineering schools at Louis-le-Grand high school in Paris (France). In 1985, she obtained an engineering degree at the École polytechnique of France and in 1987 at the National School of Mines in Paris.

=== Professional career ===
In 1988, she became an analyst in the department of Industrial Affairs of Paribas Bank in Paris, and in 1989, analyst in charge of investment companies at Banque Internationale Arabe de Tunisie - BIAT.

Between 1990 and 1994, she was CEO of the companies Mehari Djerba Beach and Mehari Tabarka Beach.
From 1994 until 2006, she worked again for the BIAT as director of budget and management control, then as head of the credit department from 2006 to 2008, coordinator of trades redesign project of the information system between 2008 and 2012 and as manager of the department of project management and coordination of trades between 2012 and 2013.

After her position in the government, Nejla Moalla was nominated as CEO of BIAT Insurance.

=== Political career ===
In January 2014, she was nominated Minister of Trade and Handicrafts in the government of Mehdi Jomaa.

== Personal life ==
Nejla Moalla is married and has three children. Her father is Mansour Moalla; who occupied several ministerial posts during the time of Habib Bourguiba.
