= Mustapha Kamel Nabli =

Tunisian economist (born 1948)

- مصطفى كمال النابلي
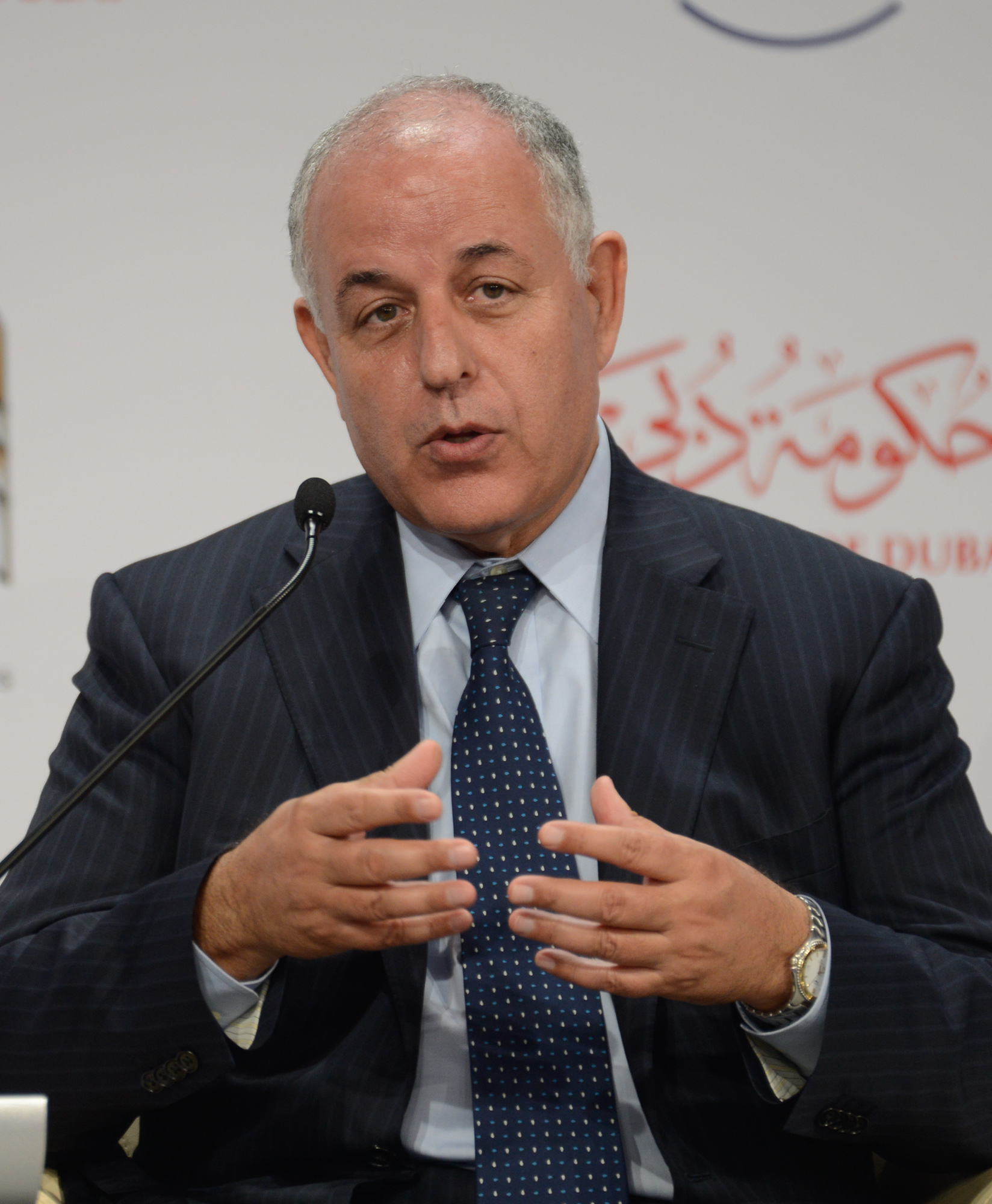

Governor of the Central Bank of Tunisia
- In office 17 January 2011 – 18 July 2012
- President: Fouad Mebazaa; Moncef Marzouki
- Preceded by: Taoufik Baccar
- Succeeded by: Chedly Ayari

Personal details
- Born: 10 February 1948 (age 78) Téboulba, Tunisia

Mustapha Kamel Nabli (Arabic: مصطفى كمال النابلي; born in 1948) is a Tunisian economist. He served as Governor of the Central Bank of Tunisia from January 2011 until July 2012.

== Biography ==
Born on February 10, 1948, in Téboulba, Tunisia, Nabli studied economics in Tunisia, where he received the Prize of the President of the Republic in June 1969 for his Bachelor in Economics. He received his master's degree and a PhD in economics at the University of California, Los Angeles. He also holds a degree from Tunis Ecole Nationale d’ Administration (ENA).

Professor of Economics at the Tunis University and member of Tunisian Academy of Sciences, Letters, and Arts; visiting professor, various universities in Canada, US, Belgium and France; international consultant. 1988–90, chairman, Tunis Stock Exchange. 1990–95, Minister of Economic Development and Minister of Planning and Regional Development of Tunisia; concurrently, 1994-1996: member of U.N. Secretary General High Level Group on “Development Strategy and Management of the Market Economy”. Economics Expert for the European Union and the Arab League. With World Bank: 1997, Senior Economic Adviser, Development Prospects, Development Economics; 1999–2010, Regional Chief Economist and Director, Social and Economic Development Group, Middle East and North Africa; 2010 - Jan. 2011, Senior Adviser to the World Bank Chief Economist. Jan. 2011 - July 2012, Governor of the Central Bank of Tunisia.

He entered the 2014 Presidential elections as an independent, but withdraw on November 17, 2014.

== Honours ==
- 2011 : Grand Cordon of the Order of the Republic of Tunisia.

== Published works ==
- Tunisia's Economic Development. Why Better than Most of the Middle East but Not East Asia (with Jeffrey B. Nugent), London / New York, Routledge, 2022
- J’y crois toujours : Au-delà de la débâcle...une Tunisie démocratique et prospère, Tunis, Sud éditions, 2019
- Natural Resources, Volatility and Inclusive Growth Perspectives from the Middle East and North Africa, Washington, International Monetary Fund, 2012
- The Great Recession and Developing Countries, New York, World Bank Publications, 2010
- Breaking the Barriers to Higher Economic Growth: Better Governance and Deeper Reforms in the Middle East and North Africa, New York, World Bank Publications, 2008
- Industrial Policy in the Middle East and North Africa: Rethinking the Role of the State, Cairo, The American University in Cairo Press, 2007
- Governance and Private Investment in the Middle East and North Africa, New York, World Bank Publications, 2006
- Trade, Investment, and Development in the Middle East and North Africa: Engaging With the World, New York, World Bank Publications, 2003
- MENA development report, New York, World Bank Publications, 2003
- Financial Integration, Vulnerabilities to Crisis, and EU Accession in Five Central European Countries, New York, World Bank Publications, 1999
- Development Strategy and Management of Market Economy, Oxford, Clarendon Press, 1997
- The New Institutional Economics and Development: Theory and Applications to Tunisia, London, Elsevier Science Ltd, 1989
- Actes du colloque coopération CEE-Maghreb, Tunis, Centre d'études, de recherches et de publication de la Faculté de droit et des sciences politiques et économiques, 1981
