= Ahmed Najib Chebbi =

Tunisian politician

- أحمد نجيب الشابي
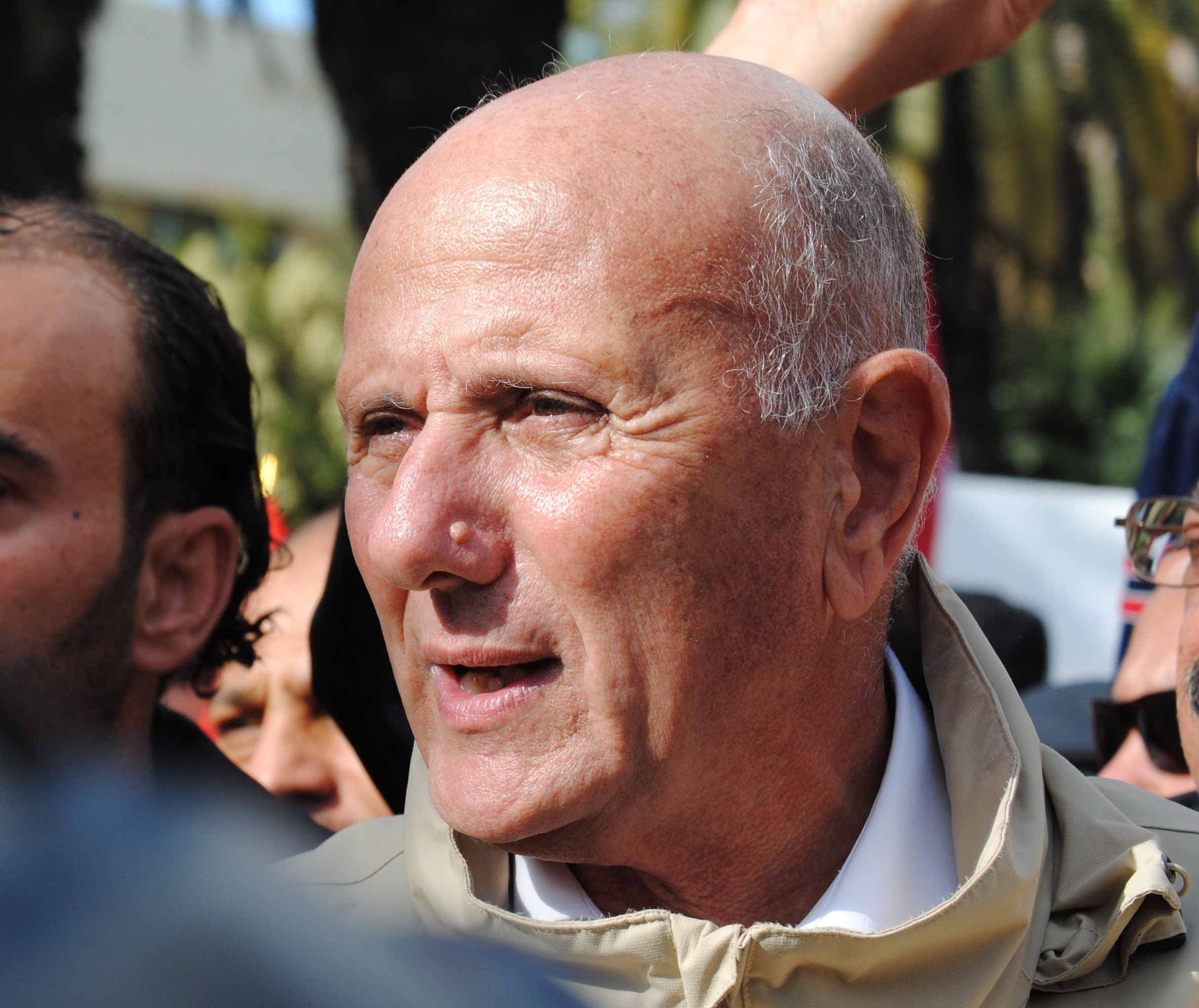

Regional Development Minister
- In office 17 January 2011 – 7 March 2011
- President: Fouad Mebazaa (Acting)
- Prime Minister: Mohamed Ghannouchi
- Preceded by: Ahmed Friaa
- Succeeded by: Abderrazak Zouari

Personal details
- Born: 30 July 1944 (age 81) Tunis, Tunisia
- Party: Republican Party
- Spouse: Safia Mestiri
- Children: 5
- Website: PDP Website (English)

Ahmed Najib Chebbi (Arabic: أحمد نجيب الشابي, French: Ahmed Néjib Chebbi) or simply Najib Chebbi (born 30 July 1944) is a Tunisian attorney and politician.

== Political activism ==
Chebbi is a prominent figure of the Tunisian opposition movement; in 1983, he founded the Democratic Progressive Party, which gained legal recognition in 1988. He is currently the leader of the Democratic Progressive Party. In 2006, Maya Jribi became the party's secretary-general, the first woman to hold such office in Tunisia. In 2009 Chebbi attempted to run as a candidate for President of Tunisia but was barred from running.

In response to former authoritarian President Zine El Abidine Ben Ali's statement during the 2010–2011 Tunisian protests promising 300,000 new jobs would be created and criticizing the protests, Chebbi said that despite official claims of police firing in self-defense that "the demonstrations were non-violent and the youths were claiming their rights to jobs" and that "the funeral processions [for those killed on January 9] turned into demonstrations, and the police fired [at] the youths who were at these .. processions." He then criticised Ben Ali's comments as the protesters were "claiming their civil rights, and there is no terrorist act...no religious slogans," while accusing Ben Ali of "looking for scapegoats." He further criticised the additional jobs offered as mere "promises."

Following the ousting of Ben Ali on 14 January 2011, Prime Minister Mohammed Ghannouchi contacted Chebbi and other opposition leaders in hopes of creating a coalition government until elections can be held. Chebbi "said he demanded parliamentary elections be held within six or seven months."

On 15 January 2011, Chebbi was noted by Al Jazeera as one of three potential successors (the only one mentioned not to have been part of the Ben Ali government) to become President of Tunisia following the proposed 2011 general election to occur within six months. It noted however that "if he is to be a contender in the next presidential election, he will need to widen his appeal."

Chebbi was named Minister of Regional Development in the new government on 17 January 2011, but he resigned in March 2011 after less than two months in his post.

== Repression ==
In June 2023, Chebbi was suspected of undermining "the external security of the State". He appeared before the investigating judge of the Tunis anti-terrorism unit.. In 2025, he was sentenced to 12 years' imprisonment and was arrested. Chebbi's arrest and sentencing were among the motivations for the intensification of Tunisian protests in late 2025.

== See also ==
- Democratic Progressive Party (Tunisia)
- 18 October Coalition for Rights and Freedoms
