= Rachid Sfar =

Tunisian politician (1933-2023)

- رشيد صفر
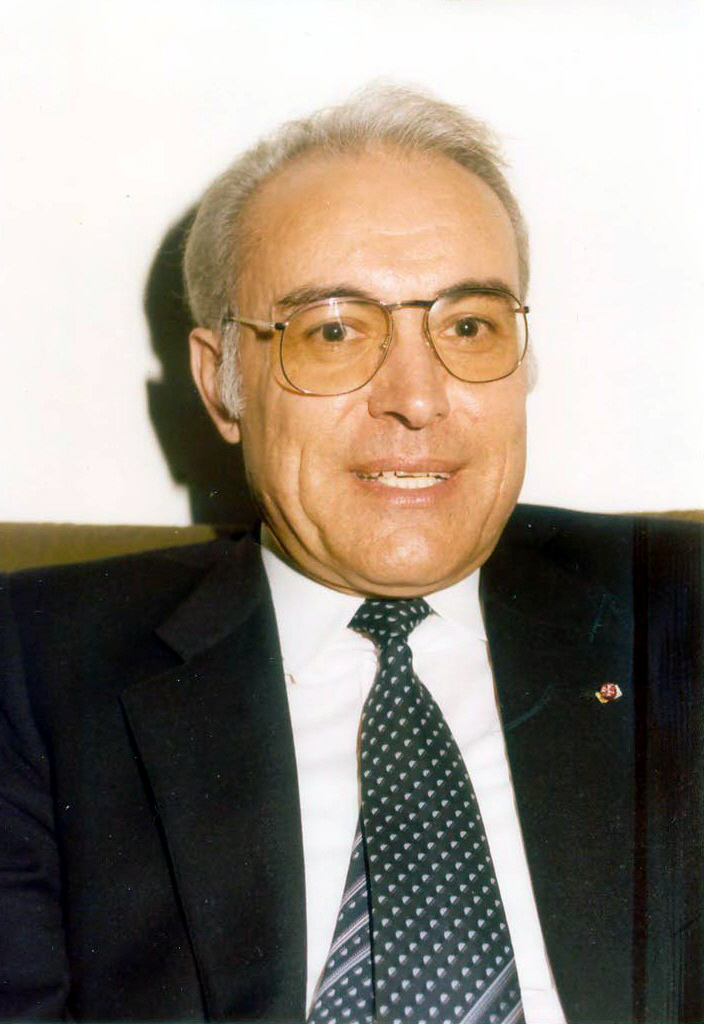
- Sfar in 1988

Prime Minister of Tunisia
- In office 8 July 1986 – 2 October 1987
- President: Habib Bourguiba
- Preceded by: Mohammed Mzali
- Succeeded by: Zine El Abidine Ben Ali

Minister of Finance
- In office 28 April 1986 – 8 July 1986
- President: Habib Bourguiba
- Prime Minister: Mohamed Mzali
- Preceded by: Salah Ben M'barka
- Succeeded by: Ismail Khelil

Minister of Defence
- In office 12 September 1979 – 24 April 1980
- President: Habib Bourguiba
- Prime Minister: Hédi Nouira
- Preceded by: Abdallah Farhat
- Succeeded by: Slaheddine Baly

Personal details
- Born: 11 September 1933 Mahdia, French Tunisia
- Died: 20 July 2023 (aged 89) Mahdia, Tunisia
- Party: Socialist Destourian Party (1964–1988); Democratic Constitutional Rally (1988–2011)
- Parents: Tahar Sfar (father); Salha Sfar (mother)

Rachid Sfar (Arabic: رشيد صفر; 11 September 1933 – 20 July 2023) was a Tunisian politician who served as prime minister under the presidency of Habib Bourguiba.

== Early life ==
Sfar was born in Mahdia, the ancient Fatimite capital of Tunisia. He was the son of the Destourian leader Tahar Sfar, an associate of Bourguiba and co-founder of the Neo-Destourian Tunisian Nationalist Party in 1934. Sfar's ancestors were among the first people of Turkish origin to arrive in Tunisia during the Ottoman rule, they had arrived from Anatolia and Macedonia.

After completing his secondary studies at the lycée in the city of Sfax, Rachid Sfar pursued advanced studies in humanities, law, and economics in Tunis and in Paris. In Paris, he studied at the Ecole Nationale des Impôts from 1958 to 1959.

== Political career ==
In the newly independent Tunisia, Sfar assumed various administrative responsibilities, notably in the Ministry of Finances: Director general of Taxation, Director General of Economic and Financial Relations, Director General for the Control of Tobacconists, and Secretary General of the Ministry of Finance. In December 1977, Bourguiba called upon him to direct the Ministry of Industry of Mines and the Ministry of Energy. In 1980, he was director of the Ministry of Defense, in 1982 the Ministry of Public Health, and from 1984 to 1986 the Ministry for the Economy.

In July 1986, before the deterioration of the financial situation in the country, President Bourguiba discharged his Prime Minister Mohamed Mzali and tasked Sfar with implementing a structural adjustment plan as Prime Minister. Sfar re-established Tunisia's macro-economic equilibria by passing in the National Assembly the "Loi de finances complémentaire" (the supplemental finances law), by devaluing the dinar by 10%, and by obtaining support from the International Monetary Fund and the World Bank to rebuild currency reserves and re-establish credit.

President Habib Bourguiba fired Sfar on 3 October 1987. Bourguiba named his Interior Minister Zine El Abidine Ben Ali as Sfar's replacement. On 7 November 1987, invoking a provision of the Tunisian Constitution, the aged and infirm President Habib Bourguiba was declared incapable of executing the duties of his office. He was succeeded by his Prime Minister Ben Ali, who took the oath of office the same day before an extraordinary meeting of the National Assembly.

== Death ==
Rachid Sfar died on 20 July 2023, at the age of 89.
