= United Nations Mission in Ethiopia and Eritrea =

United Nations peace-keeping mission

United Nations Office in Ethiopia and Eritrea

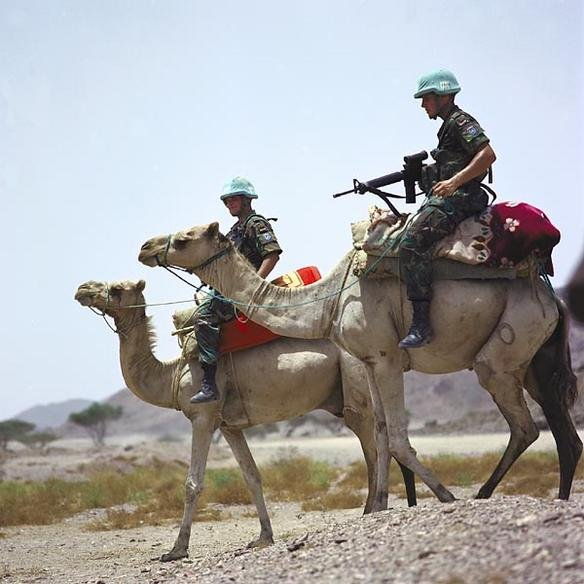
- Dutch UN soldiers on camel in Eritrea
- Abbreviation: UNMEE
- Formation: 31 July 2000
- Dissolved: 31 July 2008
- Type: Peacekeeping Mission
- Legal status: Completed
- Head: Azouz Ennifar
- Parent organization: United Nations Security Council
- Website: Web archive of former UNMEE website

The United Nations Mission in Ethiopia and Eritrea (UNMEE) was established by the United Nations Security Council in July 2000 to monitor a ceasefire in the border war that began in 1998 between Ethiopia and Eritrea. First military troops Netherlands - Canadian battalion 'NECBAT' arrived and established bases in the region in December 2000.

The mission was formally abandoned in July 2008 after experiencing serious difficulties in sustaining its troops due to fuel stoppages and after due consideration of remaining options.

== History ==
On July 31, 2000, the Security Council adopted Resolution 1312 and established UNMEE. The mission was put in place in order to formally demarcate the border between the two countries. The border followed the route as declared by an international commission in The Hague but Ethiopia refused to accept the ruling, despite originally agreeing to binding arbitration.

The mission maintained headquarters in Asmara (Eritrea), and Addis Ababa (Ethiopia), and consisted of 1,676 military personnel, amid high tensions between the two countries. About 1,500 of these peacekeepers were from the Indian Army. In addition, there were about 147 international civilians, 202 local civilians and 67 UN Volunteers. Their area of responsibility was a buffer zone 25 kilometers (15 miles) wide on the Eritrean side of the Ethiopian-Eritrean border. There have been recorded 20 fatalities: 13 military personnel, 3 international civilian personnel and 4 local civilian personnel. The approved budget for the mission between 1 July 2007 and 30 June 2008 was $118.99 million.

The border between Ethiopia and Eritrea has remained closed and thousands of people live in refugee camps while perhaps a million people remain displaced. In October 2005, the Eritrean government restricted UNMEE helicopter flights along the border and demanded the reduction of the UNMEE force by 300 staffers. Eritrea also restricted movement of ground patrols inside the buffer zone. United Nations Security Council Resolution 1640 in November 2005 threatened sanctions on both parties if there was no resolution.

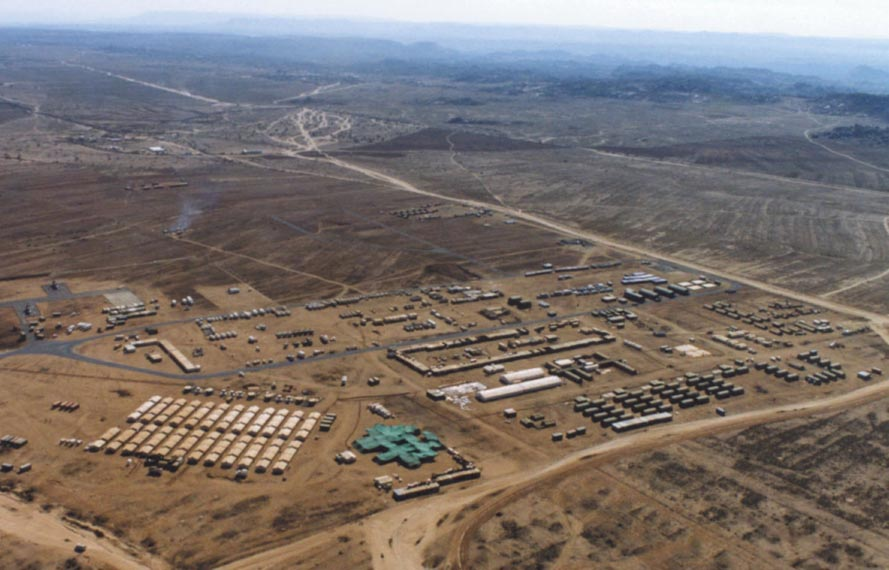
The UNMEE NECBAT Logistics base at Dekemhare 2000/2001

In September 2007, United Nations special envoy to the Horn of Africa, Kjell Magne Bondevik, warned that war could resume between Ethiopia and Eritrea over their border conflict. In November, Eritrea accepted the border line demarcated by the international boundary commission, which was rejected by Ethiopia. In January 2008 the UN extended the mandate of peacekeepers on Ethiopia-Eritrea border for six months, and UN Security Council demanded Eritrea lift fuel restrictions imposed on UN peacekeepers at the Eritrea-Ethiopia border area. Eritrea declined, saying troops must leave border, and in February the UN began pulling out the 1,700-strong peacekeeper force due to lack of fuel supplies following Eritrean government restrictions. In April, UN Secretary-General Ban Ki Moon warned of the likelihood of new war between Ethiopia and Eritrea if peacekeeping mission is withdrawn completely, and outlines options for the future of the UN mission in the two countries. In May, Eritrea called on UN to terminate the peacekeeping mission.

The mission was ended with effect from 31 July 2008 with a UNSC resolution adopted on 30 July 2008. Peacekeepers had been driven from the border zone by Eritrea by February 2008, and Ethiopia had refused to accept a binding International Court of Justice ruling on the border issue. There are fears that this may set a precedent to show that a country can force out UN peacekeepers. Analysts also fear a new war may erupt between Ethiopia and Eritrea over the border dispute. Eritrea has, however, tried to ally fears over a new war.

== Staff and forces ==
On 30 November 2007, UNMEE had a total of 1,676 military personnel, including 1,464 troops and 212 military observers, supported by 147 international civilians, 202 local civilians and 67 UN Volunteers.

- Special Representative of the Secretary-General and Head of Mission:Azouz Ennifar (Tunisia)
- Deputy Special Representatives:
- Force Commander: Major-General Mohammad Taisir Masadeh (Jordan)

Contributors of military personnel:

Africa

- Algeria
- Gambia
- Ghana
- Kenya
- Namibia
- Nigeria
- South Africa
- Tanzania
- Tunisia
- Zambia

Americas

- Canada
- Bolivia
- Brazil
- Guatemala
- Paraguay
- Peru
- United States
- Uruguay

Asia

- Bangladesh
- China
- India
- Jordan
- Kyrgyzstan
- Malaysia
- Nepal
- Pakistan
- Philippines
- Sri Lanka

Europe

- Austria
- Bosnia and Herzegovina
- Bulgaria
- Croatia
- Czech Republic
- Slovakia
- Denmark
- Finland
- France
- Germany
- Greece
- Ireland
- Italy
- Netherlands
- Norway
- Poland
- Romania
- Russia
- Spain
- Sweden
- Ukraine

== See also ==
- Eritrean–Ethiopian War
