= Fadhel Abdelkefi =

Tunisian financier and politician

- فاضل عبد الكافي
- Born: 1970
- Education: Pantheon-Sorbonne University
- Parent: Ahmed Abdelkefi

Fadhel Abdelkefi (Arabic: فاضل عبد الكافي), also known as Fadhel Abd Kefi, is a Tunisian financier and politician. He served as the Tunisian Investment Minister until May 1, 2017, when he was appointed as the acting Minister of Finance.

== Early life ==
His father, Ahmed Abdelkefi founded the first leasing company based in Tunisia in 1984. Fadhel was born in 1970. He graduated from the Pantheon-Sorbonne University with a degree in economics.

== Career ==
Abdelkefi joined his father's company, Tunisie Valeurs, in 1994. By 2005, he was its CEO. By 2013, he was also the head of Integra Partners. He was also the non-executive chairman of the Bourse des valeurs mobilières de Tunis (BVMT).

Abdelkefi was appointed as the Tunisian Investment Minister in November 2016. During his tenure, he encouraged private investment in Tunisia. On May 1, 2017, he succeeded Lamia Zribi as the acting Finance Minister. On 18 August 2017, he resigns acting Finance Minister.

Abdelkefi resigned from the presidency of Afek Tounes on 19 October 2023.
