= Union des travailleurs tunisiens =

Tunisian trade union organisation

Union des travailleurs tunisiens ('Union of Tunisian Workers') was a central trade union organisation in Tunisia. Founded in 1956, it was split from the UGTT. UTT was founded by Habib Achour, who opposed the policies of UGTT General Secretary Ahmed Ben Sallah (which included radical nationalizations and a merger between the UGTT and the political party structure). However, as Ben Sallah resigned in December 1956, discussions on a merger between UGTT and UTT were initiated. A reunification congress was held in September 1957.
