= Ahmed Abdelkefi =

Tunisian economist and businessman

- Born: 1 March 1941 (age 84); Tunis, Tunisia
- Occupation: Businessman
- Children: Fadhel Abdelkefi

Ahmed Abdelkefi (born 1 March, 1941) is a Tunisian economist and businessman. He is the founder, president, and director of Tuninvest Finance Group as well as the founder and former chairman of Tunisie Leasing Group and Tunisie Valeurs.

== Early life ==
Abdelkefi was born in Tunis on 1 March, 1941; his father was a farmer and merchant, originally from Sfax, and his mother was of Turkish origin. He spent his childhood in the medina of Tunis and, after studying at primary Sadiki College, he enrolled at the Lycee Carnot where he earned a Bachelor of Science. In 1959, he left for France to attend the University of Paris I where he graduated with degree in economics in 1963. The following year he was admitted to the Ecole Nationale d'Administration.

== Career ==
In 1967, Abdelkefi returned to Tunisia and began a career in administration, the governorate of Sidi Bouzid at first and then in a second step, the Ministry of Economy and Finance, where he heads the department of foreign investment. Appointed in 1973 as the first CEO of the Society for the Study and Development of North-Sousse, he immediately took care of the development of Port El Kantaoui which became the cornerstone of the first integrated resort in Tunisia. He left his post in 1978 to go work, for five years, within the Abu Dhabi Fund for Arab Economic Development as an advisor to the chairman.

Abdelkefi launched the first leasing company based in Tunisia in 1984. In 1994 he founded the Tuninvest Finance Group (TFG), the first Tunisian company specialized in private equity. The fund Tuninvest is also present in Morocco since 2000 under the name Marocinvest and since 2006 in Algeria under the name Maghrebinvest. The fund is also present through its subsidiary Capital Partners Africinvest Saharan Africa, where he partnered with Cauris in West Africa, Fidelity in Ghana, and Africa and Central CENAINVEST IBTC in Nigeria. By 2005 Abdelkefi created the Tunisia LLD, which is the first company specialized in fleet management. Furthermore, he is currently president of TLG Financial Group and the Integra Partners grouping Tunisie Valeurs Tuninvest and Finance Group.

He joined the board of directors of the Central Bank of Tunisia in September 2012.

== Personal life ==
Abdelkefi is married and has two children.
