= Ahmed Ben Salah =

Tunisian politician (1926–2020)

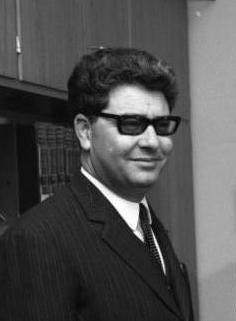
In 1966.

Ahmed Ben Salah (Arabic: أحمد بن صالح) (13 January 1926 – 16 September 2020) was a Tunisian politician and trade union leader. His power and influence peaked between 1957 and 1969 when he was able to implement his ideas for a planned economy, holding simultaneously several key ministerial posts.

== Life ==
=== Early years ===
Ahmed Ben Salah was born at Moknine, a mid-sized town in the coastal Sahel region, located between Monastir to the north and Mahdia to the south, in a region that during the run-up to decolonisation came to be known for nationalism. He undertook his secondary education at the prestigious Sadiki College in Tunis, completing his schooling in France during the 1940s.

His schooling finished, he entered the world of liberation politics, becoming president of the youth wing of the Destourian party (jeunesse scolaire destourienne) and in 1947, while still in France, working to ensure liaison between the Neo Destour nationalist movement in Tunisia, their exiled leader, Habib Bourguiba, in Cairo, and Moncef Bey, the former bey/king, who was living out his final years under surveillance in Pau (southwest France). Ben Salah returned to Tunisia in 1948 and embarked on a career in the trades union movement, joining the General Labour Union (Union Générale Tunisienne du Travail / UGTT) in 1948.

During the later 1940s, the UGTT was a member of the Athens based World Federation of Trade Unions which by the end of the decade was losing adherents internationally. In 1951 the UGTT switched to the recently formed International Confederation of Free Trade Unions (ICFTU) which, in the context of the cold war rivalries of the time, was more western in its orientation. For Ben Salah and the UGTT, membership of the ICFTU offered the prospect of a wider and more influential audience for the ambitions of the Tunisian nationalists.

=== UGTT Secretary General ===
The international role Ben Salah acquired through the ICFTU increased his profile in Tunisia, and he was elected general secretary of the UGTT shortly after the assassination of Farhat Hached on 5 December 1952, roughly eighteen months before the Carthage meeting of 31 July 1954 at which the French president recognised Tunisia's right to internal autonomy.

During 1956, Ben Salah did not hold back from criticism of Tunisia's emerging political elite, focused on the Neo Destour movement, which he accused of serving the interests of the "grande bourgeoisie". Keen to preserve unity, Habib Bourguiba, who was elected to the presidency of the constitutional assembly on 8 April, asserted that egalitarian claims should not be allowed to degenerate into pressure from the dispossessed to impoverish the wealthy.

Ben Salah's powerful personality set up a concern with the Neo Destourians that his control over the UGTT might lead to the creation of a socialist party outside the Neo Destourian consensus. The concern was followed by a rapid growth within the UGTT in pressure to remove Ben Salah. Matters reached a head at the UGTT congress in September 1956 when activists orchestrated by Bourguiba penetrated the union administrative commission and, backed by several regional unions, disaffiliated from the UGTT, grouping themselves instead into a rival body, the Tunisian Labour Union ("Union des travailleurs tunisiens"). The Neo-Destourians also applied pressure on UGTT member unions which led to the enforced resignation of union General Secretary Ben Salah in December 1956. He was replaced by Ahmed Tlili.

=== Government: heavy lifting ===
Excluded from his union role, Ben Salah was appointed minister of public health on 29 July 1957. The social affairs portfolio was added on 6 May 1958, and he retained the combined ministerial role till 3 January 1961.

During 1960, with foreign investment drying up and a flight of capital out of the country, Habib Bourguiba sensed a decline in the popular enthusiasm for his régime that had accompanied independence. The president now declared himself in favour of a planned economy and then of socialism. After a destabilising succession of ministerial appointments, in January 1961 Ahmed Ben Salah was appointed Minister for Planning and Minister of Finance. He retained both posts till September 1969.

Co-opted in this way into the Neo Destourian political establishment, Ben Salah returned to the underlying precepts of the economic report that he had presented to the sixth UGTT congress back in 1956, and prepared a "ten year plan" (1962–1971), which was coupled with a more immediate three term plan with the objective of putting in place the necessary structures. The ten-year plan, with a preamble that affirmed Tunisia's choice of Socialism, was intended to "decolonise the national economy" by integrating the colonial sector and "Tunisification" of residual "foreign enclaves" in the economy.

In order to promote Tunisian self-sufficiency, the plan restricted foreign investment to below 50% net of the total. The Ben Salah strategy expanded along with his ministerial ambit which included the ministry of education from 1967 and also extended into control of the important agriculture sector. It was in agriculture that he imposed some of his most far reaching reforms, notably with the creation in 1962 of production co-operatives, each grouped around a number of selected farmer-peasants.

However, it was rapid changes in agriculture and its intensive mechanisation, which aggravated the situation of the peasants outside the system and those without land, while even inside the co-operative structures discontent mounted, resulting from excessive sclerotic bureaucracy undermined efficiency and even led to late payment of wages. Popular discontent began to reach out beyond the agriculture sector and the ten-year plan rolled out.

By 1968, the entire commercial sector was affected, and in January 1969 street violence broke out, notably at Ouerdanin where a dozen demonstrators lost their lives in confrontations with the forces of law and order. An alliance of discontent covering the commercial and agriculture sectors joined together to oppose Ben Salah who also lost the support of the dispossessed poorer peasants.

=== Fall ===
The system based around co-operatives had failed. When it came, the fall of Ben Salah was rapid. On 3 August 1969, he was dismissed, formally stripped of his ministerial posts the next month. On 22 September 1969, the president announced that the "socialist experience" was at an end ("la fin de l'expérience socialiste"). Ben Salah was also excluded from what had been renamed in 1964 as the Socialist Destourian Party, and had his seat in the national legislature withdrawn. He was accused of having abused the president's trust and having exploited, during the last few years, the president's poor health. (President Bourguiba would remain in office for nearly another twenty years, till 1987, and died only in 2000). On 25 May 1970 he was brought before the High Court. The charges, which implied presidential input, covered "High treason, lack of trust in the head of state, financial and administrative irregularities, falsification of statistics and political manoeuverings preparatory to a seizure of power" ("haute trahison, manque de confiance envers le chef de l'État, irrégularités financières et administratives, falsification de statistiques et manœuvres politiques en vue d'accaparer le pouvoir"). He was condemned to ten years of hard labour.

=== Exile: long but not unbroken ===
Ben Salah managed to escape from his prison in Tunis on 4 February 1973, and fled to Algeria where he was granted political asylum. Despite everything, he remained politically active. He founded the "Popular Unity Movement" ("Mouvement de l'unité populaire" - later the "Popular Unity Party"). In May 1988, one year after the régime change that brought a new president to power in Tunisia, Ben Salah received a pardon and returned to Tunisia after a fifteen-year exile. On 21 August 1989 he submitted an application to register the "Popular Unity Party", but the application was ignored. In September 1990, he found himself obliged to go back into exile, returning home definitively only in September 2000.

On 12 February 2011, following a further régime change, a renewed application to register the "Popular Unity Party" was submitted, and on 8 March 2011 the party which he served as General Secretary was finally authorised to undertake political activity. Ben Salah became the party's president on 13 May 2012.

== Honours ==
=== Tunisian national honours ===
- Grand Cordon of the Order of Independence (1965)

=== Foreign honors ===
- Algeria: Medal of Honor of the Republic of Algeria (3 January 2013)

== Publications ==
- Témoignage d'Ahmed Ben Salah sur son parcours national et international, Zaghouan, Fondation Temimi pour la recherche scientifique et l'information, 2002.
- Pour rétablir la vérité : réformes et développement en Tunisie, 1961-1969, Tunis, Cérès, 2008.
