= Lamia Zribi =

Tunisian politician

Lamia Zribi is a Tunisian politician. She served as the Minister of Finance until May 1, 2017, when she was succeeded by Fadhel Abd Kefi. She was criticized for failing to prevent the fall of the Tunisian dinar and the continued growth of public sector spending.

== Biography ==
Born in 1961 in Medjez el-Bab, Lamia Zribi comes from Zaghouan governorate. She graduated from the Faculty of Law and Political Science and Economics of the University of Tunis, where she obtained a master's degree in economics in 1983 and joined the National School of Administration, where she obtained in 1993 a degree of completion of higher studies.

In 2001, she became Director of External Expenditures at the Ministry of Development and International Cooperation and, until 2008, served as Director General of Forecasting.

She is also the CEO of TradeNet (TTN). On May 10, 2016, she was appointed by the Minister of Finance as CEO of Small and Medium-Sized Corporate Finance Bank to replace Souhir Taktak.

On February 2, 2015, she was appointed Secretary of State to the Minister of Development, Investment and International Cooperation Yassine Brahim in the government of Habib Essid.

On August 20, 2016, she is appointed Minister of Finance in the government of Youssef Chahed. She is the first woman to access this position in Tunisia.

On April 30, 2017, she was dismissed as Minister and replaced on an interim basis by the Minister of Development, Investment and International Cooperation, Fadhel Abdelkefi. On August 18, she was named president of the National Council of Statistics.

== See also ==
Zribi(Tunisian surname)
