= Fethia Mzali =

Tunisian politician (1927–2018)

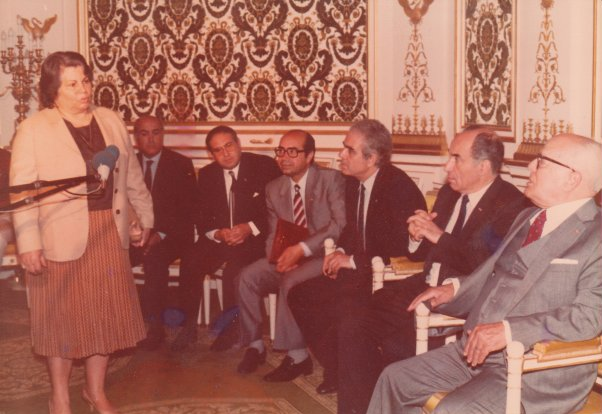
Fethia Mokhtar Mzali in 1984

Fethia Mokhtar Mzali (Arabic: فتحيّة مزالي) (6 April 1927 – 12 February 2018) was a Tunisian teacher and politician who became one of the country's first two female ministers in 1983. Her husband, Mohammed Mzali, served as the country's Prime Minister from 1980 to 1986.

== Early life and education ==
Fethia Mokhtar was born on 6 April 1927 in Tunis. She attended primary school at a Muslim girls' school and then the Bardo girls school. Her secondary schooling was interrupted by World War II, but completed in 1942 at Armand Fallières High School in Nérac in 1947. She obtained a degree in philosophy from the Sorbonne in Paris in 1952.

== Career ==
Mzali was a teacher and then headmistress at the Teachers' College in Tunis. She was a member Destour and participated in the demonstrations from 1950–1955 that led to independence.

In 1956, after Tunisian independence, Mzali was one of the founders of the National Union of Women of Tunisia. In 1974, she was appointed president of the organisation, a post she held until 1986. However, her appointment under President Habib Bourguiba was criticised for contributing to the women's movement in Tunisia languishing under his influence.

In 1957, Mzali was elected as a municipal councillor for the city of Tunis, serving a three-year term. She was first woman in Tunisia to give a speech about birth control in 1959. She joined the Central Committee of the Socialist Destourian Party in 1974 and was appointed a member of its governing body in 1979. She was elected to the Chamber of Deputies as the deputy for the regions of Kairouan, Tunis and Bizerte in 1974 and 1981. She was elected vice-president of the National Assembly each year from 1980 to 1984.

On 1 November 1983, Mzali was appointed Minister for Family and Women in the government of her husband Prime Minister Mohammed Mzali. Souad Yaacoubi was appointed minister of public health at the same time, making the two women the first to serve in the country's cabinet. Mzali was dismissed from her position in June 1986 after her husband's dismissal from the ruling party's administration. They fled the country for France, and in April 1987 Mohammed Mzali was convicted in absentia of abuse of social property and unlawful enrichment. The conviction was annulled in 2002, allowing their return to Tunisia.

== Awards and honours ==
In 1978, Mzali accepted the United Nations Prize in the Field of Human Rights on behalf of the National Union of Tunisian Women. She also received decorations from the governments of France, Finland and Senegal.

== Personal life ==
Mzali met Mohammed Mzali while studying in Paris and they were married in 1950. They had six children. Mzali died on 12 February 2018 at the age of 90.
