= Banque Internationale Arabe de Tunisie =

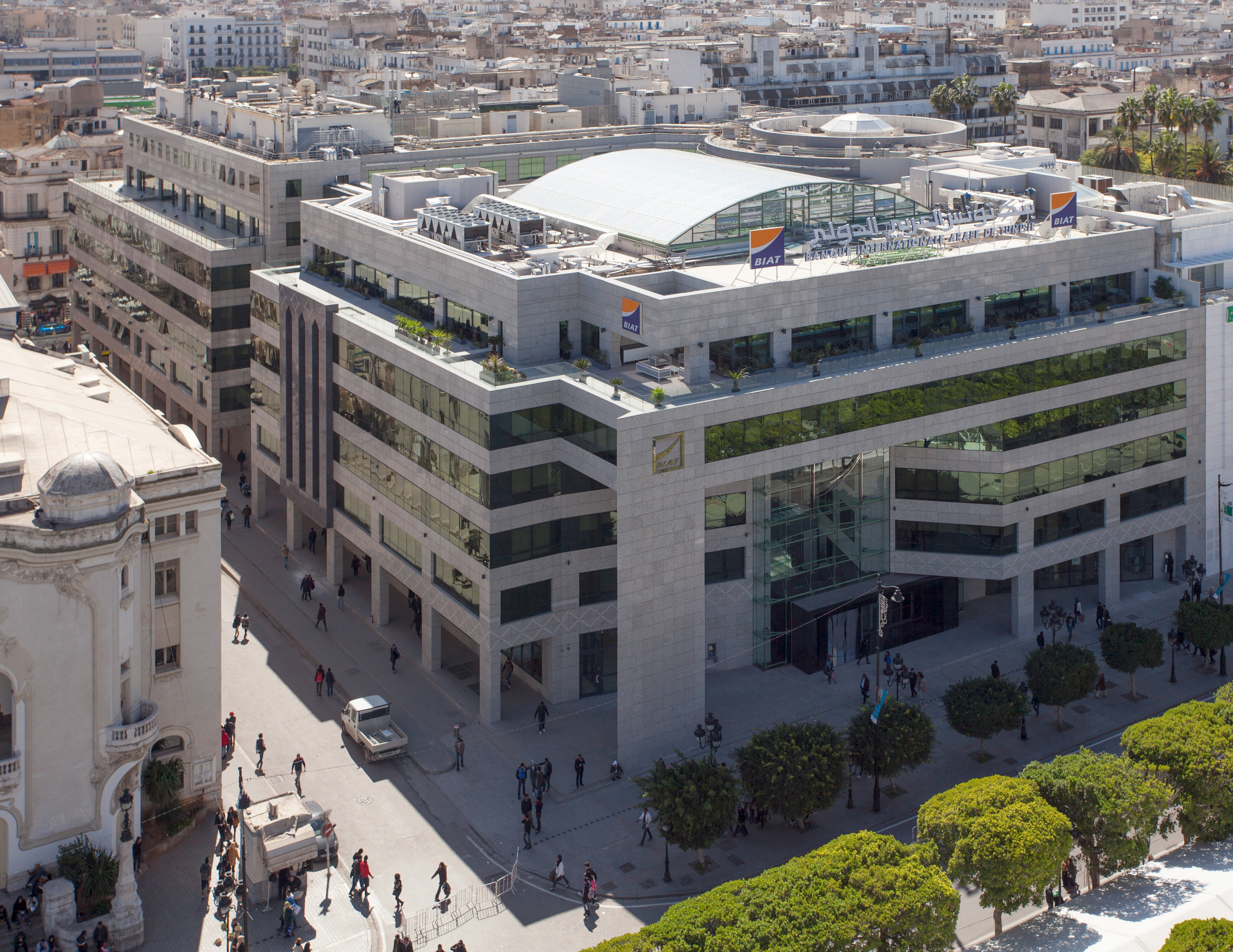
Banque Internationale Arabe de Tunisie

Banque Internationale Arabe de Tunisie (BIAT) is the largest private sector bank in Tunisia. It is listed on the Tunisian Stock Exchange (Bourse de Tunis).

== Overview ==
The Banque Internationale Arabe de Tunisie was founded by Mansour Moalla in 1976, as a result of a merger of the Tunisian branches of the Société Marseillaise de Crédit and the British Bank of the Middle East. It is headquartered in Tunis, Tunisia. It has 185 offices in Tunisia and 1 office in Libya. It announced in 2007 that it would open additional branches in Algeria and Morocco.
