= Hakim Ben Hammouda =

Tunisian economist and politician (born 1961)

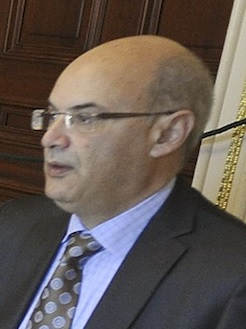
- Ben Hammouda in 2014

Minister of Economy and Finance
- In office 29 January 2014 – 6 February 2015
- President: Moncef Marzouki
- Prime Minister: Mehdi Jomaa
- Preceded by: Elyes Fakhfakh
- Succeeded by: Slim Chaker

Personal details
- Born: 7 August 1961 (age 65) Jemmal, Monastir Governorate, Tunisia
- Party: Independent
- Education: Pierre Mendès-France University

Hakim Ben Hammouda (born 7 August 1961) is a Tunisian economist and was appointed the interim Finance Minister of Tunisia by the Prime Minister Mehdi Jomaa. He has previously worked with the African Development Bank.

== Biography ==
He works for the United Nations Development Program and then joins the Economic Commission for Africa, as director of the office in Central Africa (2001-2003), director of the trade and regional integration division (2003-2006), economist Chief and Director of Trade, Finance and Economic Development (2006-2008). He then became Director of the Training Institute and Division of Technical Cooperation at the World Trade Organization (2008-2011) and Special Advisor to the President of the African Development Bank in 2011.

He regularly teaches international economics and development economics in several universities. At the African Union (AU) Summit, held in Accra in July 2007, he is appointed by the current AU Chair, John Kufuor, as a member of the "Panel of Eminent Africans" composed of thirteen high-level personalities including former ECA Executive Secretary Adebayo Adedeji, and former AU Special Envoy to Mauritania Vijay Makane. This panel's mission is to audit the organization and propose "strategies for its reinforcement"; the audit report is submitted to the AU Heads of State at the Addis Ababa Summit in January 2008.
