= Ministry of Regional Development (Tunisia) =

Government minister of Tunisia

The Ministry of Regional Development of Tunisia is a cabinet-level governmental agency in Tunisia. The position of Regional Development Minister leads the agency and has been held by Democratic Progressive Party leader, Ahmed Najib Chebbi, since 17 January 2011 following the 2010-2011 Tunisian Protests.
