= Taoufik Baccar =

Tunisian politician

Taoufik Baccar (Arabic: توفيق بكار, born 4 July 1950) is a Tunisian politician. He was the governor of the Central Bank of Tunisia from 2004 to 2011.

== Biography ==
Baccar was born on born 4 July 1950. In 1995, he was appointed Tunisia's Minister of Economic Development, becoming Minister of Finance in 1999. Subsequently, he became the Governor of the Central Bank of Tunisia.
