= Central Bank of Tunisia =

Tunisian central bank

Coordinates: 36°48′13″N 10°11′07″E

Central Bank of Tunisia البنك المركزي التونسي Banque Centrale de Tunisie

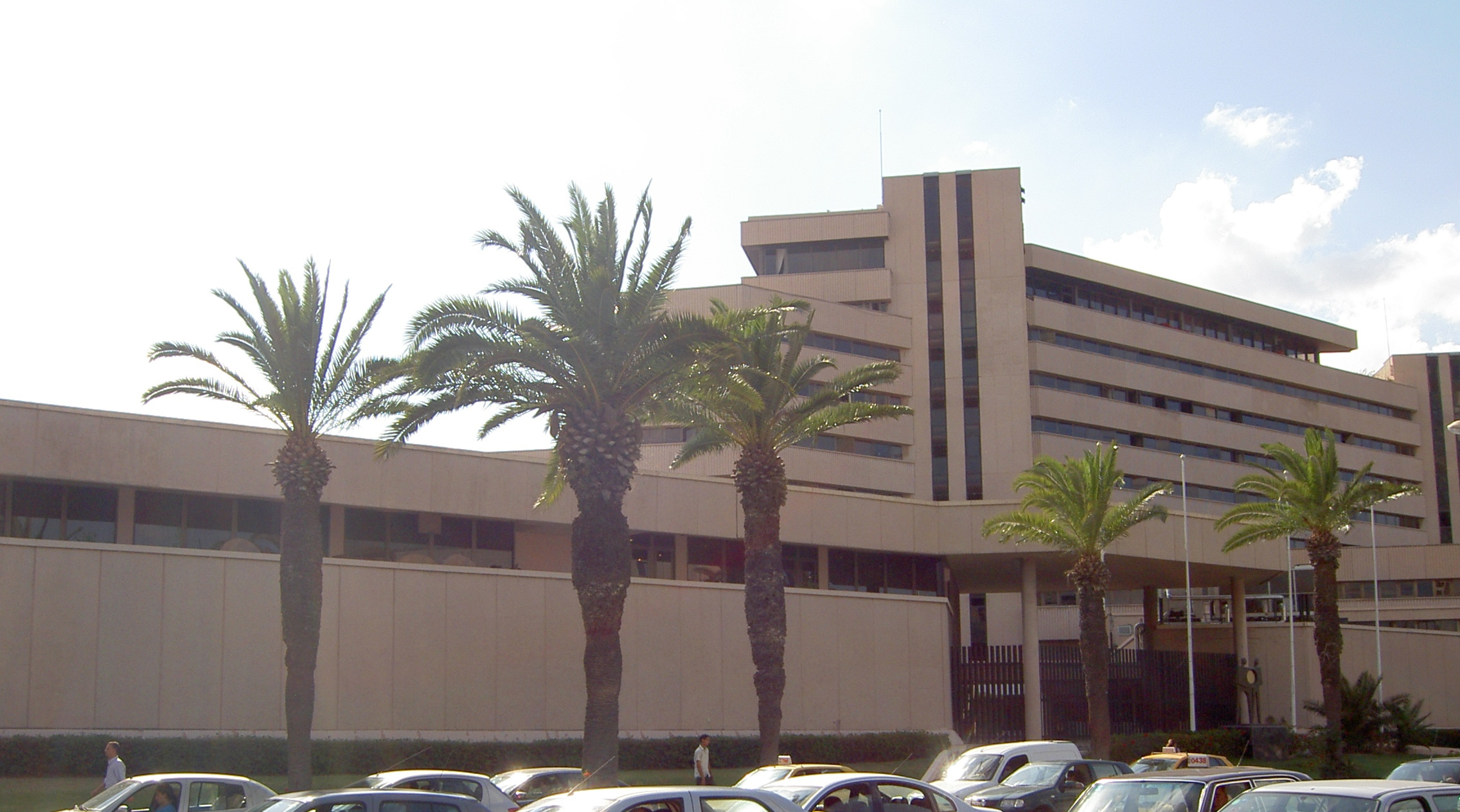
- Headquarters: Tunis
- Established: 19 September 1958 (legal); 3 November 1958 (began operations)
- Ownership: 100% state ownership
- Governor: Fethi Zouhair Nouri
- Central bank of: Tunisia
- Currency: Tunisian Dinar; TND (ISO 4217)
- Reserves: $8.6 billion
- Website: bct.gov.tn

The Central Bank of Tunisia (Arabic: البنك المركزي التونسي, French: Banque Centrale de Tunisie, BCT) is the central bank of Tunisia. The bank is in Tunis and its current governor is Marouane Abassi, who replaced Chedly Ayari on 16 February 2018.

== History ==
Tunisia gained independence in 1956. The Central Bank of Tunisia was formed two years later in 1958. In December 1958 the newly created Tunisian dinar was disconnected from the French franc. The bank maintains a Money Museum which includes a collection of recovered Carthaginian coins.

Tunisia had a historically low inflation. The Tunisian Dinar was less volatile in 2000–2010 than the currencies of its oil-importing neighbors, Egypt and Morocco. Inflation was 4.9% in fiscal year 2007–08 and 3.5% in fiscal year 2008–09.

== Operations ==
The BCT has 12 branch banks.

== Governors ==
Since its foundation, the following governors have succeeded at the head of the institution:

- 30 September 1958 – 9 November 1970: Hédi Nouira
- 10 November 1970 – 18 February 1972: Ali Zouaoui
- 4 March 1972 – 7 May 1980: Mohamed Ghenima
- 8 May 1980 – 11 July 1980: Abdelaziz Mathari
- 12 July 1980 – 14 March 1986: Moncef Belkhodja
- 15 March 1986 – 26 October 1987: Mohamed Skhiri
- 27 October 1987 – 2 March 1990: Ismaïl Khelil
- 3 March 1990 – 22 January 2001: Mohamed El Béji Hamda
- 23 January 2001 – 13 January 2004: Mohamed Daouas
- 14 January 2004 – 16 January 2011: Taoufik Baccar
- 17 January 2011 – 27 June 2012: Mustapha Kamel Nabli
- 23 July 2012 – 14 February 2018: Chedly Ayari
- 16 February 2018 – 15 February 2024: Marouane Abassi
- 15 February 2024: Fethi Zouhair Nouri

== See also ==
- Tunisian dinar
- Banking in Tunisia
- Economy of Tunisia
- List of central banks of Africa
- List of central banks
