= Azouz Ennifar =

Azouz Ennifar is a Tunisian diplomat. He currently serves as Acting Special Representative of the Secretary-General for the United Nations Mission in Ethiopia and Eritrea (UNMEE). Ennifar has served as the Tunisian ambassador to Indonesia, Brazil and Italy, and was Chargé d'Affaires in the Tunisian embassy in Paris. He served Ambassador to the United States in 1994, with accreditation to Mexico and Venezuela. He was also a representative of the Tunisian Government at the World Bank and the International Monetary Fund (IMF).

Previously, Ennifar served at the Ministry of National Economy and was once the Managing Director of the Export Promotion Centre, a Government institution shaping Tunisia's foreign trade. He co-founded the non-profit organization Association des Études Internationales.

He is a member of the Cosmos Club of Washington DC.
