= Bahi Ladgham =

Tunisian politician (1913–1998)

- الباهي الأدغم
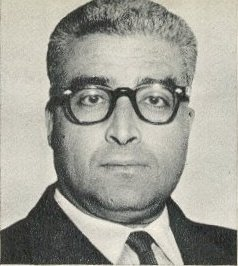
- Ladgham in 1965

Prime Minister of Tunisia
- In office 7 November 1969 – 2 November 1970
- Preceded by: Habib Bourguiba (Indirectly)
- Succeeded by: Hédi Nouira

Personal details
- Born: 10 January 1913 Tunis, French Tunisia
- Died: 13 April 1998 (aged 85) Paris, France
- Spouse: Beya Bahi
- Children: Abderrahman Ladgham

Bahi Ladgham (Arabic: الباهي الأدغم; 10 January 1913 – 13 April 1998) was a Tunisian politician who served as the Secretary of Presidency from 1957 to 1969 (de facto prime minister) and the prime minister of Tunisia from 7 November 1969 to 2 November 1970.

== Biography ==
He is the son of Ahmed Ladgham, himself the son of a Libyan immigrant from Misrata to settle in Tunisia in the mid-nineteenth century because of a local revolt against the Ottoman presence, and a Tunisian woman from the Kachoukh family of the Sahel, Zohra Ben Aouda, daughter of Algerian immigrants from Médéa who fled the French repression of supporters of Emir Abdelkader; she died when he was only eight and a half.

Coming from a modest family living in the Tunisian district of Bab El Akouas, Bahi Ladgham lived in a cultural atmosphere where Tunisians of different origins mix. He studied at the kouttab of his neighborhood before entering Sadiki College in 1921 at the age of eight, on the advice of a friend of his father, Hassen Chadli. Brilliant throughout his studies, he received several awards and congratulations from his teachers, including Mohamed Tahar Ben Achour and Mohamed Salah Mzali.

After the First World War, the backroom of his father is a place for debate and discussion around political and cultural themes: the fall of the Ottoman Empire, the de-Islamization of Turkey by Mustafa Kemal Atatürk, the struggle of Libyan nationalists against Italy but especially the situation of Tunisia with the foundation of Destour by Abdelaziz Thâalbi in 1920.

Also an adept reader, this context leads him to want to revolt against the French occupier.
