= Mohammed Mzali =

Tunisian politician (1925–2010)

Mohamed Mzali
- محمد مزالي
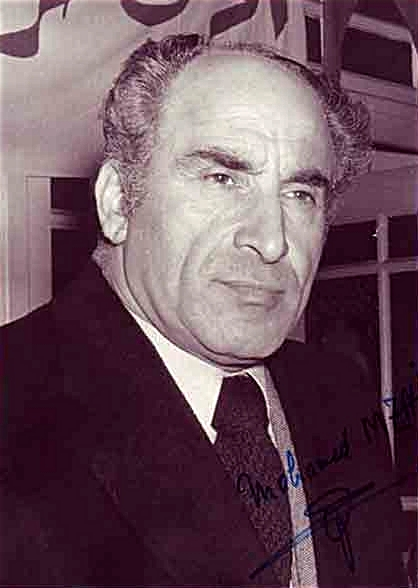

Prime Minister of Tunisia
- In office 23 April 1980 – 8 July 1986
- President: Habib Bourguiba
- Preceded by: Hédi Amara Nouira
- Succeeded by: Rachid Sfar

President of Tunisian Football Federation
- In office 1962–1964
- Preceded by: Chedly Zouiten
- Succeeded by: Fouad Mebazaa

Personal details
- Born: 23 December 1925 Monastir, Tunisia
- Died: 23 June 2010 (aged 84) Paris, France
- Party: Socialist Destourian Party
- Spouse: Fethia Mzali (1950–2010)

Mohammed Mzali (Arabic: محمد مزالي, 23 December 1925 – 23 June 2010) was a Tunisian politician who served as prime minister between 1980 and 1986.

== Early life ==
Mzali was born in Monastir, Tunisia on 23 December 1925. His family has ancestry from the Ait Mzal tribe, a Berber Shilha tribe from the Sous region of Morocco. Their Ait Mzal ancestor settled in Tunisia after coming back from the Hajj in the late 17th century. He is also related to the politician Mohamed Salah Mzali.

Mzali studied at Sadiki College in Tunis and at the Faculty of Humanities at Sorbonne University in Paris. He was vice president of the Federation of Destourian Students in France from 1949 to 1950 and participated in literary social circles. He co-founded the literary magazine Al-Fikr in 1955 with Béchir Ben Slama.

== Political career ==
=== Early career ===
Mzali was a member of the Socialist Destourian Party. He held a series of government posts starting in the late 1950s that would eventually culminate in his becoming prime minister in the early 1980s.

He was first elected to Parliament in 1959 and would be re-elected several times thereafter. Other national positions he held starting in his early career included: General Director for Youth and Sport, founding Director of the Tunisia Radio and Television Company, Minister of Defence, Minister of Youth and Sport, Minister of National Education, Minister of Public Health, and Minister of Interior.

Mzali served as Tunisia's minister of education for three separate stints during the 1970s. One of his legacies while in this position was his support for Arabization in Tunisia at the time. He was interested in Tunisia pursuing a closer international relationship with Gulf countries such as Saudi Arabia.

=== Terms as prime minister ===
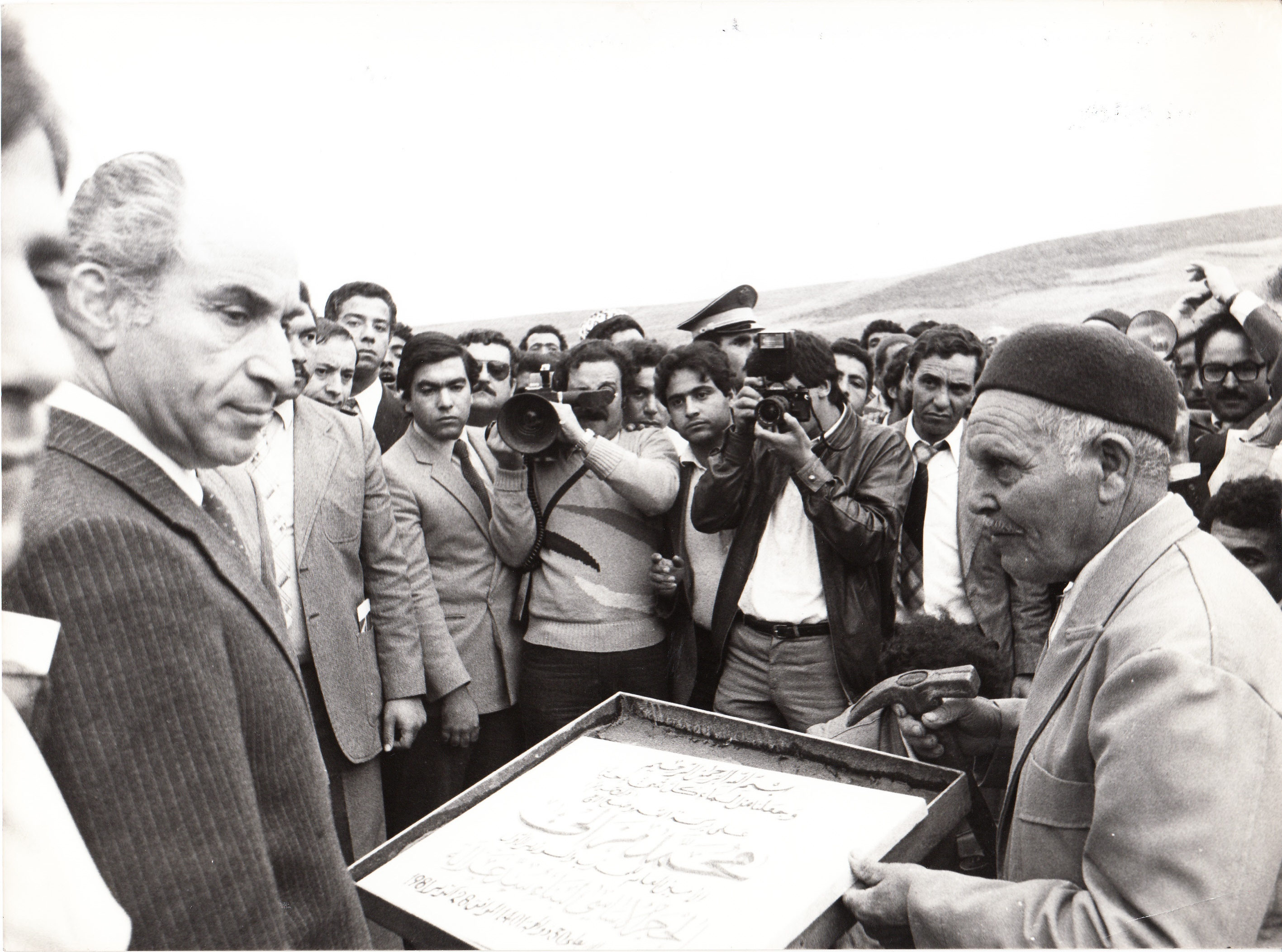
Mohammed Mzali during the 1981 general elections.

Mzali was appointed Prime Minister of Tunisia by President Habib Bourguiba on 23 April 1980. In December 1983, under pressure from the International Monetary Fund, the government removed subsidies on flour and bread. This triggered the Tunisian bread riots, which were violently suppressed by the security forces with many deaths. President Bourguiba announced on 6 January 1984 that the increase in the price of bread and flour had been cancelled. He gave the impression that Mzali had not been authorized to raise prices.

The clumsy handling of the price rise damaged the position of Mzali, who had been seen as the probable successor to Bourguiba. Mzali temporarily assumed the post of Minister of the Interior. In an attempt to recover his popularity, Mzali toured the provinces after the riots, promising projects to create new jobs. He said "the first lesson to be drawn from the events of January was that it is necessary to reorganise the forces of order so that they can respond adequately to all situations."

=== Later career ===
Mzali was dismissed in 1986 and fled to France. He was replaced by Rachid Sfar. Mzali wrote many books, one of them untitled "Un Premier ministre de Bourguiba témoigne". He served as a member of the International Olympic Committee from 1965 until his death.

== Personal life ==
Mohammed Mzali met Fethia Mokhtar while they were both studying in Paris, and they married in 1950. They had six children, and Mokhtar served as Tunisia's Minister for Women from 1983 until 1986.

Mzali died on 23 June 2010 in Paris, France.

== Sources ==
- "Former Tunisian Premier Mohamed Mzali, International Olympic Committee member, dies at 85". Fox News. Associated Press. 24 June 2010. Archived from the original on December 15, 2013.
- Entelis, John Pierre (1997). Islam, Democracy, and the State in North Africa. Indiana University Press. p. 98. ISBN 0-253-21131-X.
- Gana, Nouri (2013). The Making of the Tunisian Revolution: Contexts, Architects, Prospects. Oxford University Press. ISBN 978-0-7486-9103-6.
- Guay, Jean-Herman (2015). "29 décembre 1983: Déclenchement des émeutes du pain en Tunisie". Perspective Monde.
- Lief, Louise (10 January 1984). "Tunisia's riots pose troubling questions". Christian Science Monitor.
- Mzali, Mohamed (2004). Un Premier ministre de Bourguiba témoigne. Paris: Jean Picollec.
- Walton, John K.; Seddon, David (2008-09-15). Free Markets and Food Riots: The Politics of Global Adjustment. John Wiley & Sons. ISBN 978-0-470-71271-9.
