= Hédi Amara Nouira =

Tunisian politician (1911–1993)

Hédi Nouira
- الهادي نويرة
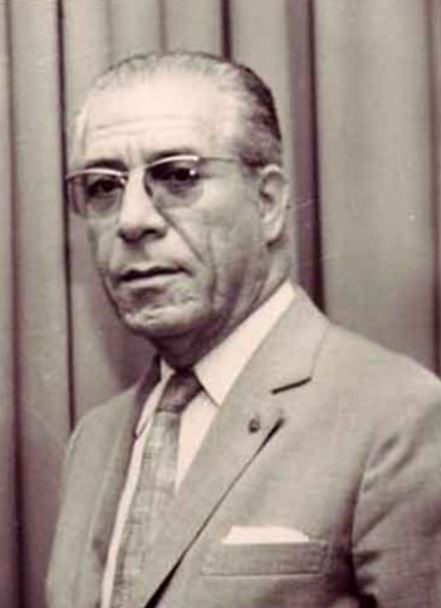

Prime Minister of Tunisia
- In office 2 November 1970 – 23 April 1980
- President: Habib Bourguiba
- Preceded by: Bahi Ladgham
- Succeeded by: Mohamed Mzali

Personal details
- Born: 5 April 1911 Monastir, Tunisia
- Died: 25 January 1993 (aged 81) La Marsa, Tunisia
- Spouse: Assia Ben Hmida

Hédi Amara Nouira (5 April 1911 – 25 January 1993) was a Tunisian politician. He served as the second prime minister of Tunisia between 1970 and 1980.

== Biography ==
Hédi Nouira was born in Monastir and trained as a lawyer. He served as one of the founders of the Neo-Destour party and was a colleague of Habib Bourguiba. He was imprisoned for anti-colonial activities by the French from 1938 to 1943, but later represented the Neo-Destour during negotiations with France towards Tunisian independence in 1950.

Following independence in 1956, Nouira was appointed as finance minister and was later appointed the governor of the Central Bank of Tunisia in 1958. Following the failure of a short-lived Socialist experiment in the 1960s, Nouira liberalised the economy during the 1970s. In 1970, the then governor of the Central Bank, Nouira was appointed prime minister. The most decisive factor in Nouira's appointment seemed to be his commitment to private initiative as well as his financier's background.

Having been named as President Bourguiba's successor in 1974, Nouira's tenure as prime minister saw him increasingly take the roles of the former, who was suffering from ill health. At the same time, he was criticised by workers and dissidents for his harsh stances on labor and opposition to multiparty politics.

He retired from politics in 1980 after suffering a stroke. Nouira died on 25 January 1993, after suffering from an undisclosed illness.

== Family ==
His younger brother, Habib Nouira, served as Tunisian Ambassador to Iraq, Kuwait, Syria and Egypt.

Political offices
Preceded by Bahi Ladgham	Prime Minister of Tunisia; 1970–1980	Succeeded by Mohammed Mzali
