= Arab Parliament =

International parliament of the Arab League

- البرلمان العربي

Parliamentary Union overview
- Formed: December 27, 2002
- Headquarters: Tahrir Square, Cairo
- Motto: For the promotion of democracy and stable development
- Parliamentary Union executive: Mohamed Ahmed Al Yamahi, UAE, President
- Website: www.ar-pr.org

Map
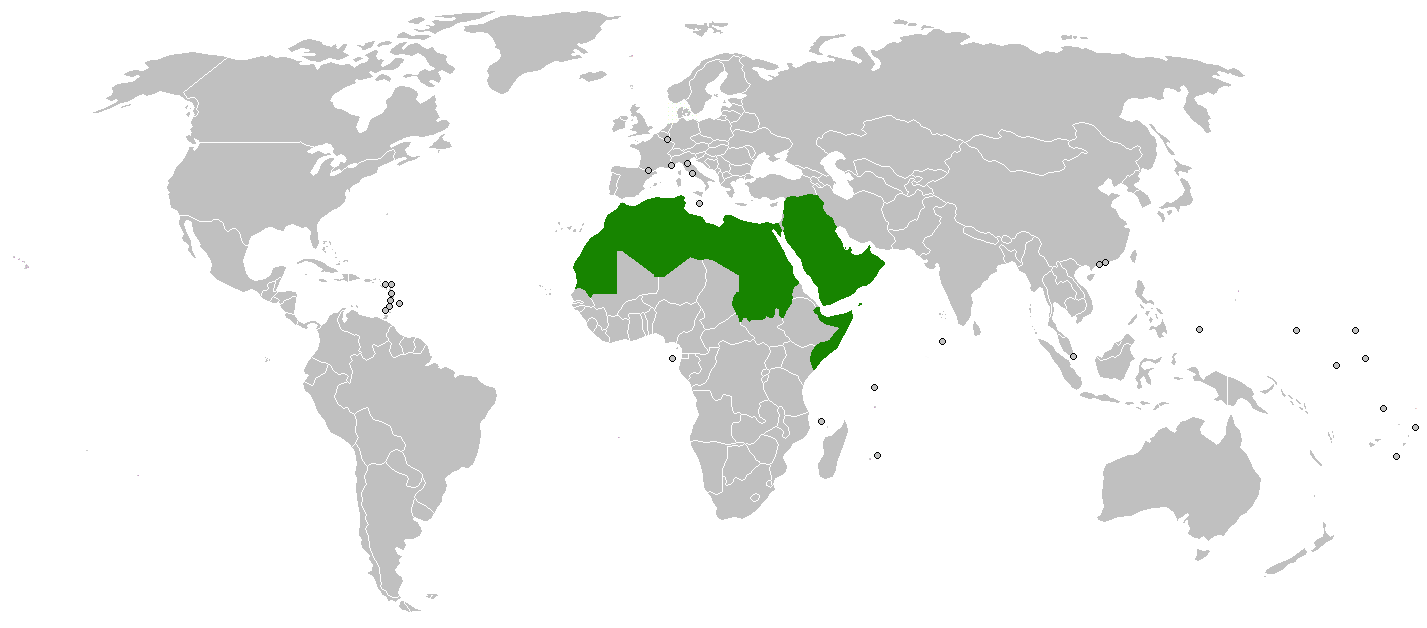
- Arab League members

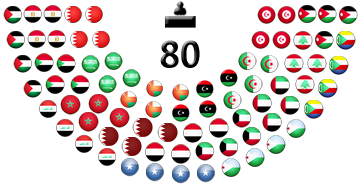
A chart indicates the number of seats for each member state in the Arab Parliament, 2020.

The Arab Parliament (Arabic: البرلمان العربي) is the legislative body of the Arab League. At the 19th Arab League Summit in Amman, the Arab states agreed to create an Arab Parliament, and came up with a resolution to give Amr Moussa the Secretary-General of the Arab League the power to start and create the Parliament.

In 2004, in the ordinary Arab League Summit in Algiers was the official date where all Arab League Members agreed to send their representative to the temporary Parliament sessions that took place in the headquarters of the Arab League in Cairo, Egypt, with each member state sending four members, until the Parliament is reassigned permanently to its under-construction office in Damascus.

The headquarters was in Damascus until on May 22, 2012, the sessions were suspended and transferred to Cairo. The Arab League is now preparing to move the headquarters of the parliament to Baghdad.

Mohamed Ahmed Al Yamahi (of UAE) is the current president of the Parliament.

== List of Members of the Parliament ==
- Algeria : Yousef Mohamed Rahmanieh
- Algeria : Mohammad Khawan
- Algeria : Arab Counter
- Algeria : Issa Bourguiba
- Bahrain : Hisham Ahmed Al-Ashiri
- Bahrain : Ibtisam Mohammed Saleh Al-Dalal
- Bahrain : Adel Abdulrahman Al-Maawda
- Bahrain : Mamdouh Abbas Al-Saleh
- Comoros : Zubair Mohammed Ahmed
- Comoros : Zaafa Ali Othman
- Comoros : Sultan Ali
- Comoros : Ladaa Hamdi
- Djibouti : Mahmoud Hassan Farah
- Djibouti : Ali Zaid Ahmed Al Shazly
- Djibouti : Abdo Kamil Mohamed
- Djibouti : Ibrahim Ahmed Abdo
- Egypt : Ahmed Fouad Suleiman Abaza
- Egypt : Hisham Salah Ahmed Al-Hosary
- Egypt : Mohamed Orabi
- Egypt : Shadia Khudair Al-Jamal
- Iraq : Habib Hashem Abd Ali
- Iraq : Hassan Khalaf Alu Al-Jubouri
- Iraq : Falah Saeed Jarmat Al-Dulaimi
- Iraq : Hanan Saeed Al-Fatlawi
- Jordan : Mujhem Hamad Hussein Al-Suquor
- Jordan : Atallah Ali Qazi Al-Hunaiti
- Jordan : Ali Salem Al-Khalayla
- Jordan : Ihsan Zuhdi Barakat
- Kuwait : Abd-El-Wahed Mahmoud El-Awadi
- Kuwait : Unknown
- Kuwait : Unknown
- Kuwait : Unknown
- Kuwait : Unknown
- Lebanon : Unknown
- Lebanon : Unknown
- Lebanon : Unknown
- Lebanon : Unknown
- Libya : Abdulsalam Abdullah Mohammed Nasiyah
- Libya : Hassan al Taher Ali Misbah al Barghouti
- Libya : Ahlam Mohammed Al-Lafi Khalifa
- Libya : Abu Salah Abdulsalam Abu Salah Shalabi
- Mauritania : Jinap Samp Kork
- Mauritania : Mohamed Al Amin Sayed Mouloud
- Mauritania : Al-Yakhir Sayed Al-Mukhtar
- Mauritania : Mohamed Abd El Rahman Al Sabbar
- Morocco : Mohamed Al Bakouri
- Morocco : Mohamed Ayyash
- Morocco : Khadija Hajoubi
- Morocco : Mohamed Lahmouche
- Oman : Talib Bin Hilal Bin Sultan Al Hosani
- Oman : Surya bint Khalfan bin Amer Al-Hadiya
- Oman : Saeed Bin Hamad Bin Hilal Al-Saadi
- Oman : Humaid Bin Ali Bin Humaid Bin Rashid Al-Nasseri
- Palestine : Kayed Al Ghoul
- Palestine : Saleh Mohamed Awad Nasser
- Palestine : Nasr Abdullah Abu Salim
- Palestine : Mai Salem Hanna Al-Kayla
- Qatar : Amina bint Yousef Mahmoud
- Qatar : Ali Ahmed Saad Al Kaabi
- Qatar : Nasser Bin Mohammed Nasser Al Nuaimi
- Qatar : Mubarak bin Mohammed Matar Al-Kuwari
- Saudi Arabia : Hanan bint Abdullah bin Muhammad Al-Samari
- Saudi Arabia : Tariq bin Saeed bin Halil Al-Shammari
- Saudi Arabia : Saad bin Salib bin Mutlaq Al-Otaibi
- Saudi Arabia : Abdullah bin Abdulaziz bin Abdullah bin Aifan
- Somalia : Zamzam Abdullah Ahmed
- Somalia : Mohamed Askar Mosque
- Somalia : Abd El Aziz Mohamed Mahmoud
- Somalia : Abd El Hakim Moallem Ahmed
- Sudan : Unknown
- Sudan : Unknown
- Sudan : Unknown
- Sudan : Unknown
- Syria : Unknown
- Syria : Unknown
- Syria : Unknown
- Syria : Unknown
- Tunisia : Maher Al Katari
- Tunisia : Mohamed Al Yahyawi
- Tunisia : Ayman Nuqra
- Tunisia : Ayman Al-Boghdiri
- United Arab Emirates : Naima Abdullah Saeed Al Sharhan
- United Arab Emirates : Mohammed Ahmed Al Yamahi
- United Arab Emirates : Majid Mohammed Al Mazrouei
- United Arab Emirates : Muhammad Hassan Suleiman Al Dhahouri
- Yemen : Mahdi Ali Abd El Salam
- Yemen : Alawi Al-Basha Bin Zabaa
- Yemen : Abd El Wahab Mahmoud Ali Moawada
- Yemen : Insaf Ali Mohammed

== Observers ==
- Turkey (2010).
