= Nabil Elaraby =

Egyptian politician and diplomat (1935–2024)

- نبيل العربي
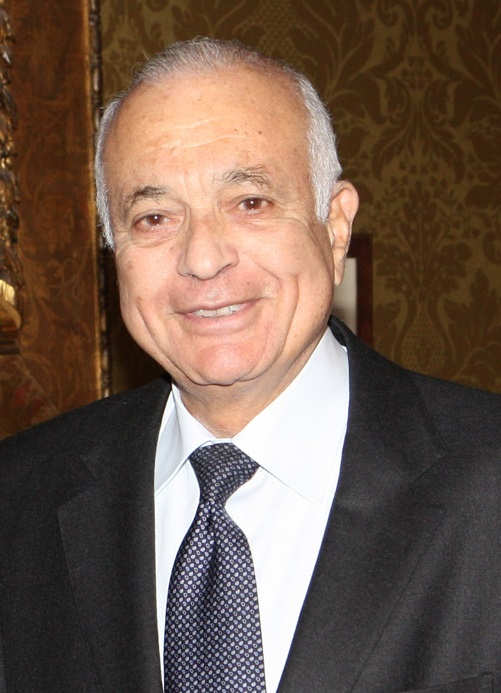
- Elaraby in 2013

7th Secretary-General of the Arab League
- In office 1 July 2011 – 3 July 2016
- Deputy: Samir Nasibi
- Preceded by: Amr Moussa
- Succeeded by: Ahmed Aboul Gheit

Minister of Foreign Affairs
- In office 6 March 2011 – 1 June 2011
- Prime Minister: Essam Sharaf
- Preceded by: Ahmed Aboul Gheit
- Succeeded by: Mohamed Orabi

Ambassador to the United Nations
- In office 20 May 1991 – 20 May 1995
- President: Hosni Mubarak
- Preceded by: Amr Moussa
- Succeeded by: Ahmed Asmat Abdel-Meguid

Personal details
- Born: 15 March 1935 Cairo, Egypt
- Died: 26 August 2024 (aged 89)
- Education: Cairo University; New York University

Nabil Elaraby (Arabic: نبيل العربي; 15 March 1935 – 26 August 2024) was an Egyptian politician and diplomat who was the 7th Secretary General of the Arab League from 1 July 2011 to 3 July 2016. Elaraby also had roles in the United Nations, holding positions at the United Nations Institute for Training and Research and serving as a Permanent Representative to the United Nations.

Elaraby served as one of the liaisons between the protesters and the government during the 2011 Egyptian protests, and played a key role in pressing for the removal of President Hosni Mubarak. Afterwards, he served as the Foreign Affairs Minister of Egypt in Essam Sharaf's post-revolution government from March to June 2011.

Elaraby also served on the United Nations Compensation Commission in Geneva from 1999 to 2001, and was a member of the International Court of Justice from 2001 to February 2006. He was honored with the Grand Cordon of the Order of the Arab Republic of Egypt and as the Grand Officier of the Order of the Republic of Tunisia.

== Personal life ==
Elaraby was born on 15 March 1935. He held a J.S.D. (1971) and an LL.M. (1969) from the New York University School of Law and a law degree from Cairo University's Faculty of Law (1955).

Elaraby died on 26 August 2024, at the age of 89.

== Career ==
Elaraby was a Senior Partner at Zaki Hashem & Partners in Cairo, specialising in negotiations and Arbitration.

=== Egyptian government ===
Elaraby was legal adviser and director in the Legal and Treaties Department of the Ministry of Foreign Affairs from 1976 to 1978 and then Ambassador to India from 1981 to 1983. He then returned to his previous post at the Foreign Ministry from 1983 to 1987.

He was legal adviser to the Egyptian delegation to the Camp David Middle East peace conference in 1978, head of the Egyptian delegation to the Taba negotiations from 1985 to 1989, and Agent of the Egyptian Government to the Egyptian-Israeli arbitration tribunal (Taba dispute) from 1986 to 1988.

He was appointed by the Egyptian Minister of Justice to the list of arbitrators in civil and commercial affairs in Egypt in 1995.

He was Egypt's top negotiator at the Taba Summit in 2001.

=== United Nations ===
In 1968, Elaraby was an Adlai Stevenson Fellow in International Law at the United Nations Institute for Training and Research (UNITAR). He was appointed a Special Fellow in International Law at UNITAR in 1973, and was legal adviser to the Egyptian delegation to the United Nations Geneva Middle East peace conference from 1973 to 1975.

Elaraby was Egypt's Deputy Permanent Representative to the United Nations in New York from 1978 to 1981, the Permanent Representative to the UN Office at Geneva from 1987 to 1991, the Permanent Representative to the UN in New York from 1991 to 1999, a member of the International Law Commission of the United Nations from 1994 to 2004, President of the Security Council in 1996, and vice-president of the General Assembly in 1993, 1994 and 1997. He was a commissioner at the United Nations Compensation Commission in Geneva from 1999 to 2001, and a member of the International Court of Justice from 2001 to February 2006.

Elaraby served as chairman for the First (Disarmament and international security questions) Committee of the General Assembly, the Informal Working Group on an Agenda for Peace, the Working Group on Legal Instruments for the UN Conference on Environment and Development in Rio de Janeiro, and the UN Special Committee on Enhancing the Principle of the Prohibition of the Use of Force in International Relations.

=== Other international work ===
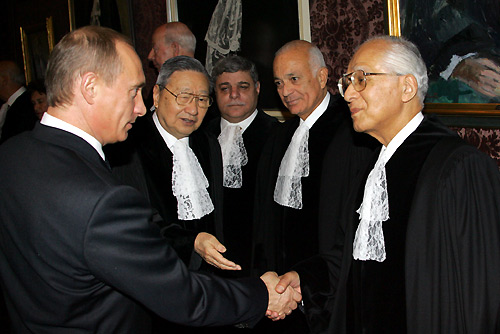
Elaraby as a member of UN International Court of Justice, meeting with Russian President Vladimir Putin, 2 November 2005

Elaraby was an Arbitrator at the International Chamber of Commerce International Court of Arbitration in Paris in a dispute concerning the Suez Canal from 1989 to 1992. He was a judge in the Judicial Tribunal of the Organization of Arab Petroleum Exporting Countries in 1990.

Elaraby was a member of the governing board of the Stockholm International Peace Research Institute from 2000 to 2010. Beginning in December 2008 he served as the Director of the Regional Cairo Centre for International Commercial Arbitration and as a counsel of the Sudanese government in the "Abyei Boundary" Arbitration between the Government of Sudan and the Sudanese People's Revolutionary Movement.

=== 2011 Egyptian revolution and transitional government ===
Nabil Elaraby was one of the group of about 30 high-profile Egyptians acting as liaison between the protesters and the government, and pressing for the removal of President Hosni Mubarak.

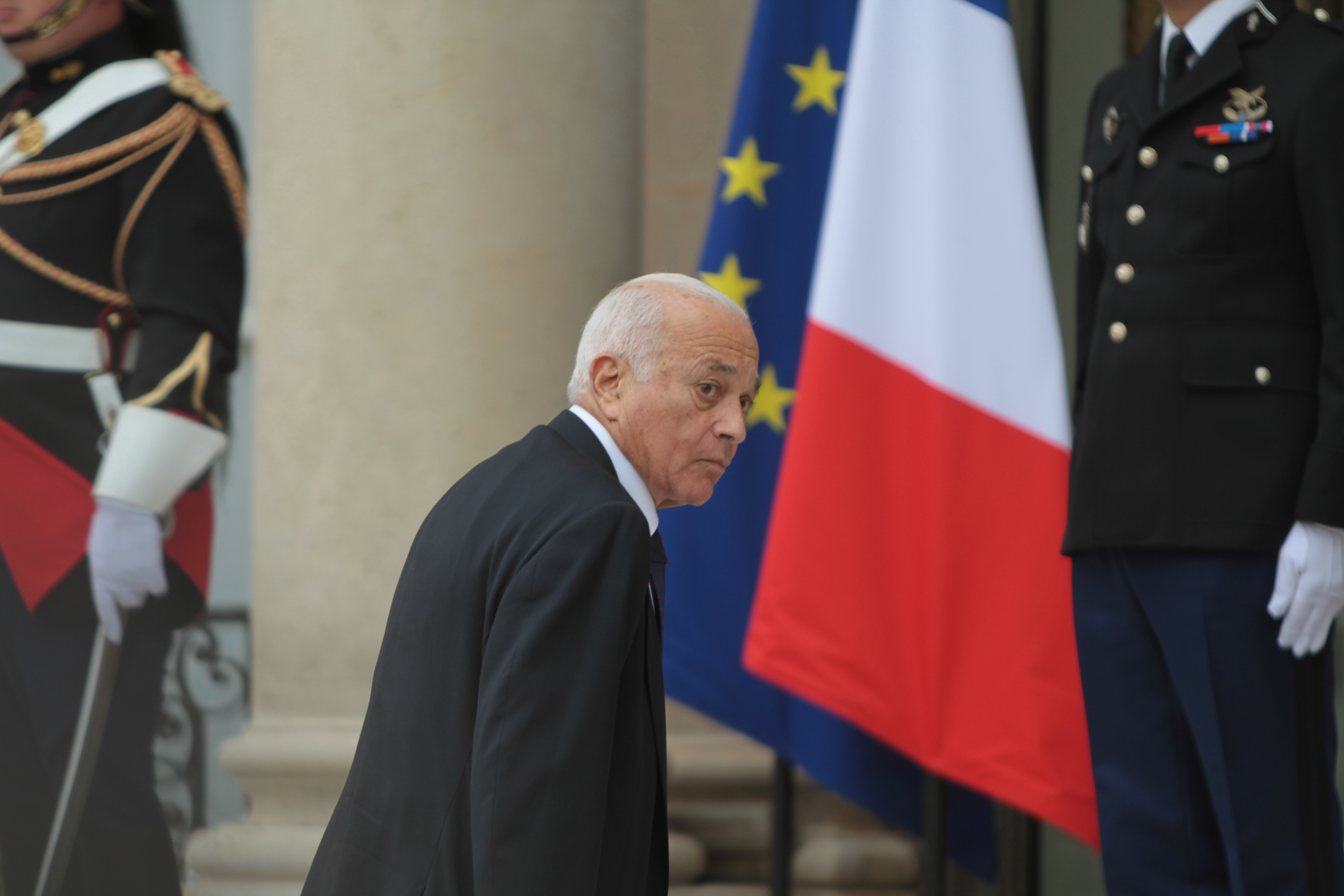
Elaraby in International Conference in Support of the New Libya, Paris, 1 September 2011

At a democracy forum on 25 February 2011, he said the Egyptian government suffered from a lack of separation of powers, a lack of transparency and a lack of judicial independence. He said foreign policy should be based on Egypt's interests, including "holding Israel accountable when it does not respect its obligations."

On 6 March 2011, he was appointed Foreign Affairs Minister of Egypt in Essam Sharaf's post-revolution cabinet. Thereafter, he opened the Rafah Border Crossing with Gaza and brokered the reconciliation of Hamas with Fatah.

=== Arab League ===
On 15 May 2011, he was appointed Secretary General of the Arab League, succeeding Amr Moussa. He officially took office on 1 July 2011 and served until 3 July 2016.

== Honours ==
Ribbon bar	Country	Honour
	Egypt	Grand Cordon of the Order of the Arab Republic of Egypt
	Japan	Order of the Rising Sun, Gold and Silver Star
	Tunisia	Grand Officier of the Order of the Republic of Tunisia

== Publications ==
- (in Arabic) Taba, Camp David, Israeli West Bank barrier : From United Nations Security Council to the International Court of Justice (طابا.. كامب ديفيد.. الجدار العازل: صراع الدبلوماسية من مجلس الأمن إلى المحكمة الدولية), ed. Dar al-Chorouq, Cairo, 2017.

Diplomatic posts
Preceded by Amr Moussa	Ambassador to the United Nations; 1991–1995	Succeeded by Ahmed Asmat Abdel-Meguid
Preceded by Amr Moussa	Secretary-General of the Arab League; 2011–2016	Succeeded by Ahmed Aboul Gheit
Political offices
Preceded by Ahmed Aboul Gheit	Minister of Foreign Affairs; 2011	Succeeded by Mohamed Orabi
