= Egypt–Mexico relations =

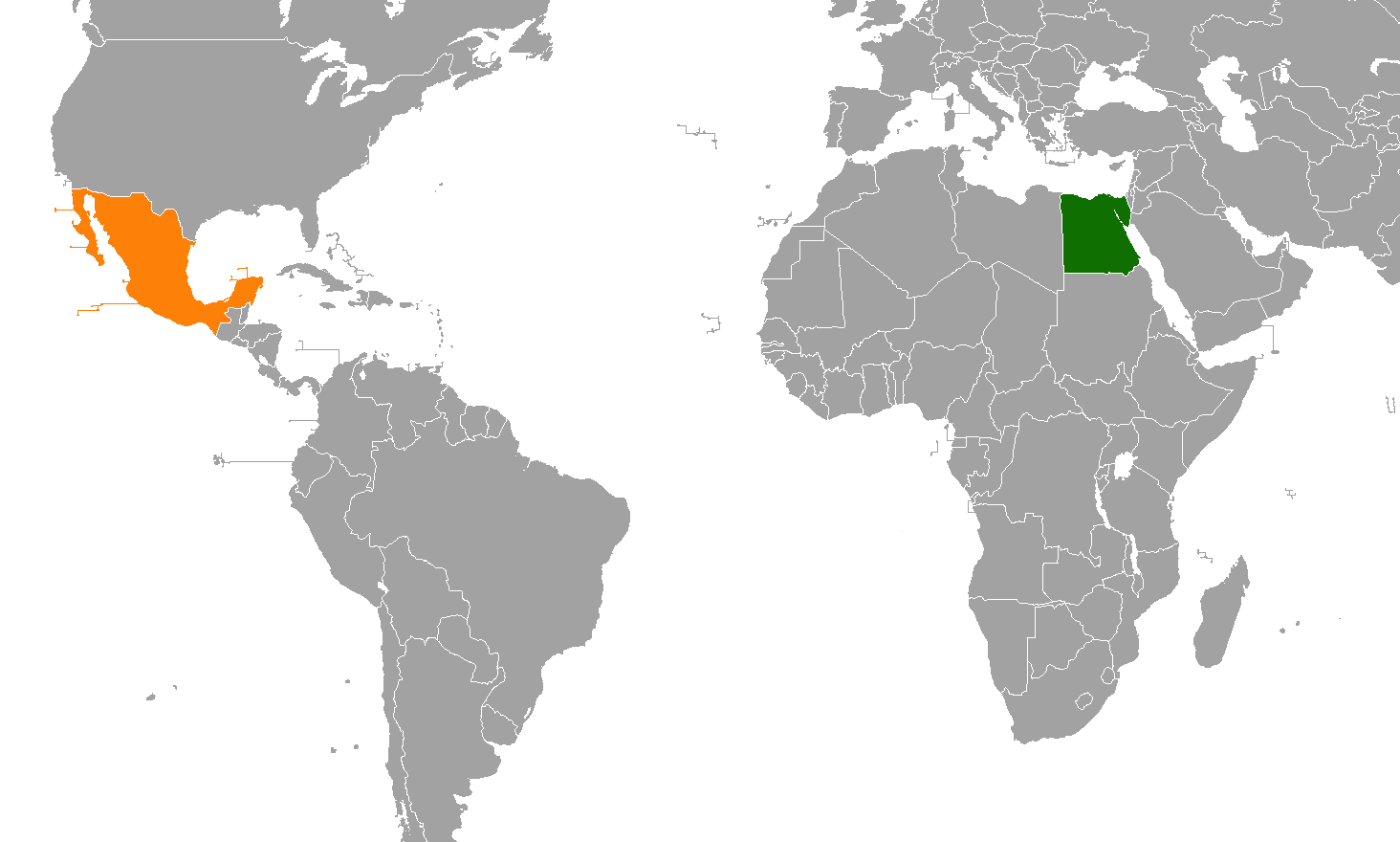

- Egypt: Mexico

The nations of Egypt and Mexico established diplomatic relations in 1958, however, the two states interacted non-officially before then. As early as 1861 Egyptian soldiers joined French Emperor Napoleon III invasion of Mexico. In the early 20th century, Mexico opened a consulate on the Mediterranean port city of Alexandria. Since Egypt's independence in 1922, both nations have maintained a warm relationship based on cultural exchanges, tourism and trade.

Both nations are members of the Group of 15, Group of 24 and the United Nations.

== History ==
During the Second French intervention in Mexico, Mohamed Sa'id Pasha of Egypt agreed to send Emperor Napoleon III an Auxiliary Battalion of 447 Egyptian-Sudanese soldiers (mostly Sudanese enlisted men with Egyptian officers) to Mexico. At the time, it was thought that soldiers from Africa would "adapt" better to the heat in Mexico than the French. In 1867 the surviving 326 soldiers were shipped to France before returning to Egypt.

In 1905, Mexico opened a consulate in the port city of Alexandria to assist Mexican ships which stopped in the city before or after traveling through the Suez Canal. In 1922, Egypt obtained independence from the United Kingdom and diplomatic relations between Egypt and Mexico were established on 31 March 1958. In 1960 both nations opened a resident embassy in each other's capitals, respectively. Since then, relations between both nations have mostly been based on mutual respect and cooperation on international issues at the United Nations. In 1975, Mexican President Luis Echeverría paid an official visit to Egypt and in 1981, President José López Portillo also visited Egypt.

In September 2015 a group of 14 Mexican tourists were mistakenly attacked by Egyptian Security Forces while they were on holiday in Egypt's Western Desert. Egyptian officials said security forces mistook the tourists for terrorists. During the attack, eight Mexican nationals were killed and six were injured. Mexico's government condemned the incident, calling for an exhaustive investigation of the incident. Mexico's Foreign Minister, Claudia Ruiz Massieu, stated that the Mexican government would not sever diplomatic relations with Egypt over the incident.

Both countries regularly provide cultural exhibitions in each other's countries and in 1996, both nations established the Egyptian-Mexican Association for Egyptology. In 2018, both nations celebrated 60 years of diplomatic relations.

In June 2022, Mexican Foreign Undersecretary Carmen Moreno Toscano paid a visit to Egypt. While in Egypt, both nations signed a Memorandum of Understanding between both nations Ministries of Foreign Affairs. Undersecretary Moreno also visited the Arab League to strengthen regular high-level consultations with the regional organization and Mexico. That same year in November, Mexican Foreign Minister Marcelo Ebrard paid a visit to Egypt to attend the 2022 United Nations Climate Change Conference in Sharm El Sheikh.

== High-level visits ==
High-level visits from Egypt to Mexico

- Secretary of State for Foreign Affairs Boutros Boutros-Ghali (1981, 1984, 1987)
- Minister of Culture Faruq Hosni (2008)
- Deputy Foreign Minister Mohamed Orabi (2010)

High-level visits from Mexico to Egypt

- Foreign Minister Emilio Óscar Rabasa (1974)
- President Luis Echeverría (1975)
- President José López Portillo (1981)
- Foreign Minister Bernardo Sepúlveda Amor (1986)
- Foreign Minister Rosario Green (1998)
- Foreign Minister Luis Ernesto Derbez (2006)
- Foreign Undersecretary Lourdes Aranda Bezaury (2009)
- Foreign Minister Patricia Espinosa Cantellano (2010)
- Foreign Minister Claudia Ruiz Massieu (2015)
- Foreign Undersecretary Carmen Moreno Toscano (2022)
- Foreign Minister Marcelo Ebrard (2022)

== Bilateral agreements ==
Both nations have signed several bilateral agreements such as an Agreement on Cultural Exchanges (1960); Trade Agreement (1963); Agreement on Economic Cooperation (1984); Agreement on Cultural, Scientific and Technical Cooperation (1987); Agreement on Educational Cooperation (1987); Agreement on Touristic Cooperation (1991) and a Memorandum of Understanding between both nations Ministries of Foreign Affairs (2022).

== Trade relations ==
In 2023, total trade between Egypt and Mexico totaled US$130 million. Egypt's main exports to Mexico include: car parts, cotton and textiles. Mexico's main exports to Egypt include: gas and oil casing tubes, metal cylinders, sesame seeds and alcohol (tequila). Mexican multinational companies such as Cemex, Gruma, KidZania, Rotoplas and Sukarne (among others) operate in Egypt.

== Resident diplomatic missions ==
- Egypt has an embassy in Mexico City.
- Mexico has an embassy in Cairo.
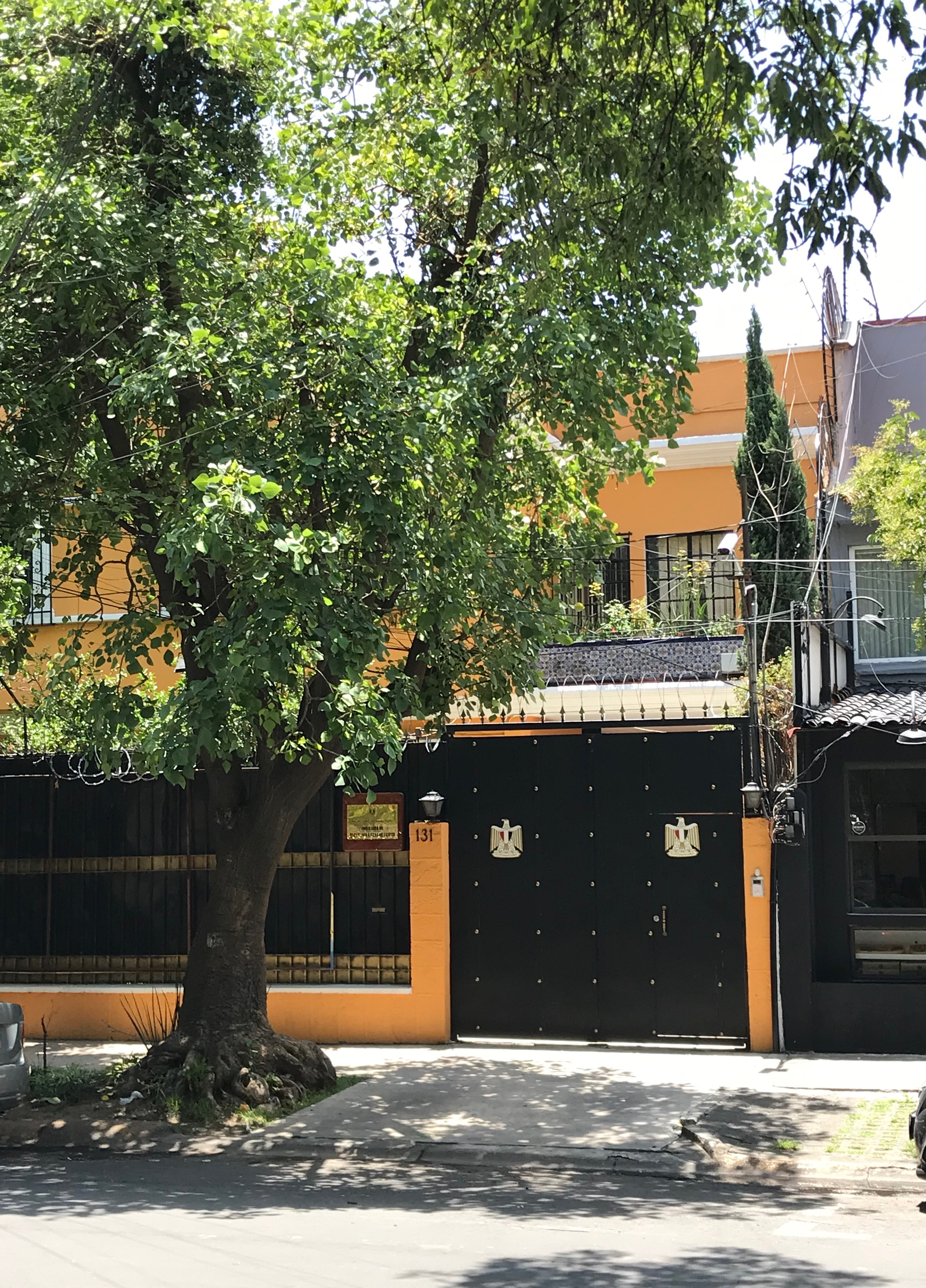
Embassy of Egypt in Mexico City

== See also ==
- Arab Mexicans
