= Abdul Rahman Hassan Azzam =

Egyptian diplomat and politician (1893–1976)

- عبد الرحمن حسن عزام
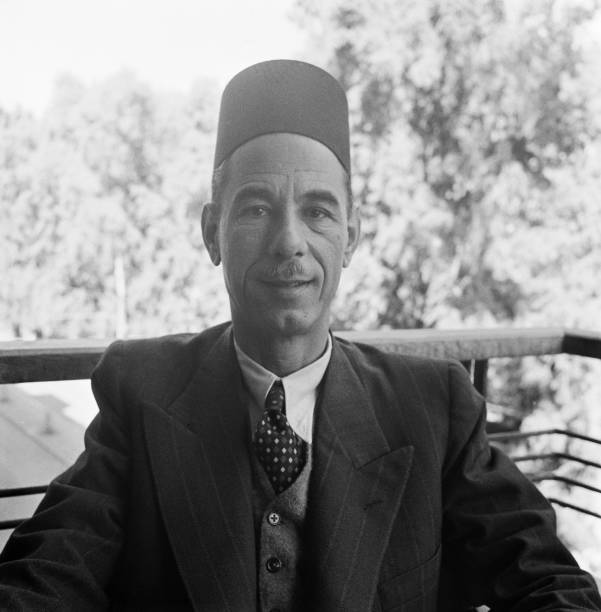
- Azzam in 1946

1st Secretary-General of the Arab League
- In office 22 March 1945 – September 1952
- Preceded by: Position established
- Succeeded by: Abdul Khalek Hassouna

Personal details
- Born: 8 March 1893 Shubak al-Gharbi, Giza Governorate, Khedivate of Egypt
- Died: 2 June 1976 (aged 83) Cairo, Egypt

Abdul Rahman Hassan Azzam (Arabic: عبد الرحمن حسن عزام; 8 March 1893 – 2 June 1976), also known as Azzam Pasha, was an Egyptian diplomat and politician. He was the first Secretary-General of the Arab League, from 22 March 1945 to September 1952.

Azzam also had a long career as an ambassador and parliamentarian. He was an Egyptian nationalist, one of the foremost proponents of pan-Arab idealism, and opposed the partition of Palestine.

== Family and early life ==
Abd al-Rahman Azzam's father, Hassan Bey, was born into an upper-class Arab family which became prominent during the first half of the nineteenth century in Shubak al-Gharbi, a village near Helwan (south of Cairo). His grandfather, Salim Ali Azzam, was one of the first Arabs to become director of the southern Giza Governorate; his father, Hassan Salim Azzam, was also active in many regional governing bodies. Azzam's mother, Nabiha, was also descended from a distinguished family. Her father, Khalaf al-Saudi, was a landowner and shaykh and her mother's family descended from several Arabian Peninsula tribes.

According to biographer Ralph Coury, scholars and others have concluded that Azzam's "Peninsular" origins explain his later assumption of Arab identity. As early as 1923, a British official wrote: "The Azzam family, though settled in Egypt for some generations, come of good old Arab stock, and have always clung tenaciously to Arab traditions and ideals of life", adding, "in estimating Abdul Rahman's character, his early up-bringing and his Arab blood must never be forgotten." However, Coury writes that the Azzams were completely assimilated into village life and did not see themselves as different from other Egyptians. Azzam once said, "We were not brought up with a strong consciousness of Bedouin descent. We were Arabs because we were 'sons' or 'children' of the Arabs in contrast to the Turks, but the term 'Arab' as such was used for the Bedouin and we would not apply it to one another."

=== Childhood and education ===
Abd al-Rahman Azzam, the eighth of twelve children, was born on 8 March 1893, in Shubak al-Gharbi. His family were fellahin dhwati ("notable peasants"), whose position was determined by land, wealth, and political power. The Azzam household was frequently home to gatherings of the village elite, and he developed an interest in politics at an early age. According to his brother, Abd al-Aziz Azzam, Azzam was a "born politician" who would stand at the top of the stairs as a child and give political speeches to his siblings.

In 1903, the Azzam family moved to Helwan to facilitate Hassan Bey's attendance at government meetings in the city. The effendis who were frequent visitors to Shubak were now neighbors, and the friendships which quickly developed between the effendi children and Azzam led him to insist on attending a secular primary school (ibtidaiyyah) instead of the Azhar. Azzam remained in Helwan through secondary school and, upon graduation, decided to study medicine. About his decision, he said: "I wanted to be active in politics and I thought that I could practice medicine wherever that struggle might lead." In 1912 Azzam left Egypt for London, where he enrolled in St. Thomas’ Hospital Medical School.

In London Azzam joined the Sphinx Society, a political group where he quickly became prominent. However, after his first year of study he grew concerned with developments in the Balkans and felt compelled to contribute to the Ottoman cause. Unsure of the form that contribution would take, Azzam decided to leave London for the Balkans and spent considerable time in Istanbul, Albania, and Anatolia. During his travels, Azzam connected with like-minded political activists and spoke with many non-Egyptian Arabs.

Back in Egypt, he was banned by occupation authorities from returning to England because of his nationalist activities there and in Egypt; arrangements were made for him to attend the Cairo Medical School of Qasr al-Ayni. While studying in Cairo, Azzam became disaffected with the British occupation; this revived his desire to leave the country and join the Ottomans.

== Libyan resistance: 1915–1923 ==
Azzam actively participated in the Libyan resistance against the Italians from 1915 to 1923. In December 1915, he left Egypt to join Nuri Bey and a group of Ottoman officers who were leading a Senussi army against the British. After fighting ceased and Sayyid Idris and the British signed a peace treaty in 1917, Nuri Bey and Azzam moved to Tripolitania in the hope of developing a centralized authority. On 18 November 1918, leaders met at al-Qasabat and proclaimed the Tripolitanian Republic. After negotiations between the Italians and Tripolitanian chiefs, on 1 June 1919 the Fundamental Law of Tripolitania (granting the natives full Italian nationality) was enacted. Despite the agreement, the Italians refused to implement the law. This led to the formation of the National Reform Party, led by Azzam, to pressure the Italians to uphold the law. The Italians refused to concede, and in January 1923 Azzam accompanied Sayyid Idris into exile in Egypt. By 1924, opposition in Tripolitania had waned.

Azzam credited his tenure in the early Libyan resistance movement with his turn to Arabism. In 1970, he said: "When I was a boy, I was an Egyptian Muslim. Being an Egyptian and Muslim didn't change. But from 1919 on, with Syria and Iraq gone, I started talking of Arabism. Living with the bedouin, etc. worked gradually to make me a supporter for something Arabic. The Tripolitanian Republic decisively marked the shift to Arabism."

== Wafd membership: 1923–1932 ==
Azzam's return to Egypt coincided with a number of debates by the Wafd, the palace and the British about the new constitution. Hoping to reestablish himself in the country, he ran for office in 1924 and was elected to parliament as a member of the Wafd. As a parliamentarian, Azzam became well-known through his articles for the party's newspaper.

Due to his time in Libya, the Wafd often chose him to represent the party at formal meetings and international conferences. Azzam's most important trip as an Egyptian Wafd representative was to the 1931 General Islamic Conference in Jerusalem. Because members of the Azhar and Sidqi ministry were strongly opposed to two of the conference's major agenda items–the creation of a new Islamic university in Jerusalem and restoration of the caliphate–the Egyptian government refused to send an official delegate to the meeting. However, Azzam and several other members of the Egyptian opposition attended the conference. Taking an active part in the proceedings, he was elected to the congress' executive committee and discussed Arab nationalism at length. This conference is one of the first instances in which Arab nationalists included Egypt in the pan-Arab nation.

In November 1932, Azzam and several other party members left the Wafd. Although he was viewed by some as a traitor, he maintained that changes in his opinions were the reason. Azzam's reputation for knowledge of Arab affairs was valued, and he soon became a member of the palace entourage surrounding King Faruq.

== 1932–1945 ==
After breaking with the Wafd, Azzam joined the elite ranks of liberals—all Wafd and Liberal Constitutionalist dissidents—who had supported liberal proposals for a coalition government in 1932. In 1936, 'Ali Mahir appointed him Egyptian ambassador to Iraq and Iran, and in 1937 the Nahhas ministry increased his diplomatic ministry to include Saudi Arabia. In 1944 he was appointed minister for Arab affairs and Azmir al Hajj.

== Secretary-General of the Arab League 1945–1952 ==
In 1945, Azzam was selected as the first Secretary-General of the Arab League during World War II. One of his first acts as Secretary-General was to condemn the 2–3 November 1945 anti-Jewish rioting in Egypt in which Jewish- and other non-Muslim-owned shops were destroyed and the Ashkenazi synagogue in Cairo's Muski quarter was set ablaze.

In a 2 March 1946 address to the Anglo-American Committee of Inquiry into the problems of European Jewry and Palestine, Azzam explained the Arab League’s attitude towards Palestine and rejected the Zionist claim to the region:

Our brother has gone to Europe and to the West and come back something else. He has come back with a totally different conception of things, West and not Eastern. That doesn't mean that we are necessarily quarreling with anyone who comes from the West. But the Jew, our old cousin, coming back with imperialistic ideas, with materialistic ideas, with reactionary or revolutionary ideas and trying to implement them first by British pressure and then by American pressure, and then by terrorism on his own part – he is not the old cousin and we do not extend to him a very good welcome. The Zionist, the new Jew, wants to dominate and he pretends that he has got a particular civilizing mission with which he returns to a backward, degenerate race in order to put the elements of progress into an area which wants no progress. Well, that has been the pretension of every power that wanted to colonize and aimed at domination. The excuse has always been that the people are backward and that he has got a human mission to put them forward. The Arabs simply stand and say NO. We are not reactionary and we are not backward. Even if we are ignorant, the difference between ignorance and knowledge is ten years in school. We are a living, vitally strong nation, we are in our renaissance; we are producing as many children as any nation in the world. We still have our brains. We have a heritage of civilization and of spiritual life. We are not going to allow ourselves to be controlled either by great nations or small nations or dispersed nations.

Azzam attended an Arab League council meeting in Bloudan, Syria, between 12 and 18 June 1946, which discussed the dangers of a possible confrontation with the Zionist movement and the Arab support to the Palestinians. He later returned to Egypt where he met J. Rives Childs, and informed him of the Arab decision to discuss Palestine with the United Kingdom which controlled the ground.

However, Azzam visited Paris twice in 1946 and 1951, where he discussed Tunisia, Algeria and Morocco issues which brought him criticism from the French journals.

On 11 May 1948, Azzam warned the Egyptian government that because of public pressure and strategic issues, it would be difficult for Arab leaders to avoid intervention in the Palestine War and Egypt might find itself isolated if it did not act in concert with its neighbours. Azzam believed that King Abdullah of Jordan had decided to move his forces into Palestine on 15 May, regardless of what the other Arabs did, and would occupy the Arab part of Palestine (blaming other Arab states for failure). Details of the dialogue between Abdullah I and Azzam are recounted in the memoirs of the Iraqi military and political figure Taha al-Hashimi (1888-1961). Addressing Abdullah, Azzam said: "You are right, we will have time to ensure the creation of Greater Syria, but the Palestinian issue is of primary importance. We must abandon everything until we resolve it." When Abdullah asked what the fate of Palestine would then be, that is, who would govern it, Azzam replied: "The reign of Salah ad-Din came to an end after he saved Palestine from the Crusaders, but his name was glorified for a thousand years. The reign of a monarch is not eternal, but a glorious name lives on through the ages." King Farouk resolved to contain Abdullah and prevent him from gaining further influence and power in the Arab arena. Six days after the Arab intervention in the conflict began, Azzam told reporters: "We are fighting for an Arab Palestine. Whatever the outcome the Arabs will stick to their offer of equal citizenship for Jews in Arab Palestine and let them be as Jewish as they like. In areas where they predominate, they will have complete autonomy."

=== Controversy over "war of extermination" quote ===
One day after the Israeli Declaration of Independence (14 May 1948), troops and volunteers from Syria, Iraq, Egypt and Transjordan entered Palestine and joined several thousand Palestinians. This marked the beginning of the 1948 Arab–Israeli War. Azzam reportedly said on that day (or on the eve of the war), "This will be a war of extermination and a momentous massacre which will be spoken of like the Mongolian massacres and the Crusades." The quotation was usually cited to a press conference in Cairo, broadcast (in some versions) by the BBC. In 1961, an Egyptian writer called the quotation "completely out of context": "Azzam actually said that he feared that if the people of Palestine were to be forcibly and against all right dispossessed, a tragedy comparable to the Mongol invasions and the Crusades might not be avoidable ... The reference to the Crusaders and the Mongols aptly describes the view of the foreign Zionist invaders shared by most Arabs."

In 2010, doubt of the quotation's source was voiced by Joffe and Romirowsky and Benny Morris. It was the subject of an article by David Barnett and Efraim Karsh. Azzam's quote was found to have originated in an 11 October 1947 interview for the Egyptian newspaper Akhbar el-Yom: "Personally I hope the Jews do not force us into this war because it will be a war of elimination and it will be a dangerous massacre which history will record similarly to the Mongol massacre or the wars of the Crusades. I think the number of volunteers from outside Palestine will exceed the Palestinian population."

At the time of Azzam's interview, the United Nations Special Committee on Palestine had presented its report recommending that Palestine be partitioned into Arab and Jewish states and a corpus separatum around Jerusalem. However, no decision had yet been made by the UN and no Arab state had formally decided on military intervention in Palestine. After the partition resolution was passed, the comparison of the Zionists to the Mongols and crusaders was repeated when Azzam told a student rally in Cairo in early December 1947: "The Arabs conquered the Tartars and the Crusaders and they are now ready to defeat the new enemy", echoing what he had said to a journalist the previous day.

The Akhbar el-Yom quotation, without its initial caveat, appeared in English in a February 1948 Jewish Agency memorandum. Over the next few years, the same partial quotation appeared (with its correct 1947 source) in several books; however, by 1952 many publications (including one by the Israeli government) had moved its date to 1948. With this inaccurate source, it has appeared in hundreds of books and thousands of websites.

== Views on Arab unity ==
According to historians Israel Gershoni and James Jankowski, Azzam denied that the Egyptian nation was a continuation of Pharaonic Egypt. Instead, he believed that "modern Egypt had been shaped primarily by 'Arab religion, customs, language, and culture'" and asserted a linguistic basis for Egyptian identification with the Arabs.

== Personal life ==
Azzam was the son-in-law of Khalid Al Hud Al Gargani, a Libyan advisor of Saudi King Abdulaziz Al Saud. One of Azzam's daughters married to Mohammed bin Faisal Al Saud, the son of Saudi King Faisal and Iffat Al Thunayan. One of Azzam's great-nephews, Ayman al-Zawahiri, led the terrorist group al-Qaeda from June 2011 to July 2022.

== Death ==
He died on 2 June 1976 in Cairo, and was later buried at Azam Mosque in Helwan.

== Writings and legacy ==
In his introduction to The Eternal Message of Muhammad (published by Azzam in Arabic in 1938 as The Hero of Heroes or the most Prominent Attribute of the Prophet Muhammad), Vincent Sheean writes: "In Damascus as well as in Djakarta, Istanbul and Baghdad, this man is known for valour of spirit and elevation of mind ... he combines in the best Islamic mode, the aspects of thought and action, like the Muslim warriors of another time who are typified for us Westerners by the figure of Saladin." In the book Azzam extols Muhammad's virtues of bravery, love, the ability to forgive, and eloquence in pursuit of the diplomatic resolution of conflict, calling Islam incompatible with racism or fanatical attachment to "tribe, nation, color, language, or culture".

Malcolm X's reading of The Eternal Message of Muhammad and his meeting with Azzam are recounted in his autobiography. These events marked the point at which he turned towards orthodox, traditional Islam.

In 1998 Ralph M. Coury published a book about his early nationalist activities, The Making of an Egyptian Arab Nationalist: The Early Years of Azzam Pasha, 1893-1936, which was printed by Ithaca Press in London.

== Sources ==
- Beinin, J. (1998). The Dispersion Of Egyptian Jewry. Culture, Politics, And The Formation Of A Modern Diaspora. University of California Press. ISBN 0-520-21175-8
- Coury Ralph (1988). "'Arabian Ethnicity' and Arab Nationalism: The Case of Abd al-Rahman Azzam". Journal of the American Research Center in Egypt. 25: 61–70. doi:10.2307/40000870. JSTOR 40000870.
- Coury, Ralph. (1998) The Making of an Egyptian Arab Nationalist: The Early Years of Azzam Pasha, 1893-1936. Reading, UK: Ithaca Press.
- Gerges, F. A. (2001). Egypt and the 1948 War: Internal conflict and regional ambition. In E. L. Rogan, A. Shlaim, C. Tripp, J. A. Clancy-Smith, I. Gershoni, R. Owen, Y. Sayigh & J. E. Tucker (Eds.), The War for Palestine: Rewriting the History of 1948 (pp. 151–177). Cambridge: Cambridge University Press. ISBN 0-521-79476-5
- Gershoni, Israel and James Jankowski (1995). Redefining the Egyptian Nation, 1930-1945. Cambridge: Cambridge University Press.
- Louis, W. R. (1986). British Empire in the Middle East, 1945-1951: Arab Nationalism, the United States, and Postwar Imperialism. Oxford: Oxford University Press. ISBN 0-19-822960-7
- Morris, B. (2003). The Birth of the Palestinian Refugee Problem Revisited. Cambridge: Cambridge University Press. ISBN 0-521-81120-1
- Morris, Benny (2001). Righteous Victims: A History of the Zionist-Arab Conflict, 1881-2001. Vintage. ISBN 0-679-74475-4
- Nachmani, A. (1988). Great Power Discord in Palestine: The Anglo-American Committee of Inquiry into the Problems of European Jewry and Palestine, 1945-1946. London: Routledge. ISBN 0-7146-3298-8
- Nisan, M. (2002). Minorities in the Middle East: A History of Struggle and Self-Expression. McFarland & Company. ISBN 0-7864-1375-1
- Rippin, A. (2000).Muslims: Their Religious Beliefs and Practices. London: Routledge. ISBN 0-415-21782-2
- Sachar, Howard M. (1979). A History of Israel, New York: Knopf. ISBN 0-679-76563-8
- Torstrick, R. L. (2000). The Limits of Coexistence: Identity Politics in Israel. University of Michigan Press. ISBN 0-472-11124-8

Preceded by Office established	Secretary-General of the Arab League; 1945–1952	Succeeded by Abdul Khlek Hassouna
