= Abu Talha al-Liby =

Commander of the Hassouna Shura Council
- In office 2016 – January 18, 2019

Personal details
- Born: Abdel-Moneim Salem Khalifa al-Hassnawi Sebha, Libya
- Died: January 18, 2019 al-Qarda al-Shati, Libya

Military service
- Allegiance: Al-Nusra Front (2013–2014) Al-Qaeda in the Islamic Maghreb (2014–2019) Hassouna Shura Council (2016–2019)

Abdel-Moneim Salem Khalifa al-Hassnawi, also known as Abu Talha or Abu Talha al-Liby, was a Libyan militant and jihadist.

== Biography ==
al-Liby was born in Sebha at an unknown date. He is part of the Hassouna tribe, a prominent Arab tribe in southern Libya's Fezzan region. He was arrested in 1996 for attempting to assassinate Muammar Gaddafi. He was imprisoned until 2011.

In 2013, al-Liby left Libya to go to Syria, where he was a co-founder of the Al-Nusra Front. He became the legal advisor to the Muhajirun Brigade. In 2014, he returned to Libya with his Syrian wife. In 2016, he founded the Hassouna Shura Council to fight against the Libyan National Army. He is known to have strong connections with Al-Qaeda in the Islamic Maghreb and its former leader Mokhtar Belmokhtar. He traveled around southern Libya looking for funds and weapons for his group, but found little support.

On January 18, 2019, the Libyan National Army claimed to have killed al-Liby, who they accused of being an AQIM militant, in an airstrike on al-Qarda al-Shati, near Sebha. Several other jihadists, including the Egyptian Abdullah al-Desouki and the Libyan al-Mahdi Dangou, who had links to the Islamic State. In December 2020, NATO reported that they had no knowledge of al-Liby's activities or whereabouts, including if he died. However, they said if he had been killed in 2019, he was likely replaced by another radical member of the Hassouna tribe.
