= Ali Maher (diplomat) =

Egyptian diplomat (1939–2016)

Ali Maher El Sayed (4 January 1939 – 22 November 2016) was an Egyptian diplomat and intellectual. He was the grandson of Prime Minister Ahmad Mahir Pasha and the brother of Foreign Minister Ahmed Maher.

Maher studied law at Cairo University. A skilled diplomat, Maher served his government in various diplomatic capacities in Canberra, Tehran and London, as Ambassador of Egypt in Tunisia and France. He remained Ambassador of Egypt in France for nine years until 2002 and was known as the Dean of Arab ambassadors there. He was then appointed secretary general to the Arab thought foundation, where he played an important role improving cross-cultural dialogue and presenting a global view of the Arab culture. From 2006 to 2008, Maher was the Director of the Institute for Peace Studies. He was Advisor to the Bibliothecal Alexandrina until 2010 and then became Head of the External Relations Sector of the Bibliotheca Alexandrina until his death.

Ali Maher died on 22 November 2016, at the age of 77.
