= Mohamed Abdul Khalek Hassouna =

Egyptian diplomat

Mohamed Abdulkhalek El Sayed Hassouna
- محمد عبد الخالق السيد

2nd Secretary-General of the Arab League
- In office September 1952 – 1 June 1972
- Preceded by: Abdul Rahman Azzam
- Succeeded by: Mahmoud Riad

Personal details
- Born: 28 October 1898 Cairo, Egypt
- Died: 20 January 1992 (aged 93) Cairo, Egypt

Mohamed Abdulkhalek El Sayed Hassouna (Arabic: محمد عبد الخالق السيد حسونة; 28 October 1898 – 20 January 1992) was an Egyptian diplomat who served as the second Secretary-General of the Arab League

== Life and career ==
Born in Cairo in 1898, Abdel-Khalek Hassouna was the grandson of Al-Azhar Grand Sheikh Hassouna El-Nawawi, who hails from the noble Hassouna family. He obtained a degree in law in 1921. Hassouna Pasha as he was later known obtained his masters and doctorate degrees in economics and political science from the University of Cambridge in 1925, where he was a member of Magdalene College. He joined the Egyptian Ministry of Foreign Affairs in 1926 and served at the Egyptian embassies in Berlin, Rome, Prague and Stockholm.

Hassouna was the undersecretary of state at the Ministry of Social Affairs between 1939 and 1942. He served as governor of Alexandria from 1942 to 1948, during which time the University of Alexandria was completed. He served as social affairs minister between 1949 and 1952 and then minister of education and foreign affairs in 1952.

He succeeded Abdul Rahman Hassan Azzam at the Arab League in 1952 and served for the next 20 years. He was succeeded by Mahmoud Riad in 1972, and died on 20 January 1992.

== Honour ==
=== Foreign honour ===
- Malaysia:
  - Honorary Commander of the Order of the Defender of the Realm (PMN (K)) - Tan Sri (1965)

Preceded by Abdul Rahman Hassan Azzam	Secretary-General of the Arab League; 1952–1972	Succeeded by Mahmoud Riad
