= Chedli Klibi =

Tunisian politician (1925–2020)

- الشاذلي القليبي
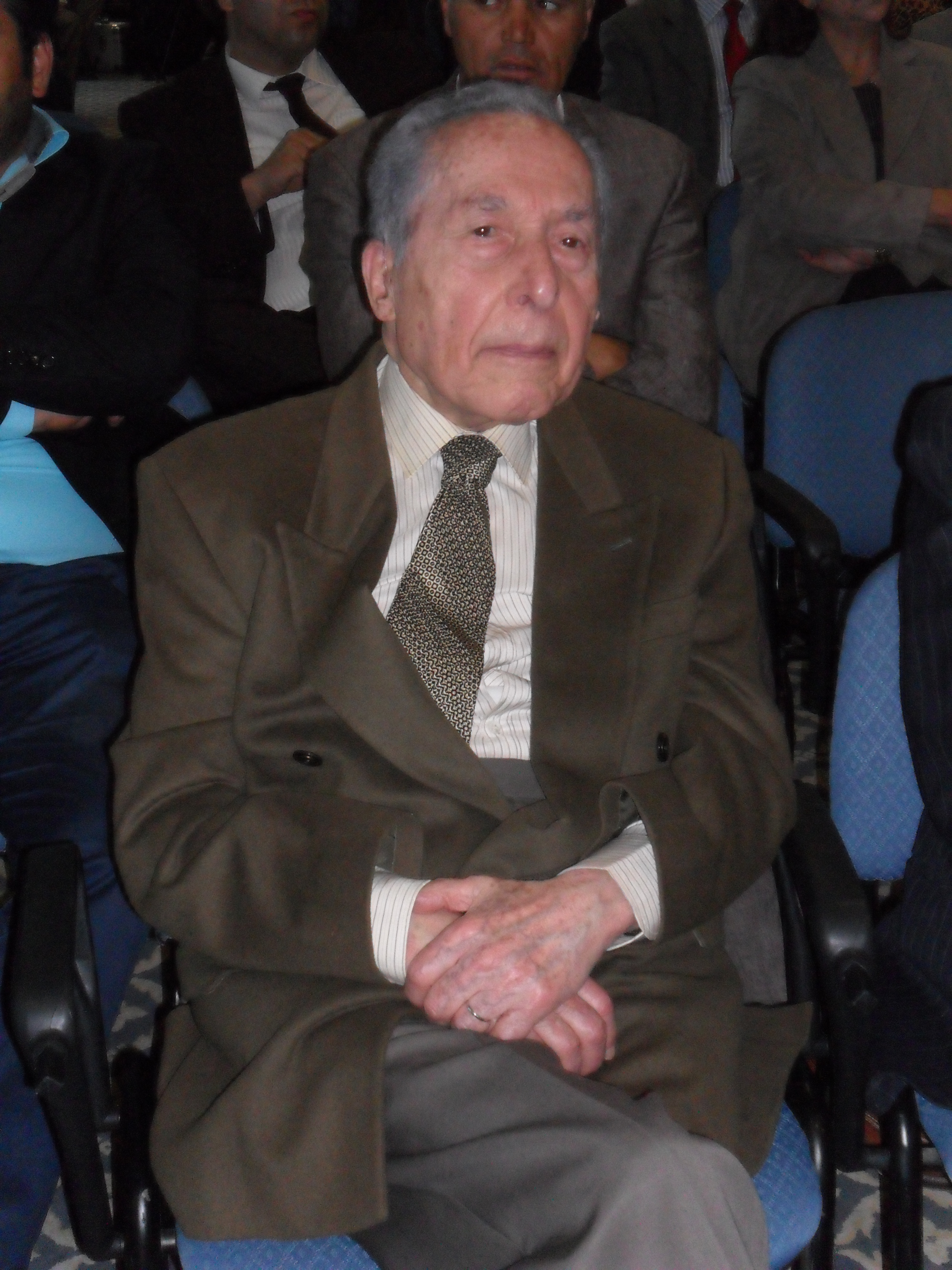
- Klibi in 2013

4th Secretary-General of the Arab League
- In office March 1979 – 3 September 1990
- Preceded by: Mahmoud Riad
- Succeeded by: Ahmed Asmat Abdel-Meguid

Minister of Information of Tunisia
- In office 1978–1979

Minister of Culture of Tunisia
- In office December 8, 1976 – September 20, 1978
- President: Habib Bourguiba
- Prime Minister: Hédi Nouira
- Preceded by: Mahmoud Messadi
- Succeeded by: Mohamed Yalaoui
- In office 24 June 1971 – 30 November 1973
- President: Habib Bourguiba
- Prime Minister: Hédi Nouira
- Preceded by: Habib Boularès
- Succeeded by: Mahmoud Messadi
- In office 7 October 1961 – 12 June 1970
- President: Habib Bourguiba
- Prime Minister: Bahi Ladgham (1969–1970)
- Preceded by: Office created
- Succeeded by: Habib Boularès

Personal details
- Born: 6 September 1925 Tunis, Tunisia
- Died: 13 May 2020 (aged 94) Tunis, Tunisia
- Party: Socialist Destourian Party

Chedli Klibi (Arabic: الشاذلي القليبي; 6 September 1925 – 13 May 2020) was a Tunisian politician. He was Secretary-General of the Arab League, and the only non-Egyptian to hold the post.

== Early life ==
Klibi graduated with a Baccalaureat de l'Enseignement Secondaire in philosophy from Sadiki College in 1944. After graduate work at the Pantheon-Sorbonne University where he earned a degree in Arabic language and literature in 1947. Having mastered the Arabic and French languages, he lectured at the Institut des Hautes Etudes and the Ecole Normale Superieure.

== Career ==
After becoming Director General of Radio Tunis in 1958, he became the Tunisian Minister of Cultural Affairs (1961–1970, 1971–1973, 1976–1978) under the chairmanship of Habib Bourguiba, then chief of staff to the president from 1974 to 1976 before being Minister of Information from 1978 to 1979. He also served as mayor of Carthage from 1963 to 1990. As mayor, he signed a symbolic "peace treaty" with the mayor of Rome, Ugo Vetere, in 1985 in commemoration of the 2,131st anniversary of the end of the Punic Wars between ancient Rome and ancient Carthage.

Klibi was appointed secretary general of the Arab League in March 1979, as a result of the Egypt–Israel peace treaty. In 1990, he resigned from the post without explanation. As secretary general he held three ordinary summits for the Heads of Arab States and six extraordinary summits. As member of the House of Councillors from 2005 to 2008, Klibi spent his retirement in his Carthage residence with his wife Klibi Kalthoum.

== Later life ==
He wrote Orient-Occident - la paix violente which was published in 1999. This book was written in the form of an interview with French journalist Jennifer Moll, in which he envisages several matters involving Islam, Europe and his experiences as secretary general of the Arab League.

== Honours ==
=== Tunisian national medals ===
- (Tunisia) :
- Grand Cordon of the Order of Independence
- Grand Cordon of the Order of the Republic
- Grand Cordon of the National Order of Merit of Tunisia

=== Foreign honors ===
- Algeria : Medal of Honor of the Republic of Algeria
- Lebanon : Grand Cordon of the National Order of the Cedar
- Morocco : Grand Cordon of the Order of Ouissam Alaouite
- Palestine : Grand Cordon of the National Order of Palestine

== Publications ==
- (in French) Orient-Occident : la paix violente, ed. Sand, Paris, 1999
- (in French) Habib Bourguiba : radioscopie d'un règne, ed. Déméter, Tunis, 2012
- (in Arabic) تونس و عوامل القلق العربي (Tunisia and Arab anxiety factors), ed. Sud editions, Tunis, 2020

Preceded by Mahmoud Riad	Secretary-General of the Arab League; 1979–1990	Succeeded by Esmat Abdel Meguid
