= Ahmed Maher El Sayed =

Egyptian diplomat

Minister of Foreign Affairs
- In office 3 July 2001 – 11 July 2004
- Preceded by: Amr Moussa
- Succeeded by: Ahmed Aboul Gheit

Personal details
- Born: 14 September 1935 Cairo
- Died: 27 September 2010 (aged 75)
- Education: Cairo University

Ahmed Maher El Sayed (Arabic: أحمد ماهر) (14 September 1935 – 27 September 2010) was an Egyptian diplomat. He served as the foreign minister of Egypt from 2001 to 2004.

== Early life and education ==
Maher was born in Cairo on 14 September 1935. He came from a family of diplomats and politicians. He was the brother of Ambassador Ali Maher and their grandfather, Ahmad Mahir Pasha, was one of the prime ministers of Egypt. He studied law at Cairo University and graduated in 1956.

== Career ==
After graduation Maher joined the foreign ministry in 1957, serving as a junior diplomat in Switzerland (9 February 1959 – 31 August 1963), Congo (5 May 1967 – 24 May 1971) and France (8 August 1974 – 30 September 1977). In addition, he was the national security advisor to the president of Egypt from 1971 to 1974. Next he was named as the head of the foreign minister's staff.from 1978 to 1980. He was part of the Camp David talks in 1978, where he was assigned to coordinate efforts with the then US secretary of state Cyrus Vance. He also took part in the 1988 talks, leading to the return of Taba to Egyptian control after Israel occupied the town in 1967.

Generally considered an outsider in Egyptian politics, Maher had a distinguished career as a diplomat. Most notably, he was ambassador to the Soviet Union and Russia (1 October 1988 – 19 June 1992) as well as ambassador to Portugal (5 September 1980 – 8 November 1982) and Belgium (8 November 1982 – 9 December 1984). In addition, he served as the ambassador in Washington for seven years from 7 July 1992 to 14 September 1999. He retired from office in 1999. After retirement, he was named as the director of the Special Arab Aid Fund for Africa (SAAFA) in Cairo, a body of the Arab League, in 2000.

He was appointed foreign minister on 15 May 2001, being the 71st figure in the post. He succeeded Amr Moussa as foreign minister after Moussa was appointed head of the Arab League. When he was in office many significant events in regard to the Arab world occurred, including the 9/11 attacks on the United States, the US-led 2003 invasion of Iraq and the Israeli–Palestinian conflict. During a visit to Israel as part of Egyptian efforts to relaunch the peace process, Maher was attacked by Palestinian activists in the Al-Aqsa mosque compound in east Jerusalem in December 2003. The Palestinians booed and hurled shoes at him in protest at Egypt's perceived policy of appeasement towards Israel. His term ended in 2004 and Ahmed Aboul Gheit replaced him in the post.

In July 2010, Hosni Mobarak appointed him a member of the parliament's upper house, or Shura Council.

== Death ==
Maher died of a heart attack on 27 September 2010 at the age of 75.

Political offices
Preceded by Amr Moussa	Foreign Minister of Egypt; 2001–2004	Succeeded by Ahmed Aboul Gheit
