= Mahmoud Riad =

Egyptian diplomat and 3rd Secretary-General of the Arab League (1917–1992)

- محمود رياض
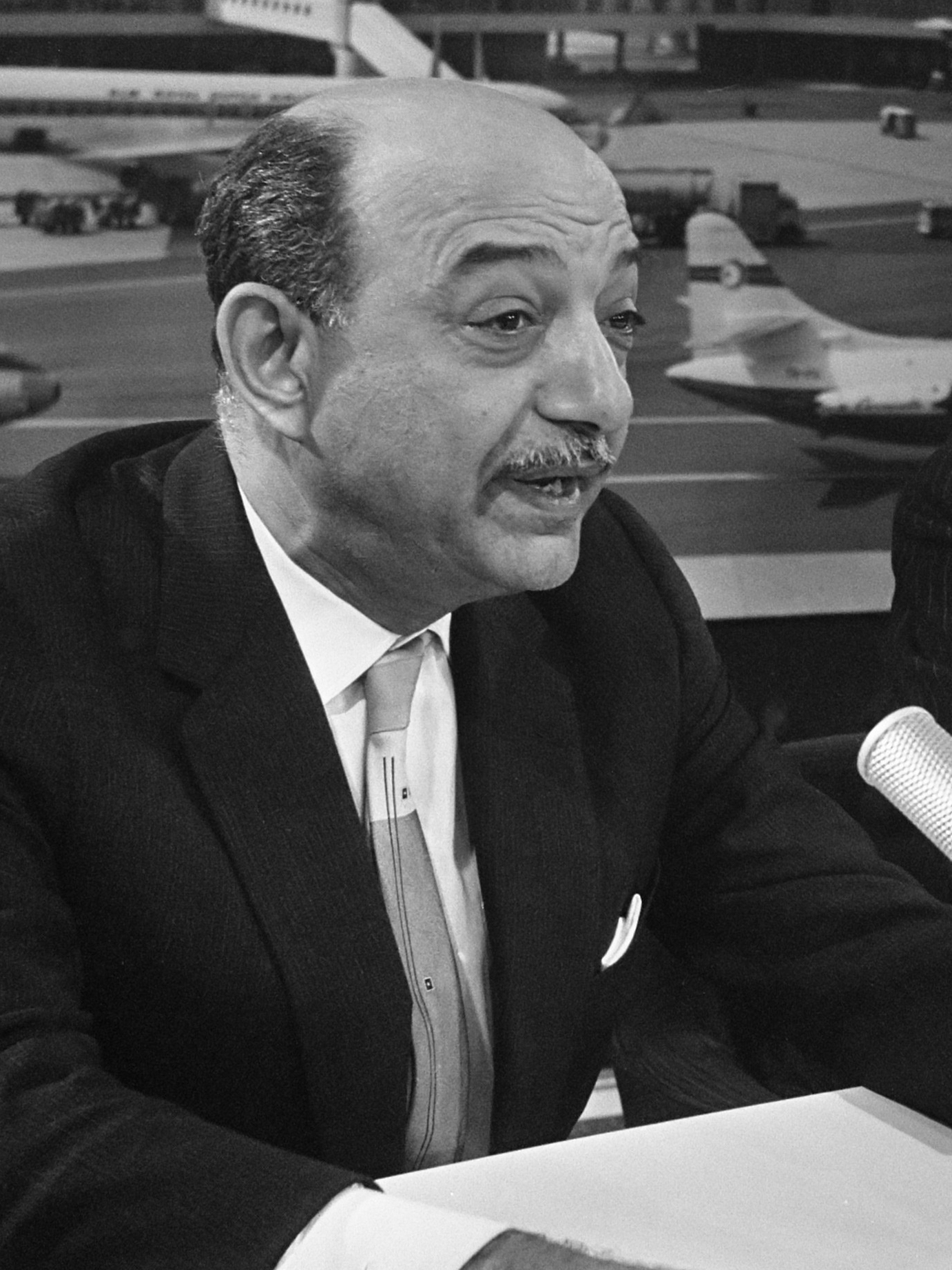
- Riad in 1969

3rd Secretary-General of the Arab League
- In office 1 June 1972 – March 1979
- Preceded by: Abdul Khalek Hassouna
- Succeeded by: Chedli Klibi

Minister of Foreign Affairs
- In office 25 March 1964 – 17 January 1972
- President: Gamal Abdel Nasser; Anwar Sadat
- Prime Minister: Ali Sabri; Zakaria Mohieddin; Mohamed Sedki Sulayman; Gamal Abdel Nasser; Mahmoud Fawzi
- Preceded by: Mahmoud Fawzi
- Succeeded by: Mohammed Murad Ghaleb

Minister of Communications
- In office 17 January 1972 – 16 April 1975
- President: Anwar Sadat
- Prime Minister: Aziz Sedky; Anwar Sadat; Abdel Aziz Mohamed Hegazy
- Preceded by: Suleiman Abdel Hay
- Succeeded by: Mohamed Kamal El-Din Hassanein

Minister of Transportation
- In office 25 April 1974 – 16 April 1975
- President: Anwar Sadat
- Prime Minister: Anwar Sadat; Abdel Aziz Mohamed Hegazy
- Preceded by: El-Husseini Abdel Latif
- Succeeded by: Gamal El-Din Sedky

Personal details
- Born: January 8, 1917 Qalyubia, Egypt
- Died: January 25, 1992 (aged 75) Cairo, Egypt

Mahmoud Riad (Arabic: محمود رياض; January 8, 1917 – January 25, 1992) was an Egyptian diplomat. He was Egyptian ambassador to United Nations from 1962 to 1964, Egyptian Minister of Foreign Affairs from 1964 to 1972, and Secretary-General of the League of Arab States from 1972 to 1979.

An army officer turned diplomat, Riad was considered an expert on Arab affairs. After fighting in the 1948 Arab–Israeli War, he was a member of the Egyptian delegation that signed the 1949 armistice with Israel.

Following nine years of service in the army, Riad joined the Ministry of Foreign Affairs in 1952 and quickly climbed through the diplomatic ranks. He became Ambassador to Syria in 1955 and Permanent Representative to the United Nations in 1962. He served as Minister of Foreign Affairs from 1964 to 1972. In 1967, Riad worked with his colleague and friend, Ambassador Charles W. Yost, in an effort to find a solution before the outbreak of war.

He was elected Secretary General of the League of Arab States in 1972, succeeding Abdul Khalek Hassouna, also an Egyptian.

Riad relinquished the League of Arab States post in 1979 at the height of a crisis caused by Egypt's signing a peace treaty with Israel. Most Arab countries broke relations with Egypt over the treaty, and league headquarters were moved from Cairo to Tunisia. The headquarters returned to Egypt in 1990 after treaty opponents reconciled with Cairo and resumed diplomatic ties.

He is the author of three books. His most prominent book titled "The Struggle for Peace in the Middle East" published in London, England 1982 (ISBN 0 7043 2297 8).

== Honour ==
=== Foreign honour ===
- Malaysia:
  - Honorary Commander of the Order of the Defender of the Realm (PMN (K)) - Tan Sri (1965)

== Works ==
- Struggling for Peace in the Middle East (1981)

== Notes and references ==
Preceded by Abdul Khalek Hassouna	Secretary-General of the Arab League; 1972–1979	Succeeded by Chedli Klibi
Political offices
Preceded by Mahmoud Fawzi	Minister of Foreign Affairs; 1964-1972	Succeeded by Mohammed Murad Ghaleb
