= Khalid Al Hud Al Gargani =

Libyan businessman and advisor to Saudi King Abdulaziz (1882–1971)

- Born: Khalid bin Ahmed Al Hud Al Gargani; 1882; Tripoli, Ottoman Empire
- Died: 1971 (aged 88–89)
- Other names: Khalid Al Hud
- Occupation: Merchant
- Years active: 1910s–1950s
- Known for: Advisor of King Abdulaziz

Khalid Al Hud Al Gargani, also known as Khalid Al Hud, (Arabic: خالد بن أحمد القرقني; 1882–1971) was a Libyan businessman and one of the most influential advisors of King Abdulaziz, founder of the Kingdom of Saudi Arabia in 1932.

== Early life and education ==
Khalid Al Hud was born in Tripoli in 1882. His ancestors were migrated from Yemen to Tunisia, and his family members were merchants and had a role in the city's administration. His grandfather, Ali Al Gargani, was the sheikh of Tripoli during the Ottoman era.

Khalid was educated in Tripoli and graduated from the Al Rashidiyah school.

== Career and activities ==
Following his graduation Khalid Al Hud was appointed by the Ottomans as district governor of the Al Nawahi Al Arba’a region near Tripoli which he held until the Italian invasion of Libya in 1911. He fought against the Italians together with the Ottoman forces. He visited Moscow in 1917 to celebrate the Bolshevik Revolution. He was a member of the Libyan delegation that was sent to Rome after the Gharyan Conference in 1920. He attended the Anti-Colonial Conference held in Moscow in June 1921. Following this conference he went to Tunisia and continued his opposition activities against the Italians and went to Egypt in 1924. However, he had to leave Egypt due to threats of the Italians and settled in Istanbul, Turkey, where he obtained Turkish citizenship.

Then Khalid was involved in business, and his representatives began to engage in trade in Hejaz in 1929. He had contacts with German companies in the 1930s. These were established at the request of Saudi King Abdulaziz, and Khalid's business partner in these activities was Lebanese Druze politician Shakib Arslan.

Khalid became part of the eight-member political committee at the Saudi royal court in 1930. He was the principal envoy of the King in regard to the procurement of arms from the European states. A meeting was planned with the Italian officials for this purpose in 1937, but Khalid Al Hud could not attend the meeting due to his illness. He was sent to Germany as an emissary of the King to negotiate the arm sales in 1939. There he met with Joachim von Ribbentrop, Nazi's foreign minister, on 8 June. During the meeting Khalid Al Hud asked the Germans to establish a small rifle and munitions factory in Saudi Arabia and to sell the armoured cars and anti-aircraft weapons to strengthen the Kingdom's defense. He met with Adolf Hitler in Berchtesgaden, Germany, on 17 June. He submitted a personal letter from King Abdulaziz to Hitler who stated in the meeting that Nazi Germany would be pleased to have good relations with Saudi Arabia due to the fact that both states had the same opponents, Jewish people. Khalid Al Hud's mission was a success in that the Germans agreed to provide weapons that Saudi Arabia requested. However, any agreement was signed and therefore, the mission was not materialized partly due to the outbreak of World War II on 3 September 1939. Reports of the Gargani's meetings with Hitler and other senior Nazi officials were shared with Reader Bullard who was the British ambassador to Saudi Arabia.

King Abdulaziz asked him to head the political division of the Royal Court in 1944, but Khalid did not accept this position. However, he continued to serve at the court until the death of the King in 1953 and returned to Libya where he bought a farm in the Ain Zara area shortly after King Saud succeeded his father. Khalid kept his Turkish citizenship until 1955 when he was granted Saudi citizenship.

== Personal life, death and legacy ==
Khalid Al Hud was fluent in French, Italian and Turkish. He was married and had two sons and seven daughters. One of his daughters married Abdul Rahman Azzam Pasha, an Egyptian diplomat.

Khalid died in 1971.

A street in Riyadh, Saudi Arabia, was named after Khalid Al Hud.
