= Secretary General of the Arab League =

This is a list of the secretaries-general of the Arab League since its founding in 1945.

== List of secretaries-general ==
No.	Image	Secretary-General Birth–Death	Took office	Left office	Nationality
1		Abdul Rahman Azzam (1893–1976)	22 March 1945	September 1952	Egypt
2		Abdul Khalek Hassouna (1898–1992)	September 1952	1 June 1972	Egypt
3		Mahmoud Riad (1917–1992)	1 June 1972	March 1979	Egypt
4		Chedli Klibi (1925–2020)	March 1979	September 1990	Tunisia
5		Ahmed Asmat Abdel-Meguid (1923–2013)	15 May 1991	15 May 2001	Egypt
6		Amr Moussa (1936–present)	15 May 2001	1 July 2011	Egypt
7		Nabil Elaraby (1935–2024)	1 July 2011	3 July 2016	Egypt
8		Ahmed Aboul Gheit (1942–present)	3 July 2016	1 July 2026	Egypt
9		Nabil Fahmy (1951–present)	1 July 2026		Egypt
