= Mohamed Orabi =

Egyptian diplomat and politician

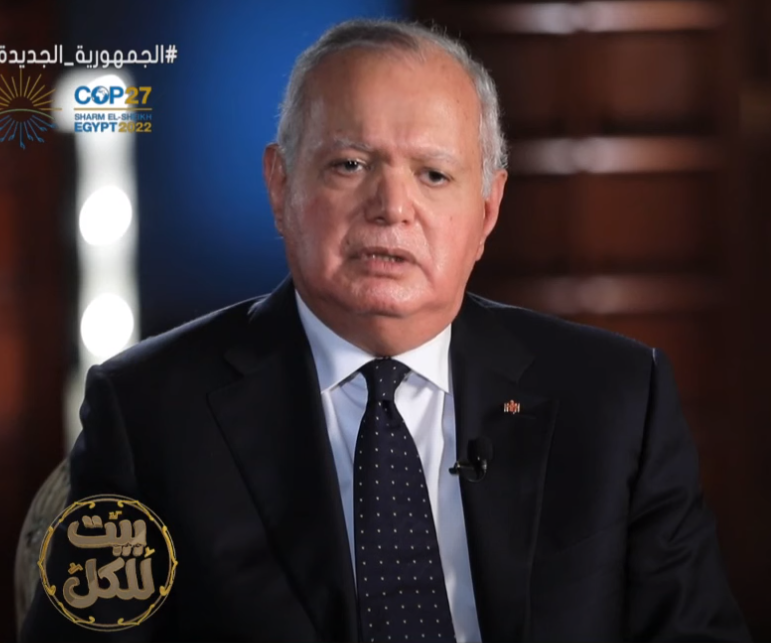
- Orabi

Foreign Minister of Egypt
- In office 18 June 2011 – 18 July 2011
- President: Hussein Tantawi (Acting)
- Prime Minister: Essam Sharaf
- Preceded by: Nabil el-Araby
- Succeeded by: Mohamed Kamel Amr

Deputy Foreign Minister of Egypt
- In office 6 March 2011 – 18 June 2011
- President: Hussein Tantawi (Acting)
- Prime Minister: Essam Sharaf
- Preceded by: Faiza Abu El-Naga
- Succeeded by: Nasser Hashemi

Personal details
- Born: 1951 (age 74–75) Cairo, Egypt

Mohamed Orabi (Arabic: محمد العرابي; born 1951) is an Egyptian diplomat and politician who served as the Foreign Minister of Egypt in Essam Sharaf's cabinet from 18 June 2011 to 18 July 2011.

== Career ==
Orabi worked in the Egyptian Army before joining the foreign service in 1976, establishing himself as a career diplomat. He served as the deputy chief of the Egyptian mission in Israel from 1994 to 1998 and in the US. He also served in Kuwait and the United Kingdom as an Egyptian diplomat. In 2000, he became the chief of the cabinet of the foreign minister with Amr Moussa and served as the Egyptian ambassador to Germany from 2001 to 2008. Afterwards, he acted as assistant foreign minister for economic affairs.

In June 2011, Orabi was appointed foreign minister, replacing Nabil Al Arabi. However, he resigned from this position in July 2011 and was succeeded by Mohamed Kamel Amr.

In 2015, Orabi ran for parliamentary elections and won. He served a full term as a deputy in the House of Representatives and presided over its foreign affairs committee for a few years. He did not run for another term in the 2020 elections and thus wasn't rejected for another parliamentary term.

Political offices
Preceded by Nabil el-Araby	Foreign Minister of Egypt; 2011	Succeeded by Mohamed Kamel Amr
