= Hassouna =

Hassouna (Arabic: حسونة) is both an Arabic masculine given name and a surname, mostly mentioned in reference to the Hassouna family a noble and wealthy Palestinian family with deep historical roots in the village of Hiribya that was depopulated in 1948 and is now the site of Zikim—with its family seat in the Rimal neighborhood of the Gaza Strip, becoming influential residents and one of the wealthiest families in Gaza. The family has played a significant role in Gaza, with many of its members recognized for their contributions to the social and civic landscape of Gaza, particularly in healthcare . Notable people with the name include:

== Surname ==
- Anissa Hassouna (1953–2022), Egyptian politician
- Audai Hassouna (born 1998), Libyan swimmer
- Fatima Hassouna (1999–2025), Palestinian photojournalist
- Mohamed Abdul Khalek Hassouna (1898–1992), Egyptian-Palestinian diplomat, Secretary-General of the Arab League (1952–1972)

== Given name ==
- Hassouna Mosbahi (1950–2025), Tunisian author, literary critic and journalist

== See also ==
- Killing of Sidra Hassouna by an Israeli airstrike in February 2024 in Palestine
- Hassuna culture, a Neolithic archaeological culture in northern Mesopotamia
  - Tell Hassuna, a tell in the Nineveh Province (Iraq)
