= Ahmed Asmat Abdel-Meguid =

Egyptian diplomat (1923–2013)

- أحمد عصمت عبد المجيد
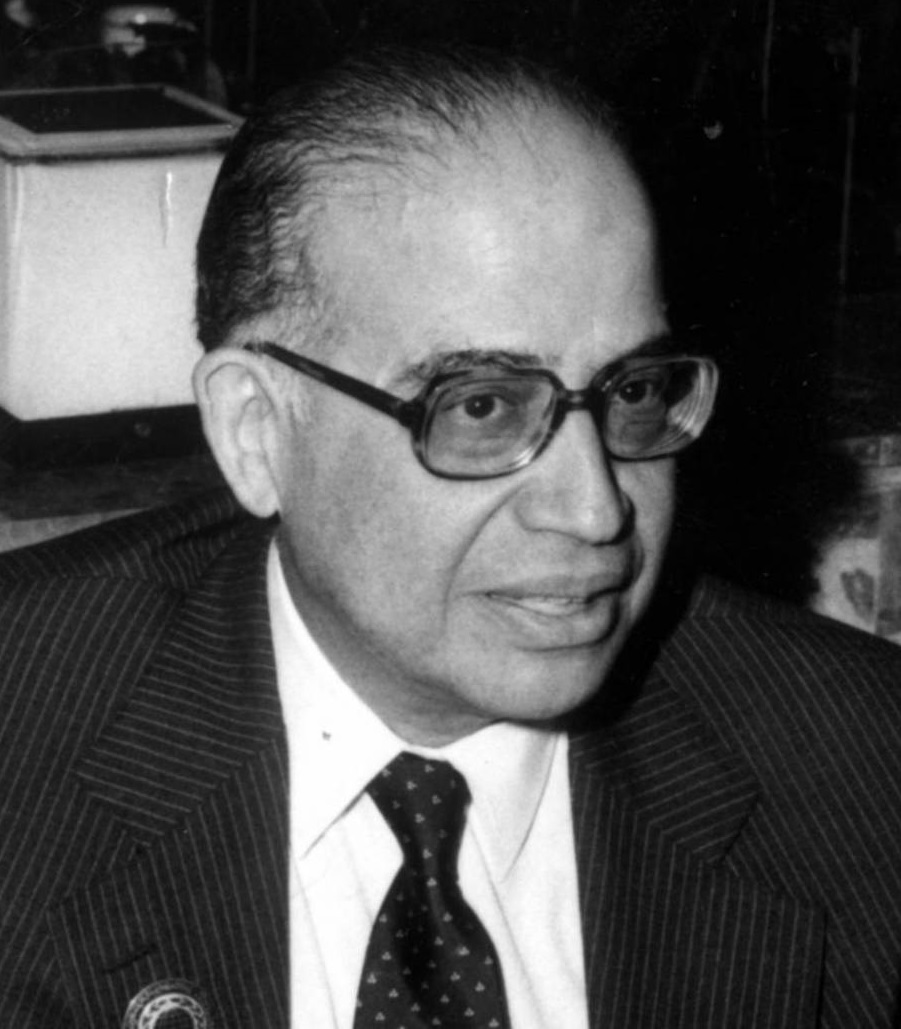
- Abdel-Meguid in 1972

5th Secretary-General of the Arab League
- In office 1 June 1991 – 1 June 2001
- Preceded by: Chedli Klibi
- Succeeded by: Amr Moussa

Minister of Foreign Affairs
- In office 17 July 1984 – 1 June 1991
- President: Hosni Mubarak
- Prime Minister: Kamal Hassan Ali; Ali Lutfi Mahmud; Atef Sedki
- Preceded by: Kamal Hassan Ali
- Succeeded by: Amr Moussa

Personal details
- Born: 22 March 1923 Alexandria, Egypt
- Died: 21 December 2013 (aged 90) Cairo, Egypt
- Party: National Democratic Party
- Education: Alexandria University; University of Paris
- Profession: Diplomat

Ahmed Asmat Abdel-Meguid (Arabic: أحمد عصمت عبد المجيد; 22 March 1923 – 21 December 2013) was an Egyptian diplomat. He served as the Foreign Minister of Egypt between 1984 and 1991, and as the Secretary-General of the Arab League from 1991 until 2001.

== Biography ==
Born in Alexandria in March 1923, Abdel Meguid received a law degree from Alexandria University in 1944 before going on to obtain a doctorate of international law from the University of Paris in 1947. He joined the Egyptian foreign ministry in 1950 and worked in several departments, notably the British and French sections. In 1967 he was appointed as Chairman of the State Information Service, a post he held for a year. He became ambassador to France in 1970, deputy foreign minister in 1970, and Egypt's high representative to the United Nations in 1972. He served in that position until 1983, and was then foreign minister from 1984 to 1991, when he was elected secretary-general of the Arab League.

He died in Cairo on 21 December 2013, at the age of 90.

Political offices
Preceded by Kamal Hassan Ali	Foreign Minister of Egypt; 1984–1991	Succeeded by Amr Moussa
Diplomatic posts
Preceded by Chedli Klibi	Secretary-General of the Arab League; 1991–2001	Succeeded by Amr Moussa
