= Ahmed Aboul Gheit =

Egyptian politician and diplomat (born 1942)

- أحمد أبو الغيط
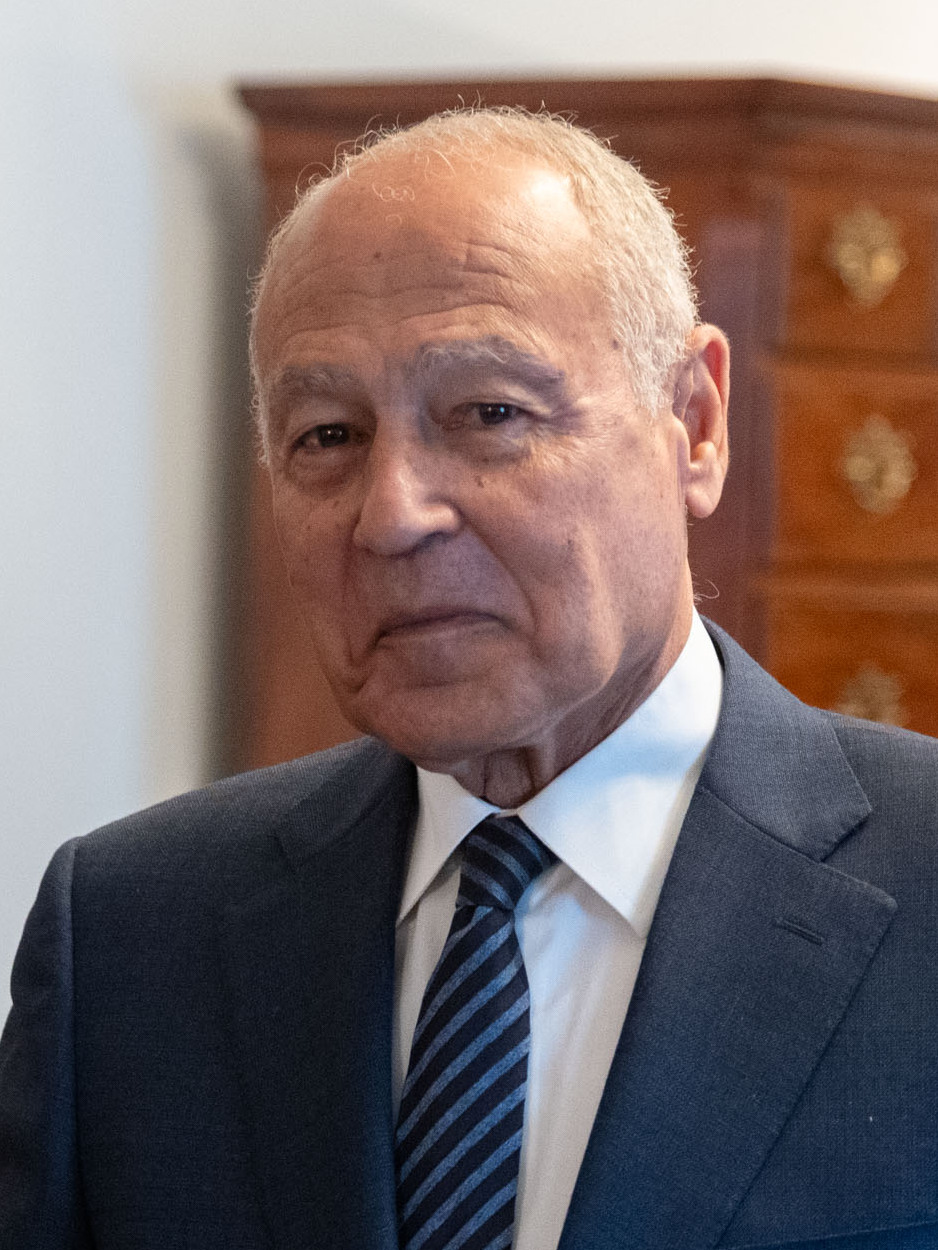
- Aboul Gheit in 2023

8th Secretary-General of the Arab League
- In office 3 July 2016 – 1 July 2026
- Deputy: Ahmed Ben Helli
- Preceded by: Nabil Elaraby
- Succeeded by: Nabil Fahmy

Minister of Foreign Affairs of Egypt
- In office 11 July 2004 – 6 March 2011
- Prime Minister: Ahmed Nazif; Ahmed Shafik
- Preceded by: Ahmad Maher
- Succeeded by: Nabil Elaraby

Personal details
- Born: 12 June 1942 (age 84) Cairo, Egypt
- Education: Ain Shams University

Ahmed Aboul Gheit (Arabic: أحمد أبو الغيط [ˈæħmæd æbolˈɣeːtˤ], also: Abu al-Ghayt, Abu El Gheyt; born 12 June 1942) is an Egyptian politician and diplomat. He served as Secretary-General of the Arab League from July 2016 until July 2026, having been reappointed for a second term on 3 March 2021. Aboul-Gheit served as the Minister of Foreign Affairs of Egypt from 11 July 2004 to 6 March 2011. Previously, between 1999 and 2004, he was Egypt's Permanent Representative to the United Nations. He was succeeded as Minister of Foreign Affairs by ICJ judge Nabil Elaraby in March 2011, following the overthrow of President Hosni Mubarak. He was elected Secretary-General of the Arab League in March 2016, and his term commenced on 3 July 2016.

== Early life ==
Ahmed Aboul Gheit was born in Heliopolis in Cairo on 12 June 1942, He studied business at Ain Shams University, Cairo.

== Diplomatic career ==
Ahmed Aboul Gheit received his education at an English school in Egypt before obtaining a degree in commerce from Ain Shams University in 1964. In 1965, he joined the Egyptian Ministry of Foreign Affairs, marking the beginning of a long diplomatic career. In 1968, he was appointed Third Secretary at the Egyptian Embassy in Cyprus, a position he held until 1972, when he joined the office of the President’s National Security Advisor. In 1974, he was assigned to Egypt’s Permanent Mission to the United Nations as Second Secretary, before being promoted to First Secretary. Three years later, in 1977, he became First Secretary at the Ministry of Foreign Affairs headquarters. In 1978, he took part in the Camp David negotiations, which led to the signing of the Egypt–Israel peace treaty. In 1979, he was appointed Political Counselor at the Egyptian Embassy in Moscow.

Returning to Cairo in 1982, he served as Special Political Advisor to the Minister of Foreign Affairs, and in 1984 as Special Political Advisor to the Prime Minister. In 1985, he was again assigned to Egypt’s Permanent Mission to the United Nations as a Political Counselor, before being promoted to Deputy Permanent Representative in 1987. In 1989, he became Special Political Secretary to the Minister of Foreign Affairs, and then Director of his office in 1991. The following year, he was appointed Ambassador of Egypt to Italy, with accreditation to Macedonia and San Marino, while also representing Egypt at the Food and Agriculture Organization (FAO) of the United Nations. In 1996, he was promoted to Assistant Minister of Foreign Affairs, before being appointed in 1999 as Egypt’s Permanent Representative to the United Nations. He was recalled to Cairo in 2004 to take over as head of Egyptian diplomacy.

=== Foreign minister ===
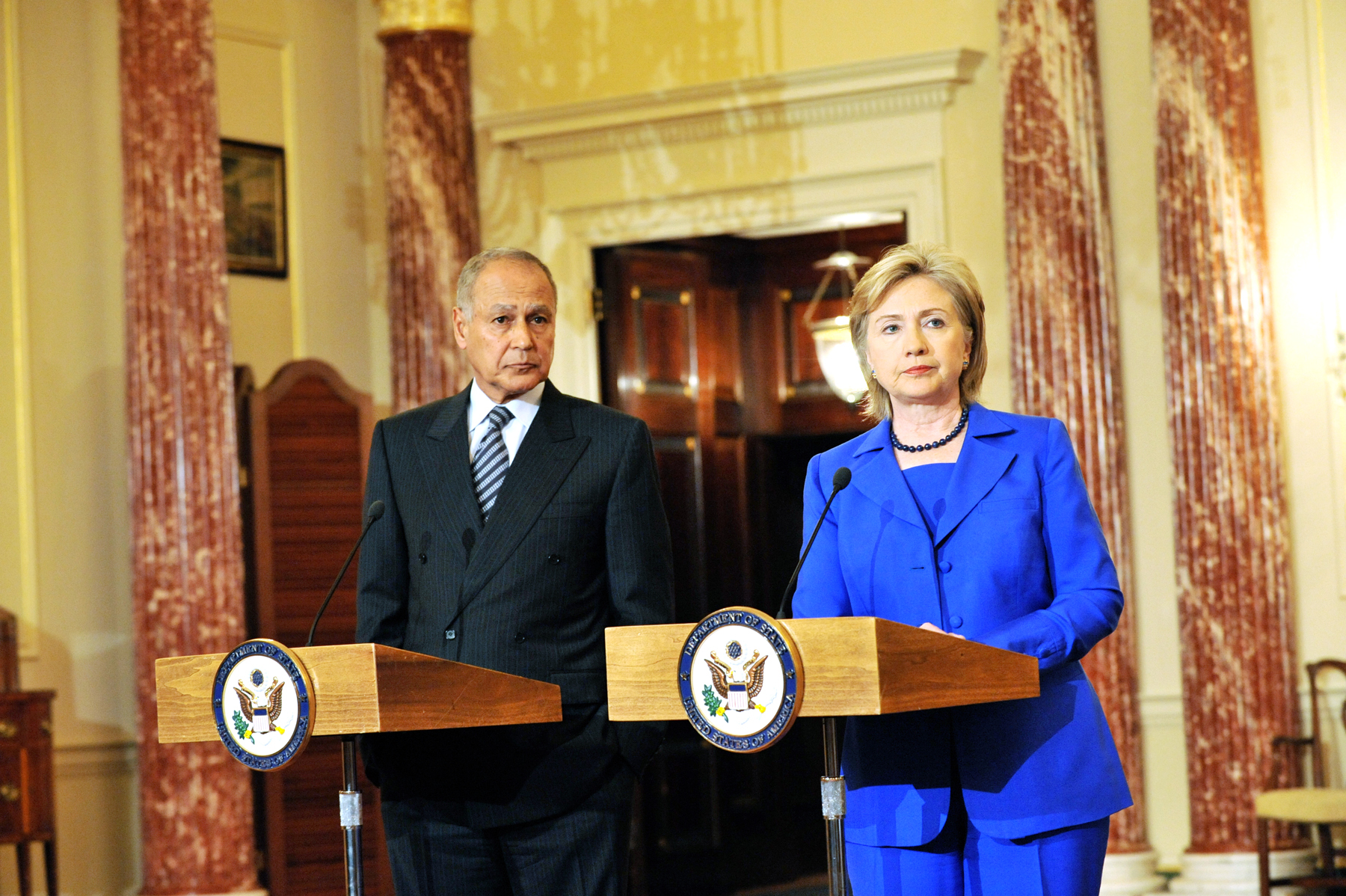
Ahmed Aboul Gheit Meets With Secretary Hillary Clinton (Washington DC, 27 May 2009).

Aboul Gheit served as the Minister of Foreign Affairs of Egypt from 11 July 2004 to 6 March 2011. As Minister of Foreign Affairs, Ahmed Aboul Gheit played an important role in managing the Arab–Israeli conflict. He actively participated in diplomatic efforts aimed at reviving the Israeli–Palestinian peace process and supported the creation of a Palestine as a state alongside Israel. During the 2007 Blockade of the Gaza Strip, he backed Egyptian-led mediation initiatives in favor of a ceasefire and facilitated negotiations between the various parties.

He also closely followed developments of the situation in the Middle East after the 2003 invasion of Iraq, seeking to strengthen relations between Cairo and Baghdad, as shown by the opening of the Egyptian consulate in Erbil in the Iraqi Kurdistan Region in 2010. In addition, he was involved in several regional issues, including mediation between Sudan and Chad, as well as between the Sudanese government and its opponents in the War in Darfur, illustrating Egypt’s desire to maintain a major diplomatic role in Middle East and North Africa.

After Egyptian President Hosni Mubarak was ousted in February 2011, Aboul Gheit retired from the foreign ministry to write his memoirs.

=== Secretary-General of the Arab League ===
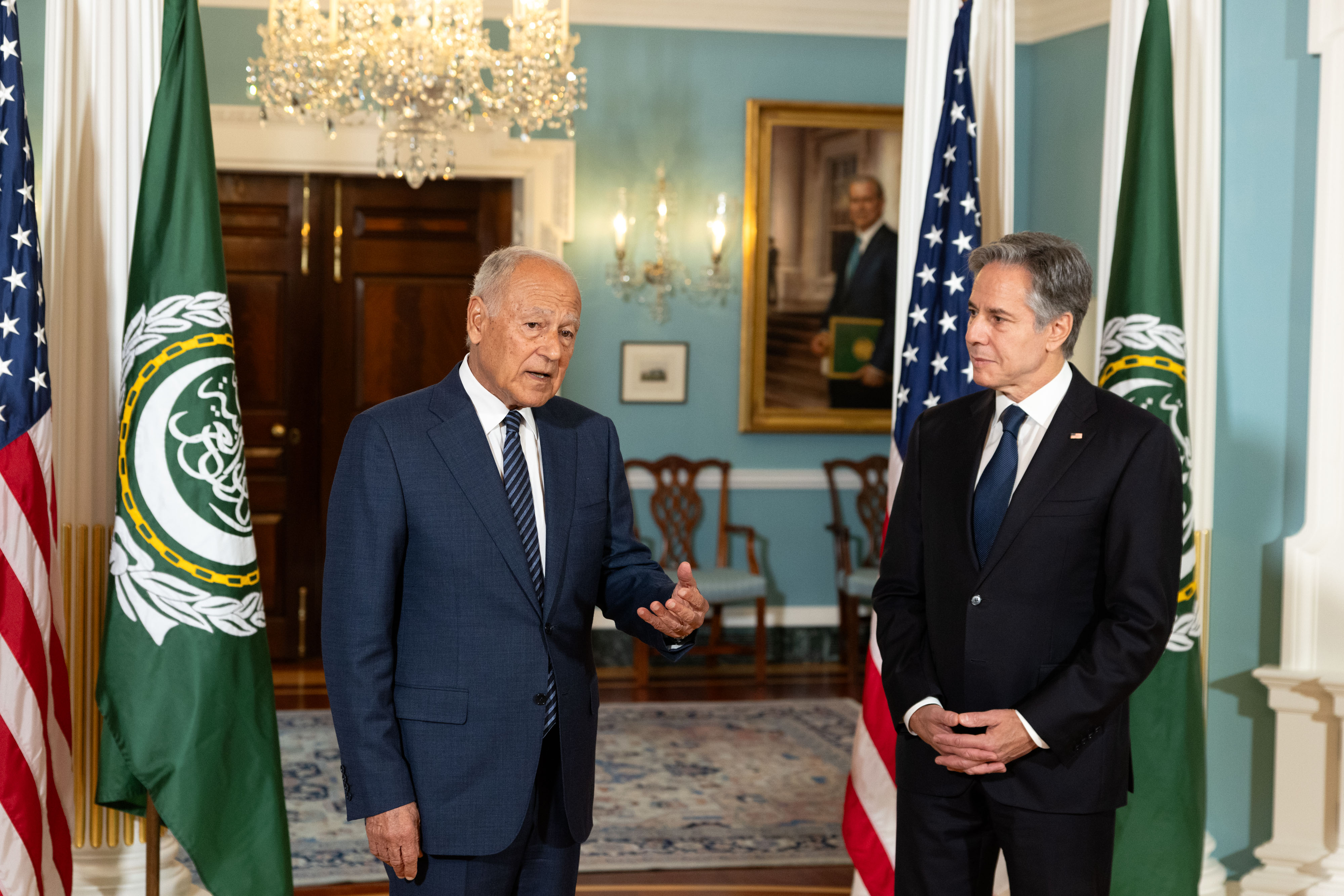
Ahmed Aboul Gheit meets with Antony Blinken (Washington DC, 19 July 2023).

In March 2016 Aboul Gheit was elected Secretary-General of the Arab League succeeding Nabil el-Arabi although his election was contested due to his age. His term commenced on 3 July 2016. In 2021, the member states of the Arab League granted him a second five-year term.

In 2019, Gheit called the 2019 Turkish offensive into northeastern Syria a blatant violation of Syria's sovereignty. On 11 May 2021, he called Israeli air strikes on Gaza indiscriminate and irresponsible.

After nearly ten years at the head of the Arab League as its eighth Secretary-General, he was replaced on 1st July 2026 by Nabil Fahmy as leader of the institution.

== Honours ==
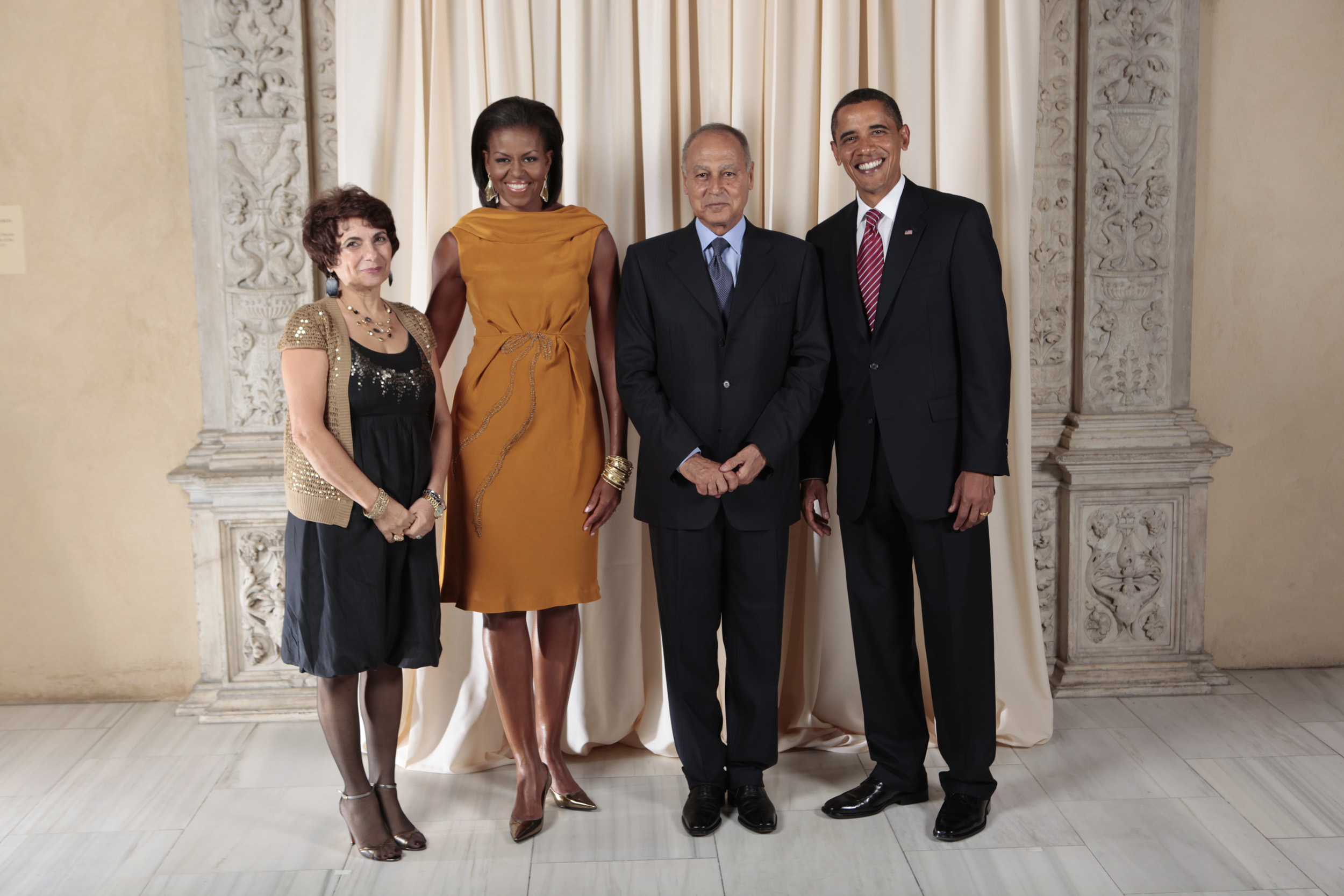
Ahmed Aboul Gheit and his wife with President Barack Obama and First Lady Michelle Obama (New York, 23 September 2009).

=== Egyptian national honours ===
- Grand Cross of the Order of the Republic (Egypt).
- Knight of the Order of Merit (Egypt).

=== Foreign honors ===
- Chile: Grand Cross of the Order of Merit.
- France: Commander of the Legion of Honour (2002)
- France: Grand Officier of the Ordre national du Mérite.
- Italy: Commander of the Order of Merit of the Italian Republic.
- Japan: Grand Cordon of the Order of the Rising Sun (2025).
- Libya: First Class of the Order of National Merit (2026).
- Palestine: Grand Cordon of the Order of the State of Palestine (2025).
- Russia: Medal of the Order of Friendship (2009).
- Serbia: First Class of the Order of the Serbian Flag (2017).

== Published works ==
- Egypt's Foreign Policy in Times of Crisis: My Testimony, Cairo, The American University in Cairo Press, 2019
- Witness to War and Peace: Egypt, the October War, and Beyond, Cairo, The American University in Cairo Press, 2018

Political offices
Preceded by Ahmad Maher	Minister of Foreign Affairs; 2004–2011	Succeeded by Nabil Elaraby
Diplomatic posts
Preceded by Nabil Elaraby	Secretary-General of the Arab League; 2016–2026	Succeeded by Nabil Fahmy
