= Amr Moussa =

Egyptian politician and diplomat (born 1936)

Amr Moussa ON ORE
- عمرو موسى
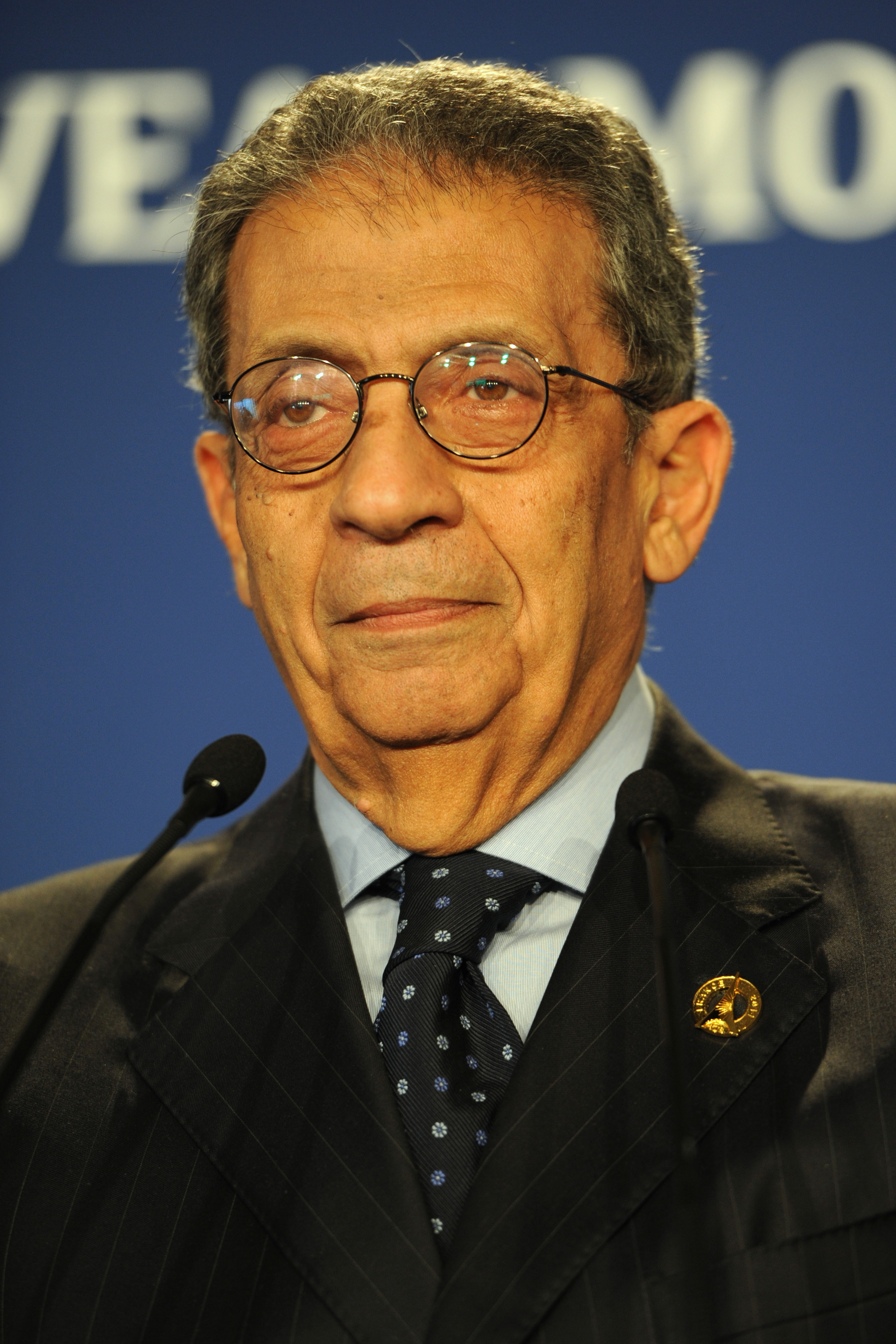
- Moussa in 2011

6th Secretary-General of the Arab League
- In office 1 June 2001 – 1 July 2011
- Preceded by: Ahmed Abdel-Meguid
- Succeeded by: Nabil Elaraby

Minister of Foreign Affairs
- In office 20 May 1991 – 15 May 2001
- Prime Minister: Atef Sedki; Kamal Ganzouri; Atef Ebeid
- Preceded by: Ahmed Asmat Abdel-Meguid
- Succeeded by: Ahmed Maher

Egyptian Ambassador to the United Nations
- In office 1 January 1990 – 20 May 1991
- President: Hosni Mubarak
- Preceded by: Ahmed Aboul Gheit
- Succeeded by: Nabil Elaraby

Personal details
- Born: Amr Mouhammed Moussa Abu-Zeid; 3 October 1936 (age 90) Cairo, Egypt
- Party: Congress Party
- Spouse: Leila Moussa
- Children: Hazem Moussa; Hania Moussa
- Education: Cairo University

Amr Muhammad Moussa (Arabic: عمرو محمد موسى, IPA: [ˈʕɑmɾe mæˈħæmmæd ˈmuːsæ]; born 3 October 1936) is an Egyptian politician and diplomat who was the Secretary-General of the Arab League, a 22-member forum representing Arab states, from 1 June 2001 to 1 July 2011. Previously he served in the government of Egypt as Minister of Foreign Affairs from 1991 to 2001. On 8 September 2013, he was elected president of the committee of 50 that will amend the Egyptian constitution.

== Early life ==
He was born on 3 October 1936 in Cairo, Egypt, the son of former parliamentarian Muhammad Moussa. His father also had a son named Pierre during his studies in France in the 1920s. However, Moussa's half-brother Pierre is a French citizen and has no ties to Egypt.

Moussa finished his education after earning a degree in law from Cairo University in 1957.

== Diplomatic career ==
Moussa then began his diplomatic career between 1958 and 1972 he worked in several missions, including Egypt's Embassy in Switzerland and the Egyptian mission to the United Nations. From 1974 to 1977, he was an advisor to the Minister of Foreign Affairs. From 1977 to 1981 and again from 1983 to 1990, he was the Director of the Department of International Organizations at the Ministry of Foreign Affairs. From 1981 to 1983, Moussa was the Deputy Permanent Representative to the United Nations in New York, then from 1983 to 1986 Ambassador to India. In 1990, he was promoted Permanent Representative of Egypt to the United Nations. He was named Minister of Foreign Affairs by Prime Minister Atef Sedki on 20 May 1991. He was minister until 15 May 2001 when he was elected as Secretary-General of the Arab League.

Moussa has been heavily involved with Egypt's foreign policy since 1958. He was Egypt's ambassador to the United Nations, India, and Switzerland for a total of 21 years. Moussa was one of the Arab and international diplomats who tried to resolve the Lebanese Civil War (1975–1990). After serving as Egypt's Foreign Minister from 1991 to 2001, he served as the Secretary General of the Arab League. Moussa has been an extremely popular political figure in Egypt due to his criticism of Israeli policies towards Gaza and the West Bank. In August 1994, Moussa made his first official visit to Israel—a visit marked by tension and controversy. Moussa drew criticism from Israeli commentators for declining to visit the Yad Vashem Holocaust Memorial, a customary stop for visiting dignitaries, and for focusing his agenda entirely on pressing Israel to join the Nuclear Non-Proliferation Treaty (NPT). At a joint press conference with Israeli Foreign Minister Shimon Peres, Moussa argued that Israel’s nuclear capability posed a threat to Egypt, while Peres responded by emphasizing Israel’s peaceful intentions and comparing the situation to the United States’ possession of nuclear weapons.

At the Forum for new diplomacy in February 2010, Moussa gave a speech in which he criticized the U.S. government's double standard supporting Israel's nuclear weapons policy but not allowing Iran to pursue nuclear energy. He also criticized Western countries, including the U.S., for not recognizing the results of the 2006 Palestinian election that brought Hamas into power. Like Mohamed El-Baradei and the Muslim Brotherhood, he supports opening the Gaza Strip/Egypt border. His criticisms have made Moussa extremely popular.

== Secretary-General of the Arab League ==
On 15 May 2001, Moussa was selected as Secretary-General of the League of Arab States and took office on 1 June 2001. Critics of former-President Hosni Mubarak allege that Moussa's appointment to the office of Secretary-General of the Arab League was motivated by Mubarak's desire to remove him from the public spotlight, and so he would not compete as a candidate in the 2005 presidential elections.

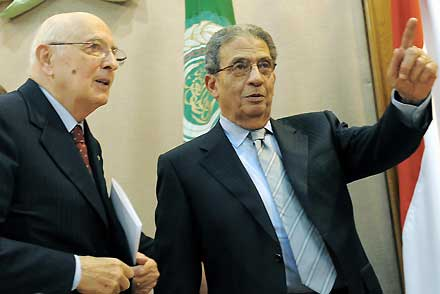
Amr Moussa with Giorgio Napolitano, President of Italy (Cairo, 27 October 2008).

On 2003, he became a member of the United Nations High Level Panel on Threats, Challenges and Change for International Peace and Security.

On 2009, he signed a memorandum of understanding with the Holy See and met with Pope Benedict XVI in order to strengthen joint projects and to promote peace and dialogue on a cultural and political level.

On 13 June 2010, Moussa visited Gaza in a move to pressure Israel to lift its economic blockade over Hamas-ruled Gaza. The visit by Moussa was the first by an official of the Arab League since the election of Hamas in 2007. Immediately after the 2010 Gaza flotilla raid, Moussa said the Arab League would go to the UN Security Council to demand the blockade be lifted. On 15 May 2011, Nabil Elaraby was elected as Secretary-General of the Arab League and succeeded Moussa on 1 July 2011.

== Possible presidential candidacies ==
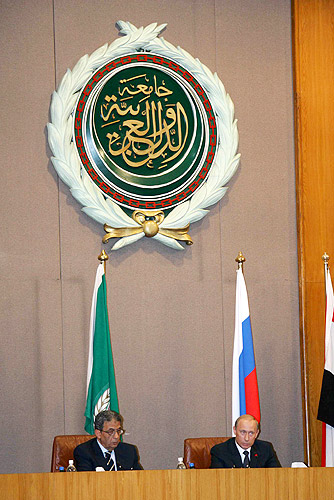
Amr Moussa with Vladimir Putin (Cairo, 27 April 2005).

=== 2005 presidential election ===
In 2004, an online community gathered tens of thousands of signatures petitioning for Moussa to run in the 2005 elections, but there was no response. In a Doha Debate Forum televised by the BBC in 2006, Moussa was asked about his presidential hopes. Moussa merely replied that he hoped to continue the recent run of successes that have occurred under his leadership at the Arab League until the end of his term.

=== 2012 presidential election ===
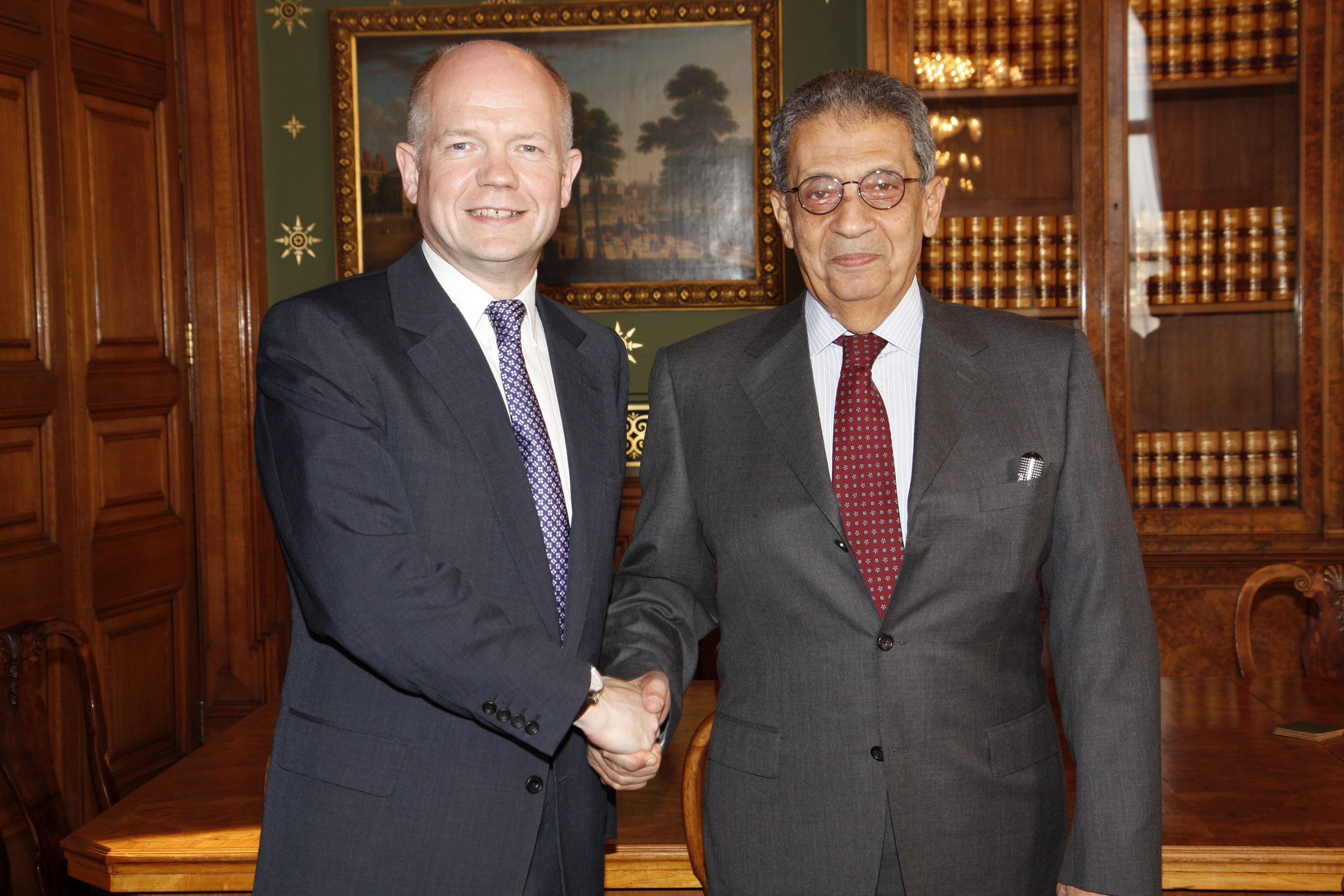
Amr Moussa with William Hague (London, 25 May 2010).

When asked in October 2009 about rumours that he might run for the presidency in 2012, Moussa did not deny his intention to run for office or rule it out, leaving the door open to speculations. He argued that "It's the right of every citizen that has the capacity and efficiency to aspire to any political office that would allow him to contribute to the service of his nation". He further stated to the press that the qualities required to be the President of Egypt also apply to Gamal Mubarak, son of Hosni Mubarak. He also expressed appreciation "for the confidence expressed by many people when they talk about his candidacy for the presidency and that the message reached him".

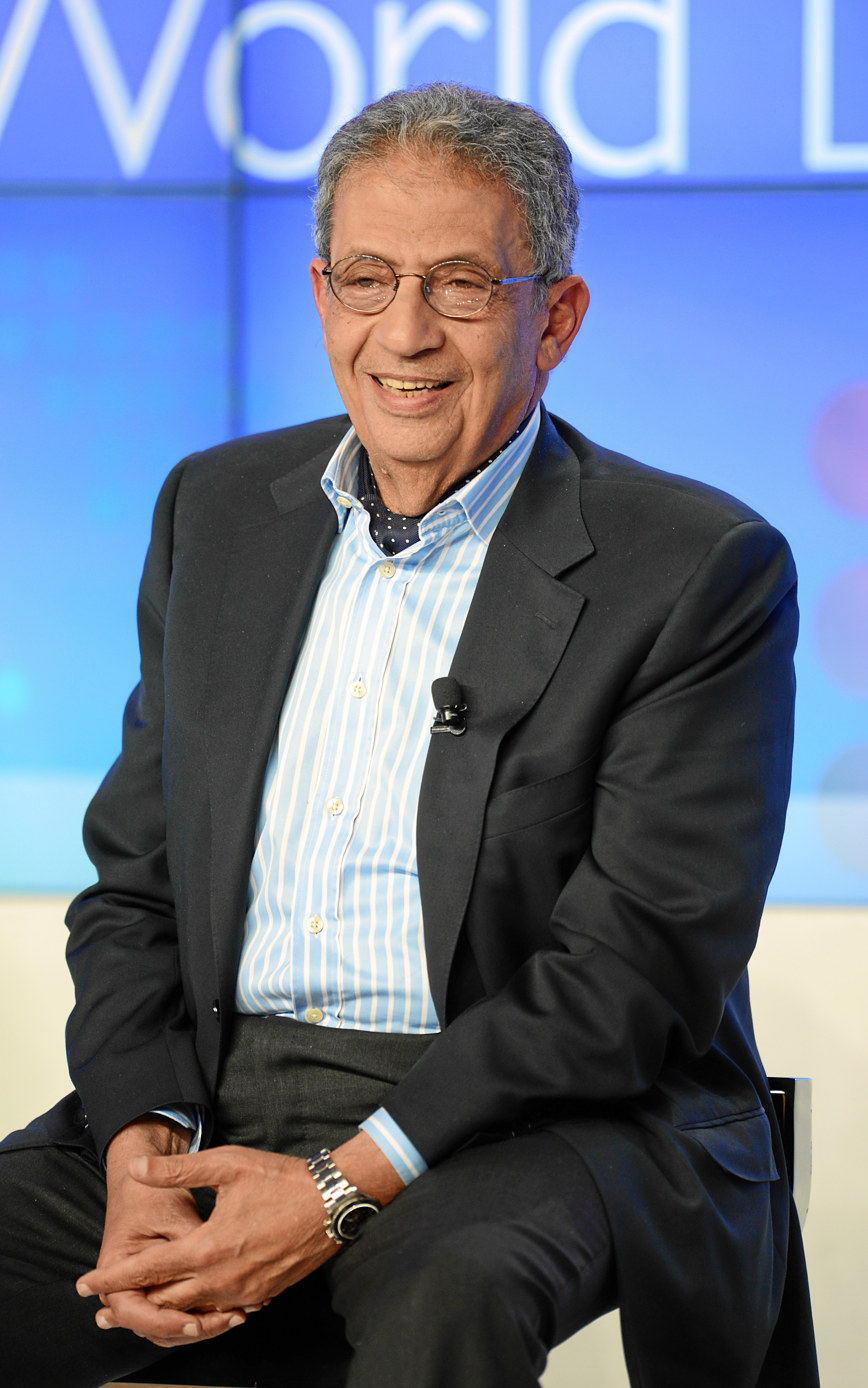
Moussa during the World Economic Forum (Davos, 2013)

Moussa held talks with Mohamed El-Baradei after his return to Egypt. Many speculate that this meeting was held to discuss Constitutional reforms that will allow transparency in the election process as well as lifting restrictions on independent candidates. On 26 January 2011, at the Annual Horasis meeting in Zürich, Moussa shared strong views on the need for economic and political reforms in Egypt, and made it clear that he was considering a run.

On 1 February 2011, following the announcement by President Hosni Mubarak that he would not stand in the upcoming presidential elections, Moussa told CNN that he would seriously think about standing himself as a candidate in the next few weeks. On the 8 February broadcast of Al Jazeera English's Empire, well-connected American journalist Seymour Hersh stated that Moussa was considered the U.S.'s favored "Plan B" should Mubarak resign, "whether he knows it or not." On 11 February 2011, Al Jazeera English Online read from a Reuters report that stated Moussa was resigning from his position with the Arab League; on the day that President Mubarak resigned the presidency this furthered rumours he might make a strong bid for president when elections are announced in Egypt. On 12 February 2011, the Egyptian daily newspaper Alwafd reported that a group of Egyptian youth met with Moussa to discuss a possible nomination for the presidential election. Moussa reportedly agreed to the nomination, but stated that he would await the currently proposed constitutional reforms.

Amr Moussa announced that he would be running as a presidential candidate on 1 March 2011.

A poll conducted during the 2011 protests asking "who do you think should be the next President of Egypt?" showed Moussa in the lead, with 26% of respondents naming him.

Moussa placed fifth in the election with 11.13% of the first round vote. After the election, he formed the Conference Party with which a number of smaller opposition parties aligned.

== Criticisms ==
Although credited with shaking up the Arab League's bureaucracy, Moussa has been criticized by former and current staff members of the Arab League for his management of the organization. In his book, The League of the Arab States: what’s left of it, former Arab League and Syrian diplomat Kawkab Najib El Rayess accused Moussa of favoritism and promoting his loyalists into the high ranks of the Arab League at the expense of the more-qualified diplomats.

== Honours ==
=== Egyptian national honours ===
Ribbon bar	Honour
	Grand Cordon of the Order of the Nile
	Grand Cordon of the Order of the Arab Republic of Egypt

=== Foreign honors ===
Ribbon bar	Country	Honour
	Argentina	Grand Cross of the Order of the Liberator General San Martín
	Brazil	Grand Cross of the Order of the Southern Cross
	Ecuador	Grand Cross of National Order of Merit
	France	Commander of the Legion of Honour
	Germany	Grand Cross of the Order of Merit of the Federal Republic of Germany
ribbon bar	Japan	Grand Cordon of the Order of the Rising Sun
	Jordan	Grand Cordon of the Supreme Order of the Renaissance
The Star of Palestine (Palestine) Ribbon	Palestine	Grand Cordon of the Order of the Star of Palestine
Orden of Friendship	Russia	Medal of the Order of Friendship
SWE Order of the Polar Star (after 1975) - Commander 1st Class BAR	Sweden	Commander 1st Class of the Order of the Polar Star
Order of the Two Niles (Sudan) - ribbon bar	Sudan	First Class of the Order of the Two Niles
	Tunisia	Grand Officer of the Order of the Republic

=== Honorary degrees ===
- ADA University
- American University of Beirut

== Publications ==
- (in Arabic) Memoirs. 1: The Formation and the years of Diplomacy (كتابية : النشأة و سنوات الدبلوماسية), ed. Dar al-Chorouq, Cairo, 2017

Diplomatic posts
Preceded by Ahmed Aboul Gheit	Egyptian Ambassador to the United Nations; 1990–1991	Succeeded by Nabil Elaraby
Preceded by Ahmed Asmat Abdel-Meguid	Secretary-General of the Arab League; 2001–2011	Succeeded by Nabil Elaraby
Political offices
Preceded by Ahmed Asmat Abdel-Meguid	Minister of Foreign Affairs; 1991–2001	Succeeded by Ahmed Maher
