= Alexander H. Joffe =

American archaeologist and historian (born 1959)

Alexander H. Joffe (born 1959) is an American archaeologist and historian of the Near East.

== Education ==
Joffe graduated from Cornell University in 1981 with a B.A in History and received a Ph.D. in Near Eastern Studies from the University of Arizona in 1991.

== Academic career ==
From 1980 to 2003, Joffe participated in and directed archaeological research in Israel, Jordan, Greece and the United States.

He participated in fieldwork at Tel Miqne, Tel Dor, Tel Yaqush, Tel el-Hammeh, Beersheva, Tel Rekhesh, Megiddo, Ain Ghazal, and elsewhere. He has written extensively on Near Eastern archaeology.

Joffe has been an associate at the Harvard Semitic Museum in Cambridge, Massachusetts, and the Albright Institute of Archaeological Research in Jerusalem, as well as the Department of Archaeology at Boston University, and has taught at Pennsylvania State University and SUNY Purchase.

From 2012 to 2022, Joffe was the editor of The Ancient Near East Today, the weekly web magazine of the American Schools of Oriental Research (ASOR).

== Advocacy ==
Joffe was made director of Middle East Forum's Campus Watch in 2004.

Joffe was formerly employed by The David Project, a pro-Israel campus group.

Joffe is an editor for Scholars for Peace in the Middle East's BDS monitor, dedicated to opposing the Boycott, Divestment and Sanctions movement on college campuses.

== Ethnic state ==
Joffe is noted for using evidence from archaeology and epigraphy to propose an "ethnic state" model to explain the rise of petty kingdoms in the southern Levant in the 10th century BC. He describes Israel, Judah, Ammon, Moab and Edom as "ethnic states": "Politics integrated by means of identity, especially ethnicity, which are territorially based... they are novel and historically contingent political systems which appear in the Levant during the first millennium BCE thanks to the confluence of several factors, not least the collapse of imperial domination and the longstanding city-state system."

== Personal life ==
Joffe married Rachel S. Hallote, the daughter of writer Cynthia Ozick, in 1992. With Hallote and J.P. Dessel he hosts the podcast This Week in the Ancient Near East.

== Books ==
- Settlement and society in the early Bronze Age I and II, southern Levant : complementarity and contradiction in a small-scale complex society, Sheffield Academic Press, 1993.
- Religion, Politics, and the Origins of Palestine Refugee Relief, Palgrave Macmillan, 2013.
- Operation Crusader and the Desert War in British History and Memory. “What is Failure? What is Loyalty?” Bloomsbury, 2020.
