= Tariq bin Saeed bin Hilail Al-Shammari =

Saudi Arabian politician (born 1977)

Member of the Consultative Assembly of Saudi Arabia
- Incumbent
- Assumed office 20 October 2020

Personal details
- Born: 17 December 1977 (age 48) Ḥaʼil, Saudi Arabia
- Education: Imam Mohammad Ibn Saud Islamic University; Naif Arab University for Security Sciences; University of East Anglia

Tariq bin Saeed bin Hilail Al-Shammari (Arabic: طارق بن سعيد بن هليل الشمري; born 17 December 1977) is a Saudi Arabian political advisor. has been a Member of the Consultative Assembly of Saudi Arabia since October 2020.

He holds a bachelor's degree from Imam Mohammad Ibn Saud Islamic University and a master's degree in law from Naif Arab University for Security Sciences. He completed a PhD in law from the University of East Anglia in 2016.
