= Henchir Guergour Neopunic inscriptions =

Series of Neopunic inscriptions at Henchir Guergour in Kef, Tunisia

Coordinates: 36.354507°N 8.517999°E

The Henchir Guergour Neopunic inscriptions are a series of ten Neopunic inscriptions discovered by René Cagnat at Henchir Guergour, also known as Masculula, near Touiref in the Kef Governorate of Tunisia. Two of the inscriptions are known as KAI 143–144, and three are kept at the Louvre.

They were first published in 1916 by Jean-Baptiste Chabot.

== Discovery ==
In March 1881, French archaeologist René Cagnat visited the still unexplored ruins of a place known locally as Henchir Guergour. It is situated 3 kilometers north of Henchir Touiref, on the road from El Kef to Chemtou. Cagnat discovered about forty Latin inscriptions, among them a dedication which stated the ancient name of the place (Divo Augusto Sacrum. Conventus civium Romanorum et Numidarum qui capita Mascululae, published in the Corpus Inscriptionum Latinarum, VIII, 15775), as well as six neo-Punic inscriptions, three of which were badly damaged. Cagnat sent photographs and stampings to Ernst Renan, who had just published the first volume of Corpus Inscriptionum Semiticarum. In a second exploration in 1882, Cagoat discovered four more neo-Punic inscriptions, including one bilingual.

== The inscriptions ==
- Chabot 1 = AO 5296
- Chabot 2 = KAI 143 = AO 5297
- Chabot 3
- Chabot 4 = KAI 144
- Chabot 5 = AO 5105
- Chabot 6 (bilingual)
- Chabot 7
- Chabot 8
- Chabot 9
- Chabot 10, also J.-G. Février, Glanes Néopuniques, JA cclv, pp. 61–64. and G. Garbini, Dieci anni di epigrafia punica nel Magreb (1965-1974), StudMagr vi, p. 27

== Gallery ==
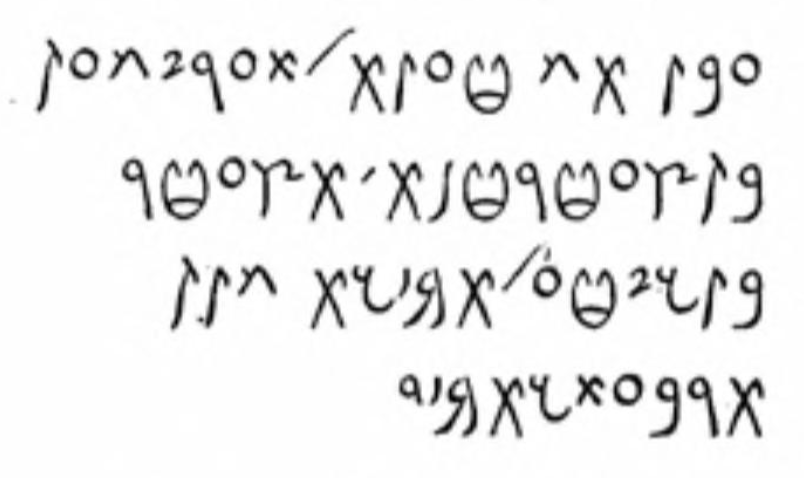

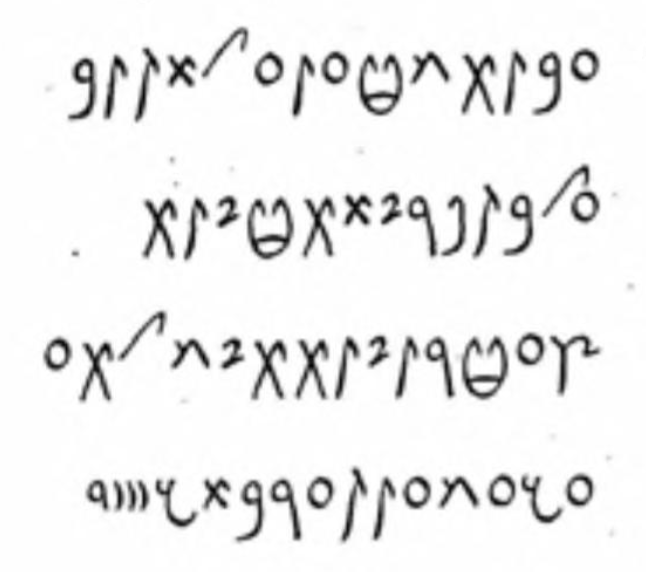

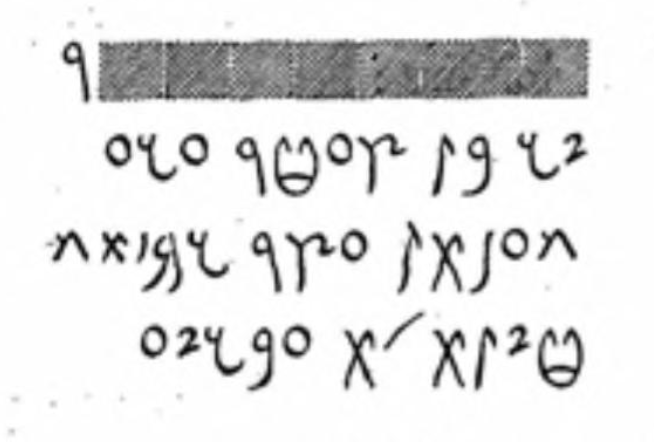

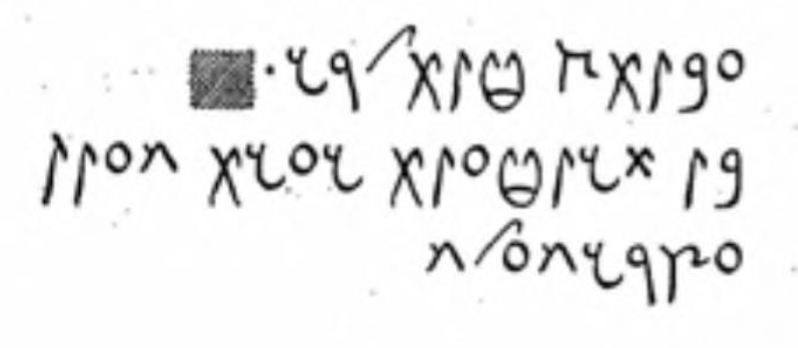

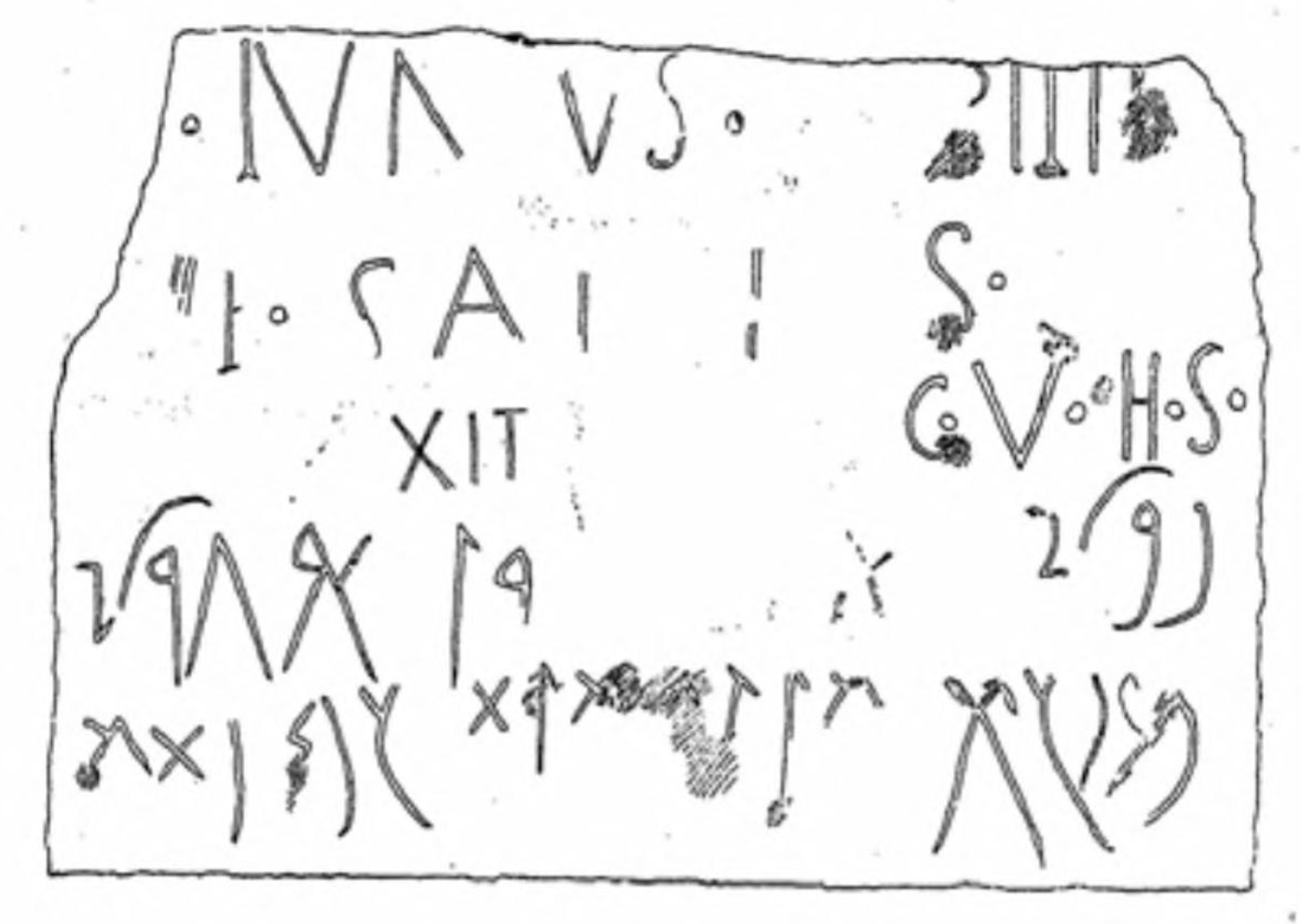

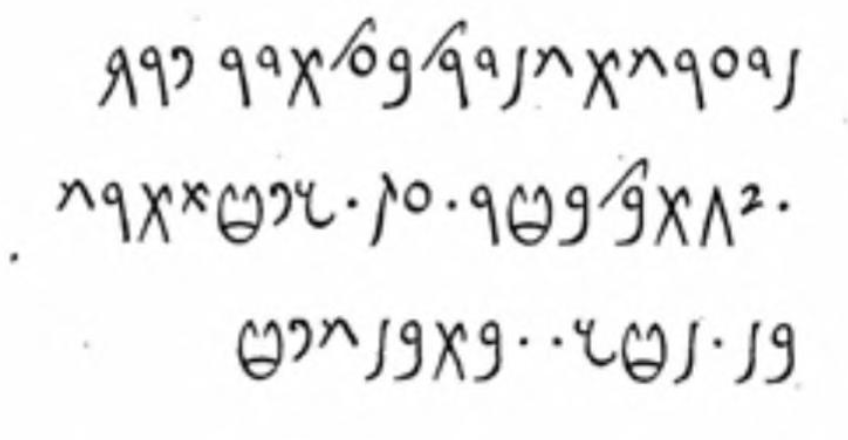
