= Battles of the French evacuation from Tunisia =

Conflict between the Algerians and the Colonial French

- Part of the Decolonization of Africa and the Bizerte crisis
Date	July–August 1961
Location	Tunisia (Bizerte, Remada, and Marker 233)
Result	French withdrawal completed in 1963

Belligerents
Tunisia	France

Commanders and leaders
Habib Bourguiba	General Maurice Challe

Strength
≈ 20,000 troops and National Guard	≈ 10,000 troops (Army, Air Force, and Navy)

Casualties and losses
600–700 killed (approx.)	24 killed

The Battles of the French evacuation from Tunisia were a series of armed confrontations between the Tunisian Armed Forces and the French Armed Forces in July and August 1961, during the final phase of France's military presence in Tunisia. These clashes included the well-known Bizerte crisis, the Battle of Remada, and the Battle of marker 233. They marked the last violent episode between the two countries before France's complete withdrawal from Tunisian territory in October 1963.

== Background ==
After Tunisia gained independence from France in 1956, French troops retained control over several military installations, most notably the Bizerte naval base and garrisons in the south such as Remada. President Habib Bourguiba pressed for total evacuation, viewing continued French presence as a violation of sovereignty. France, however, argued that the Bizerte base remained essential to its ongoing operations in the Algerian War (1954–1962).

Diplomatic negotiations stalled in early 1961. Tensions rose when Tunisian forces surrounded the Bizerte base in mid-July 1961, prompting a French military response.

== The Bizerte Crisis ==
On 19 July 1961, Tunisian troops and civilians surrounded French positions at Bizerte to demand evacuation. The French government, led by Charles de Gaulle, ordered paratroopers and marines to secure access to the naval base. Heavy fighting broke out between the two sides. French aircraft and artillery bombarded Tunisian positions, while Tunisian units attempted to seize control of key roads and installations.

By 22 July, France had regained control of the city. Estimates of Tunisian casualties vary from 600 to more than 1,000 killed, while France reported 24 dead and 100 wounded. International reaction was swift: the United Nations Security Council debated the crisis and called for an immediate ceasefire and negotiations.

== The Battle of Remada ==
In southern Tunisia, the French maintained a major air base at Remada, near the Algerian border. Following the Bizerte clashes, Tunisian forces attempted to isolate the French garrison. Skirmishes occurred in late July 1961 between elements of the Tunisian National Guard and French troops.

Although less intense than the fighting at Bizerte, the Remada incidents illustrated the broader contest for sovereignty. Eventually, both sides reached a local ceasefire, but Tunisia renewed its demand for complete French evacuation.

== The Battle of Marker 233 ==
A final confrontation took place at a small desert outpost known as Marker 233, located near Bordj el-Khadra, at the junction of the Tunisian, Algerian, and Libyan borders. In early August 1961, a Tunisian patrol clashed with a French unit, resulting in several casualties. Although militarily minor, this event became a symbol of the last armed encounter between France and Tunisia.

== Aftermath ==
Following international mediation — particularly by Morocco and Egypt — the ceasefire was formalized in late July 1961. Negotiations continued over the following months, and France agreed to evacuate all remaining bases. The final French withdrawal from Bizerte occurred on 15 October 1963.

The clashes of 1961 strengthened Bourguiba's domestic standing and became a central moment in Tunisia's postcolonial history. They are commemorated annually as a national day of remembrance.

== Legacy ==
The battles associated with the French evacuation of Tunisia are regarded as the closing chapter of the country's struggle for complete independence.They also reflected the broader dynamics of decolonization in North Africa, as similar crises unfolded in Morocco and Algeria. French–Tunisian relations normalized during the mid-1960s, with cooperation agreements replacing the previous colonial ties.

== See also ==
- Bizerte crisis
- Bombing of Sakiet Sidi Youssef
- History of Tunisia
- French Tunisia
- Algerian War
- Habib Bourguiba

== Bibliography ==
- Perkins, Kenneth (2014). A History of Modern Tunisia (2nd ed.). Cambridge University Press. pp. 115–119. ISBN 978-1107654730.
- Buron, Robert (1962). Les Derniers jours de Bizerte. Paris: Plon.
- Hibbs, Douglas A. (November 1961). "Tunisia's Bizerte Crisis". Current History. 41 (243): 289–293.
- Brett, Michael (1997). The Arab World in the Twentieth Century. Longman. pp. 203–204. ISBN 978-3882266344.
- Abadi, Jacob (2018). Tunisia Since the Revolution: Between Reform and Continuity. Routledge.
- Anderson, Raymond H. (16 October 1963). "French Quit Bizerte; Tunisian Flag Raised". The New York Times.
- "La crise de Bizerte". Le Monde (in French). 24 July 1961.
- "Fighting in Bizerte". The Times (London). 21 July 1961.
- "La bataille de la borne 233". Jeune Afrique (in French). No. 29. 1962. pp. 10–12.
- "Les combats de Remada". La Presse de Tunisie (in French). 27 July 1961.
- "United Nations Security Council Resolution 164 (1961): The Situation in Bizerte". United Nations Official Document System. United Nations. 22 July 1961.
- United Nations Yearbook, 1961. United Nations. 1962.
- Moore, Clement Henry (1965). Tunisia Since Independence: The Dynamics of One-Party Government. University of California Press. ISBN 978-0313234088.
- Alexander, Martin S.; Keiger, John F. V. (2002). France and the Algerian War, 1954–1962: Strategy, Operations and Diplomacy. Routledge. ISBN 978-0714682648.
- Ganiage, Jean (1982). L'expansion coloniale de la France sous la Troisième République (in French). Payot.
- Livre blanc sur la crise de Bizerte (in French). Ministère tunisien de la Défense nationale. 1962.
