= Mount Sudan (Tunisia) =

Mountain in Tunisia

Jebel Sudan Mountain is part of the Wurga mountain range, located northwest of the Republic of Tunisia in the Kef Governorate. The Mountain is located at Coordinates 36°16'N 8°23'E, north of the town of Sakiet Sidi Youssef. It is only 1,500 meters away from the border with Algeria. The height of the summit is 980m.
