= Orders, decorations, and medals of Tunisia =

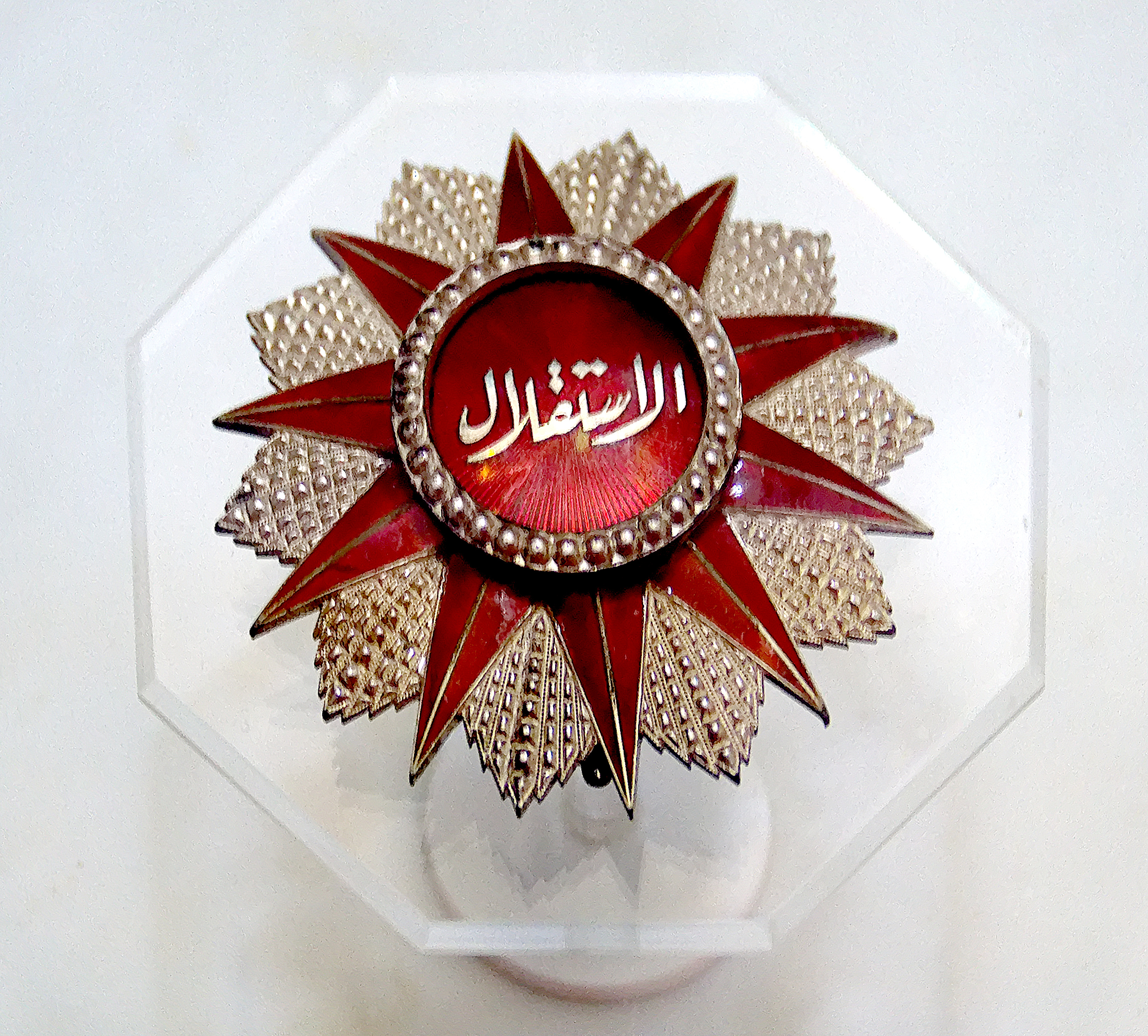
The Order of Independence.

The orders, decorations, and medals of Tunisia comprise a system by which Tunisian citizens and military personnel are rewarded for their courage, achievement, or service to the country. It primarily consists of honorary orders.

== National Orders ==
The national orders consist of the high national orders and the national order of merit. They are divided into five classes:

- Grand Cordon
- Grand Officer
- Commander
- Officer
- Knight

=== High national orders ===
The national high orders are as follows:

- Order of Independence (1956)
- Order of the Republic (1959)
- Order of Loyalty and Sacrifice (2017)

=== National Order of Merit ===
The National Order of Merit is awarded to reward those who have distinguished themselves in the performance of a public service or the exercise of a private activity and who have contributed through their competence and dedication to the development of the country and the consolidation of its institutions. The sectors and fields of activity covered by the Order of Merit are as follows:

- Order of Sporting Merit
- Order of Cultural Merit
- Order of Agricultural Merit
- Order of Craft Merit
- Order of Maritime Merit
- Order of Merit for Teaching
- Order of Merit for Youth
- Order of Academic Merit

== Medal of Labor ==
The Medal of Labour comprises five levels:

- Gold medal, which is awarded unconditionally for outstanding service.
- Major level (Gold Medal), which is awarded after 30 years of effective service.
- 1st Level (Vermeil Medal), which is awarded after 25 years of effective service.
- 2nd Level (Silver Medal), which is awarded after 20 years of effective service.
- 3rd Level (Bronze Medal), which is awarded after 15 years of effective service.

== Special medals ==
- Military Medal
- Medal of Honour for Internal Security Forces
- Customs Medal of Honour

== Abolished orders ==
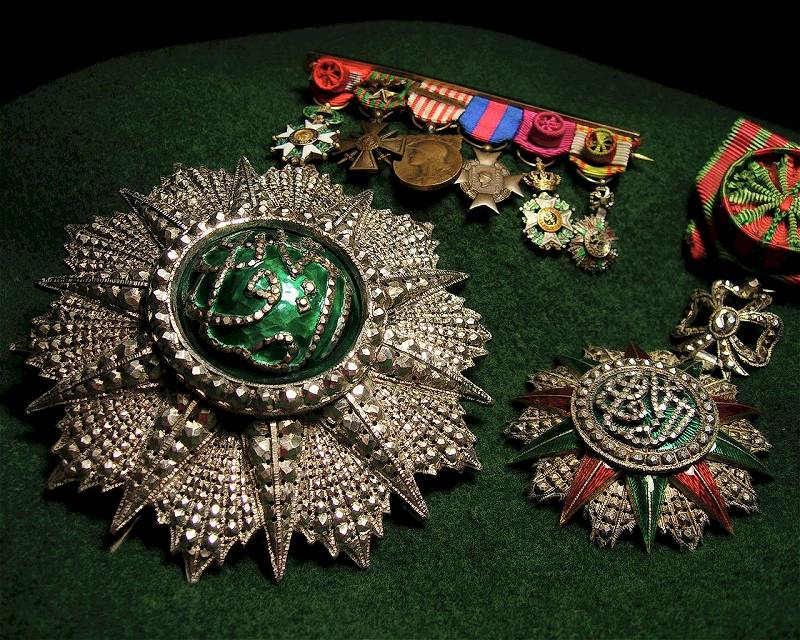
Various insignia of the Nichan Iftikhar, one of the Beylical orders.

=== Beylical Orders ===
- Order of the Blood (1840-1957)
- Order of Glory (1837-1957)
- Nichan Ahed el-Aman el-Mourassa (1874-1957)
- Order of the Fundamental Alliance (1860-1957)
- Order of Abdu'l-Kedir (1911)
- Order of Nazir (1912)
- Order of the Crown of Tunisia (1956)

Prime Minister Habib Bourguiba ended the monarchy after independence from France was achieved on 20 March 1956. The Bey of Tunis was deposed on 25 July 1957 and the Tunisian Republic was proclaimed. In 1959, Law No. 32 reorganized the Order of Independence, abolished the Beylical Orders and prohibited the wearing of certain Beylical decorations by their Tunisian holders.

=== Other Republican orders, decorations and medals ===
- Order of 7 November (1988-2011)
- Commemorative Medal of the Battle of the Evacuation of Bizerte (1963)
