= Battle of Remada =

- Part of Battle of the borders (Algerian War)
Date	May 19, 1958
Location	Remada
Result	See aftermath

Belligerents
Tunisia	France

Commanders and leaders
Unknown	Unknown

Strength
several thousand soldiers	Unknown

Casualties and losses
Unknown	Unknown

The battle of Remada took place in May 1958, three months after the bombing of Sakiet Sidi Youssef. The battle opposed Tunisian forces to the French forces at Remada.

== Background ==
On 18 May 1958, French forces did not respect the status quo ante bellum. A formation of 30 armored vehicles crossed the demarcation line in southern Tunisia and occupied the village of Bir Amir, which provoked the Battle of Remada.

== The battle ==
On 19 May 1958, Tunisian forces, having received reinforcements from Tataouine, succeeded in dislodging French troops from the Bir Amir base, located 40 kilometers north of Remada. This allowed the Tunisian forces to surround the entire area around Remada by positioning their troops at Hachim, Kambout, and Ouled al-Ghar, effectively blocking the advance of French reinforcements coming from Dehiba and Bordj el-Bourgh.

On the evening of 24 May, a first French offensive aimed at forcing the Kambut line failed, and one armored vehicle was destroyed. A second offensive by French forces also failed, resulting in heavy losses. After French reinforcements from Dehiba were halted by Tunisian units, French aircraft bombarded Tunisian positions throughout 25 May. This led to a tactical withdrawal of Tunisian forces into the surrounding mountains. Nevertheless, Tunisian forces continued to harass the French until clashes ceased on 28 May.

== Aftermath ==
On 29 May 1958, Tunisia filed a complaint with the UN. Following a UN intervention, French forces evacuated southern Tunisia. This battle also led to the initiation of the Franco-Tunisian Agreements of 17 June 1958, which addressed the complete French evacuation from Tunisian territory.
