= Battle of marker 233 =

Battle of Marker 233
Date	July 20, 1961
Location	Garet Al Hamel
Result	Tunisian victory: Recapture of marker 233

Belligerents
Tunisia	French colonial empire

Commanders and leaders
Abdallah el Abbab	Unknown

Strength
Unknown	Unknown

Casualties and losses
19 soldiers killed	60 soldiers killed 1 plane shot down 6 vehicles destroyed

The Battle of marker 233 took place on 20 July 1961, between Tunisian and French forces in the vicinity of Garet al Hamel.

== Background ==
Following the agreements of 17 June 1956, the French had granted the Tunisians the right to retake Fort Saint and the surrounding wells. However, this cut off the French troops from their water supply, which led to a deterioration in relations between France and Tunisia. These tensions escalated further in July 1961 during the Bizerte crisis. As a result, French forces advanced to the gates of Garet al Hamel with the aim of retaking marker 233.

== Battle ==
Tunisian forces, commanded by Abdallah el Abbab, successfully defended marker 233. During the fighting, they reportedly killed more than 60 French soldiers, shot down a plane, and destroyed six vehicles.

== Aftermath ==
Three days later, a ceasefire was issued by the Security Council, and Tunisian forces were called upon to withdraw from marker 233. However, French forces took advantage of the ceasefire to re-establish their presence in the surrounding area.
