= Museum of Popular Arts and Traditions of Le Kef =

Coordinates: 36.182800°N 8.715300°E

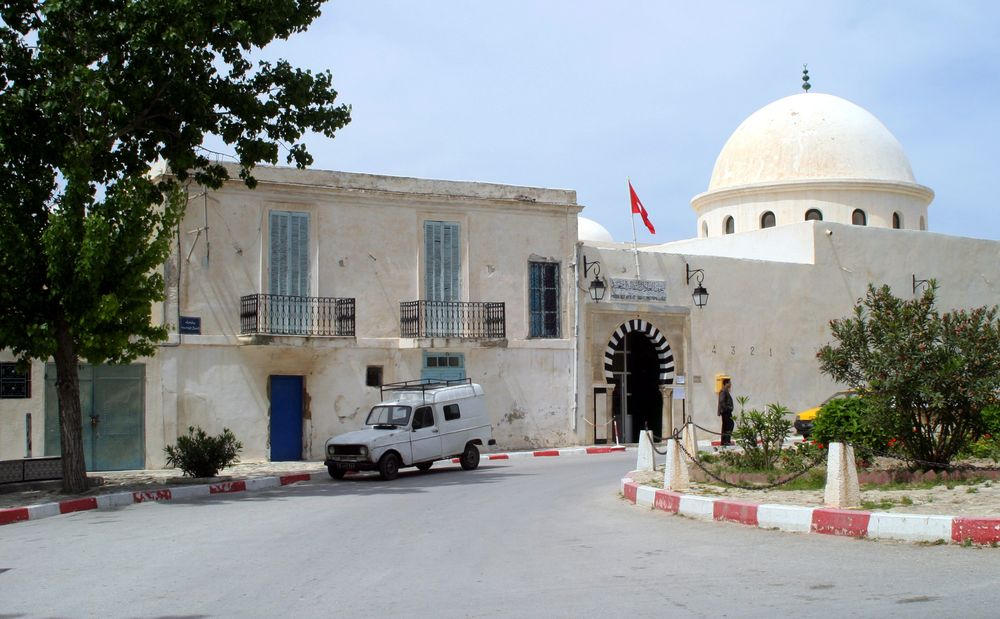
- Established: 1970
- Location: El Kef, Tunisia
- Type: History Museum

The Museum of popular arts and traditions of Le Kef (Arabic: متحف الفنون والتقاليد الشعبية بالكاف; French: Musée des Arts et Traditions populaires du Kef) is a Tunisian ethnographic museum located in the city of El Kef. The museum is dedicated to displaying various artifacts and historical objects that were used by various tribes that inhabited Tunisia. The museum is housed in an 18th-century Sufi complex.

== History ==
The museum is located in the old zawiya of Sidi Ben Aïssa. The building where the museum is located was built in 1784, this building served as the headquarters of the brotherhood of Rahmania. This building is a social and religious complex. The museum was inaugurated in 1970 and contains collections of handicrafts and ethnographic objects.

In 2015, 533 people were reported to have visited the museum in that year. In 2017, following the renovation of parts of the Ghriba Synagogue in the city of Kef, real estate and objects such as books and manuscripts were temporarily moved from the synagogue to the museum. In 2019, René Trabelsi, Tunisia's Minister of Tourism and Handicrafts, visited the museum and spoke about the organization of cultural events in the city.

== Collections ==
The museum has collections of various ethnographic and anthropological objects: and artifacts such as utensils, ceramics, traditional clothing and handicrafts. The museum contains exhibits about the life of the nomads and the characteristics of Tunisian cities. Part of the museum complex includes a traditional house, whose rooms have been transformed to display exhibits about Tunisian industry. The museum also contains Islamic sundials. The museum's nomadic exhibits include teapots, rugs, large tents and chests. The museum is divided into 4 rooms

- Room 1: This room contains displays of ceremonial costumes and jewelry.
- Room 2: This room contains historical artifacts used by nomadic tribes in activities such as agriculture.
- Room 3: This room contains bee smokers.
- Room 4: This room contains various artifacts such as clothing and ancient weapons.

== Gallery ==
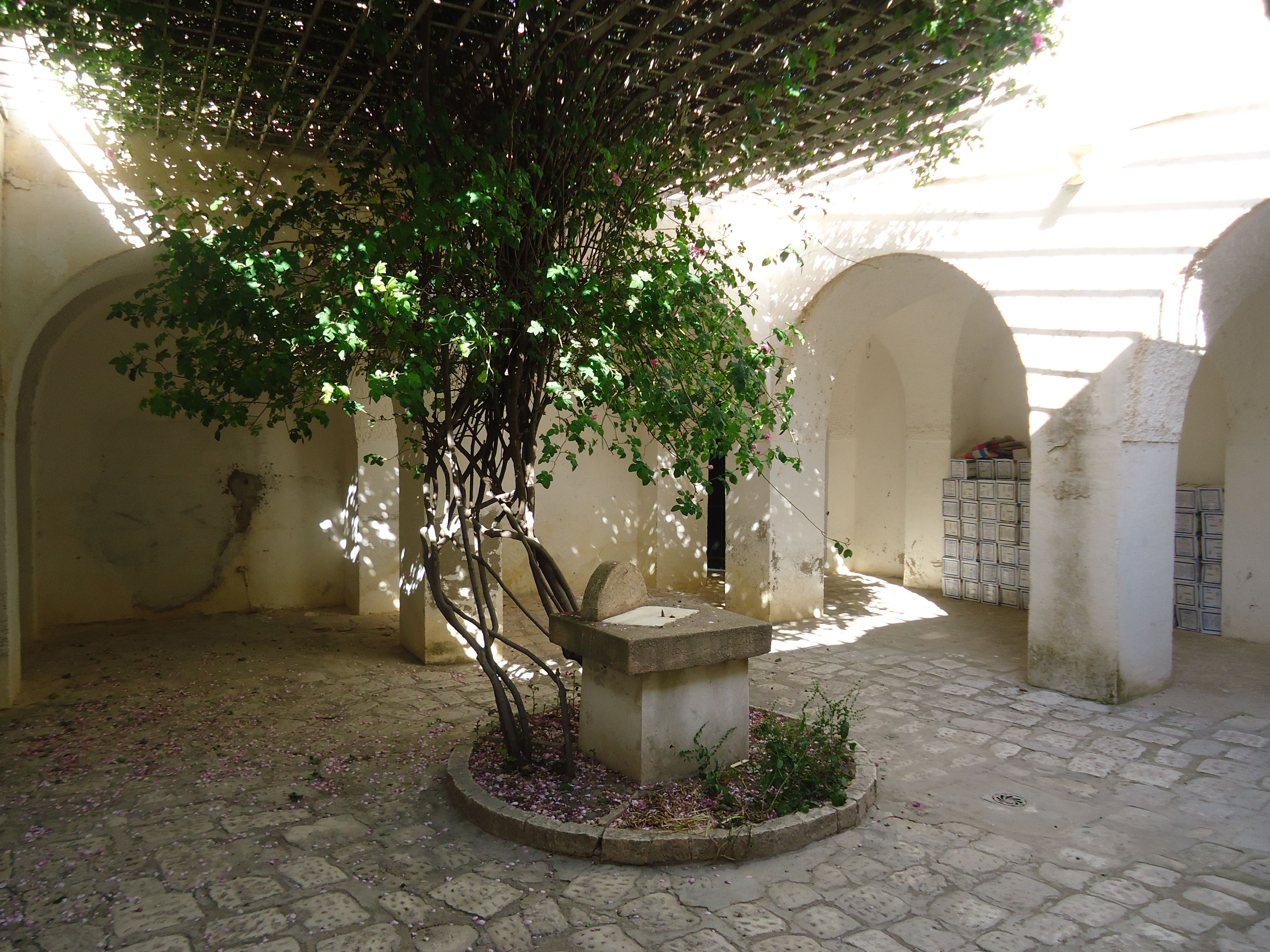
Islamic sundial in the museum courtyard

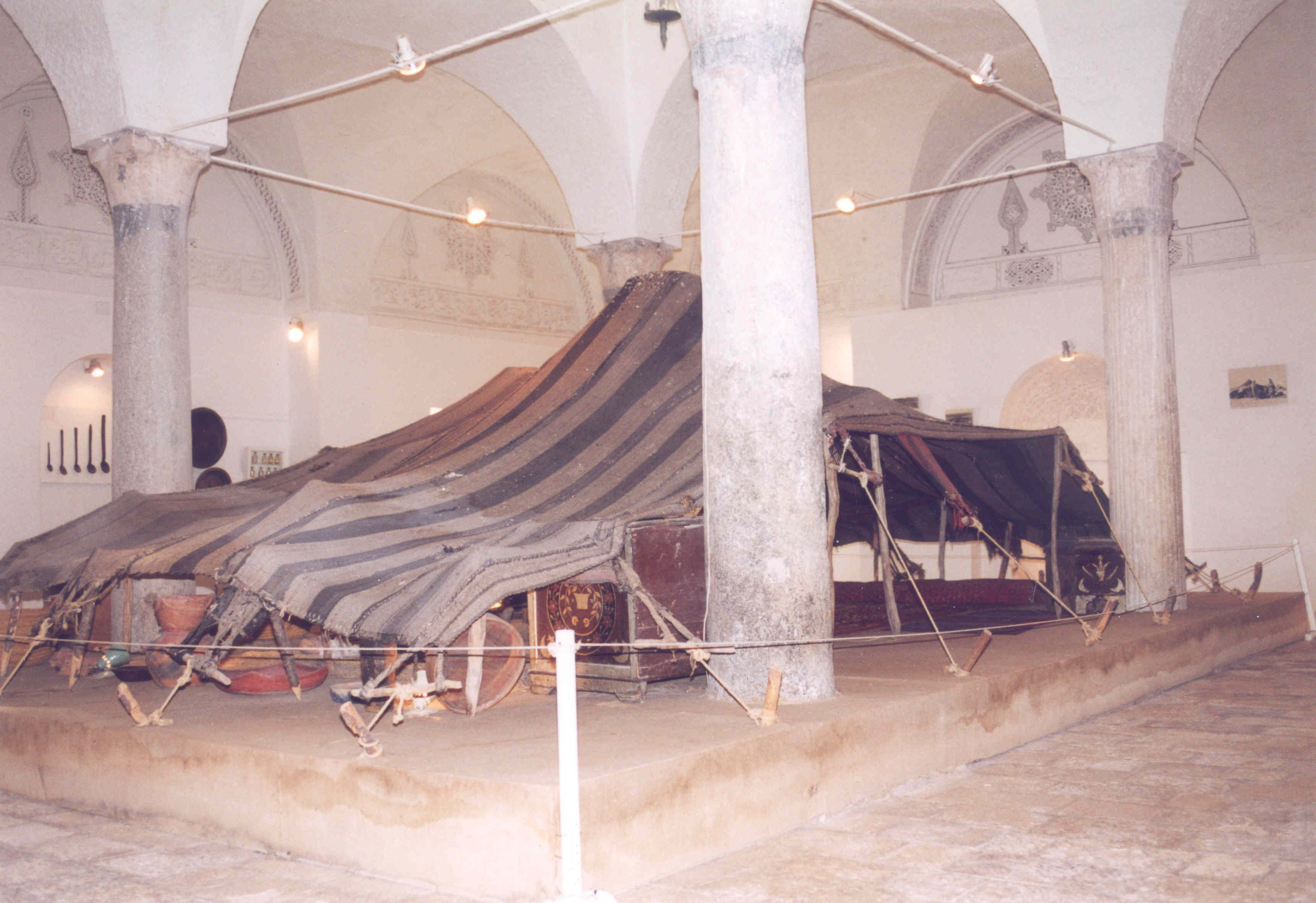
Nomadic tent on display in the second room.

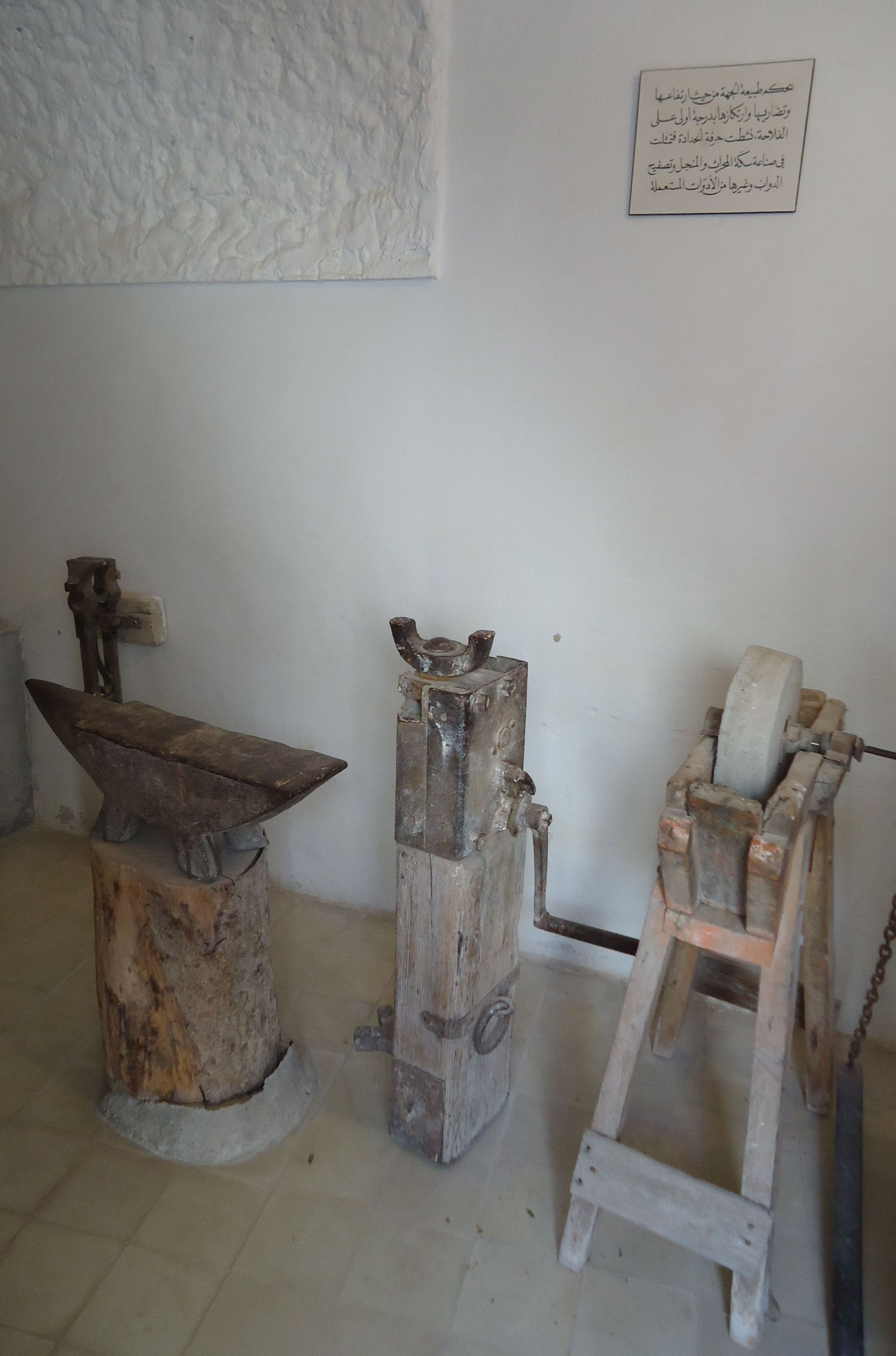
Blacksmith's instruments

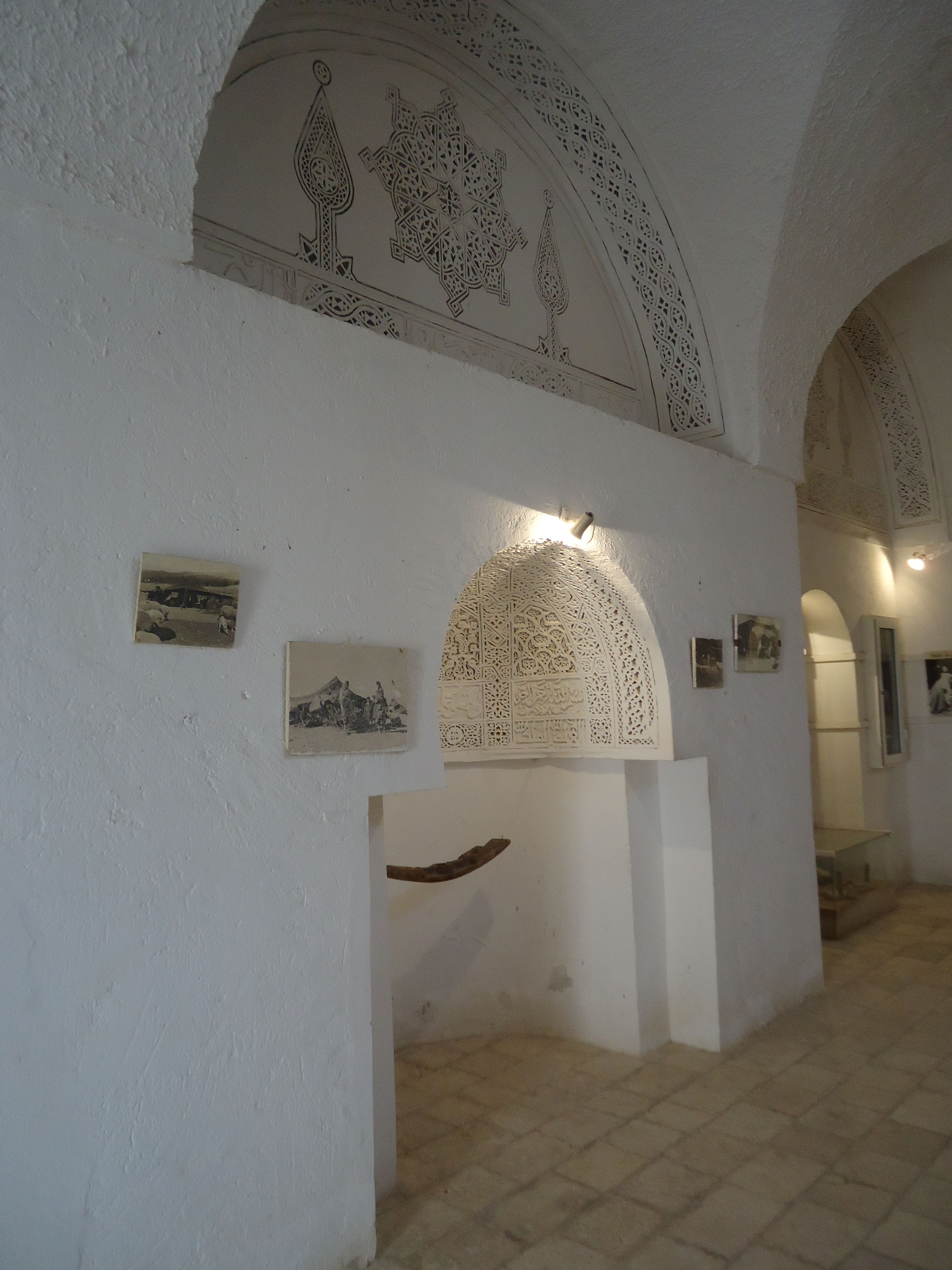
Mihrab of the second room
