= Kasbah of Le Kef =

Fort in El Kef, Tunisia

Coordinates: 36.181957°N 8.712694°E

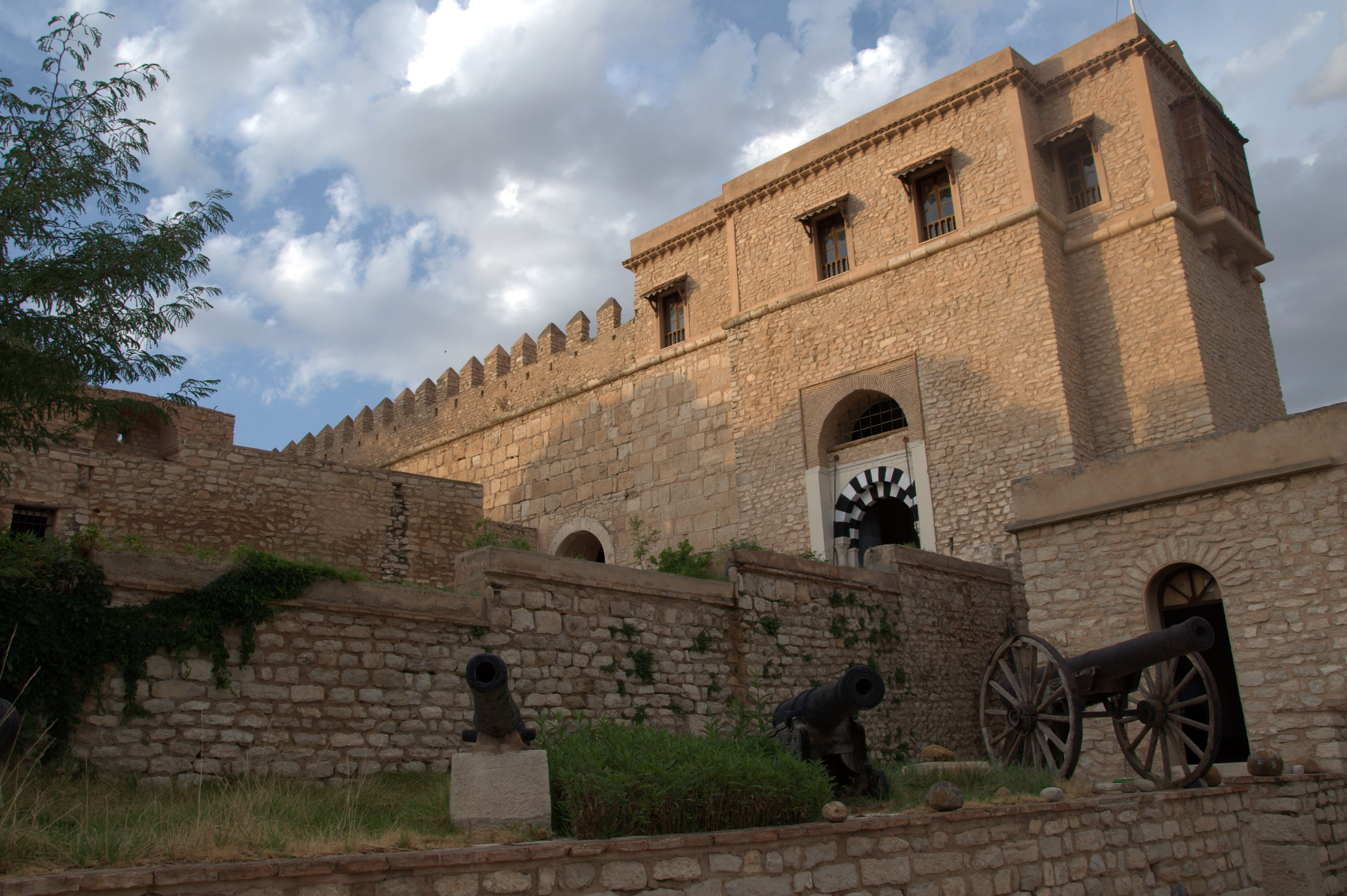
Kasbah of Le Kef

Kasbah of Le Kef (Arabic: قصبة الكاف) is a kasbah fortification in the city of El Kef, Tunisia. The kasbah was constructed in 1600 during the Ottoman rule of the local tribes and borders, as one of the many forts established for the monitoring of the local area. It played a major role in the defense of the city as well as administration which was conducted from the fort.

== Description ==
As the city of El Kef existed long since the Roman-era, the site was used for defense of the city by several civilizations in the past, including the Romans and Arabs, according to the texts, inscriptions and ruins existed in the fort. It was established as kasbah for the first time by the Ottomans in 1600, consisted of four watchtowers, a room for the soldiers, and a secret door for escape accessible to the northwest side of the fort.

The fort was renovated several times, first during the era of the ruler Hammuda Pasha in the mid-17th century, which added a moat leading to the bottom area of the medina quarter, and watchtowers, walls, and other fortifications. These structures were repaired in 1806 by the hand of the Dutch engineer known as Humbolt, also adding new towers on the northern side. The kasbah also contains a space surrounded by rooms, a mosque, ammo, and basin for collecting rainwater. Today, the building is a tourist spot as well as often used as a venue for festivals.
