= Kalâat Khasba =

Coordinates: 35°40′N 8°35′E

- Town
- Interactive map of Kalâat Khasba
- Country: Tunisia
- Governorate: Kef Governorate

Population (2014)
  - Total: 2,558
- Time zone: UTC+1 (CET)

Kalâat Khasba (Arabic: القلعة الخصباء) is a town in the Kef Governorate, Tunisia. As of 2014 it had a population of 2,558, compared to 2,871 in 2004. Kalâat Khasba is the chief town of Kalâat Khasba Delegation, which had a population of 7,353 people in 2004.

== See also ==
- List of cities in Tunisia
