= Touiref =

Coordinates: 36.339293°N 8.581352°E

Touiref طويرف
- Commune and town
- Interactive map of Touiref
- Country: Tunisia
- Governorate: Kef Governorate
- Time zone: UTC+1 (CET)

Touiref is a town and commune in the Kef Governorate, Tunisia. As of 2004 it had a population of 2,895.

== See also ==
- List of cities in Tunisia
