= Tajerouine =

Coordinates: 35°53′N 8°33′E

Tajerouine تاجروين
- Commune and town
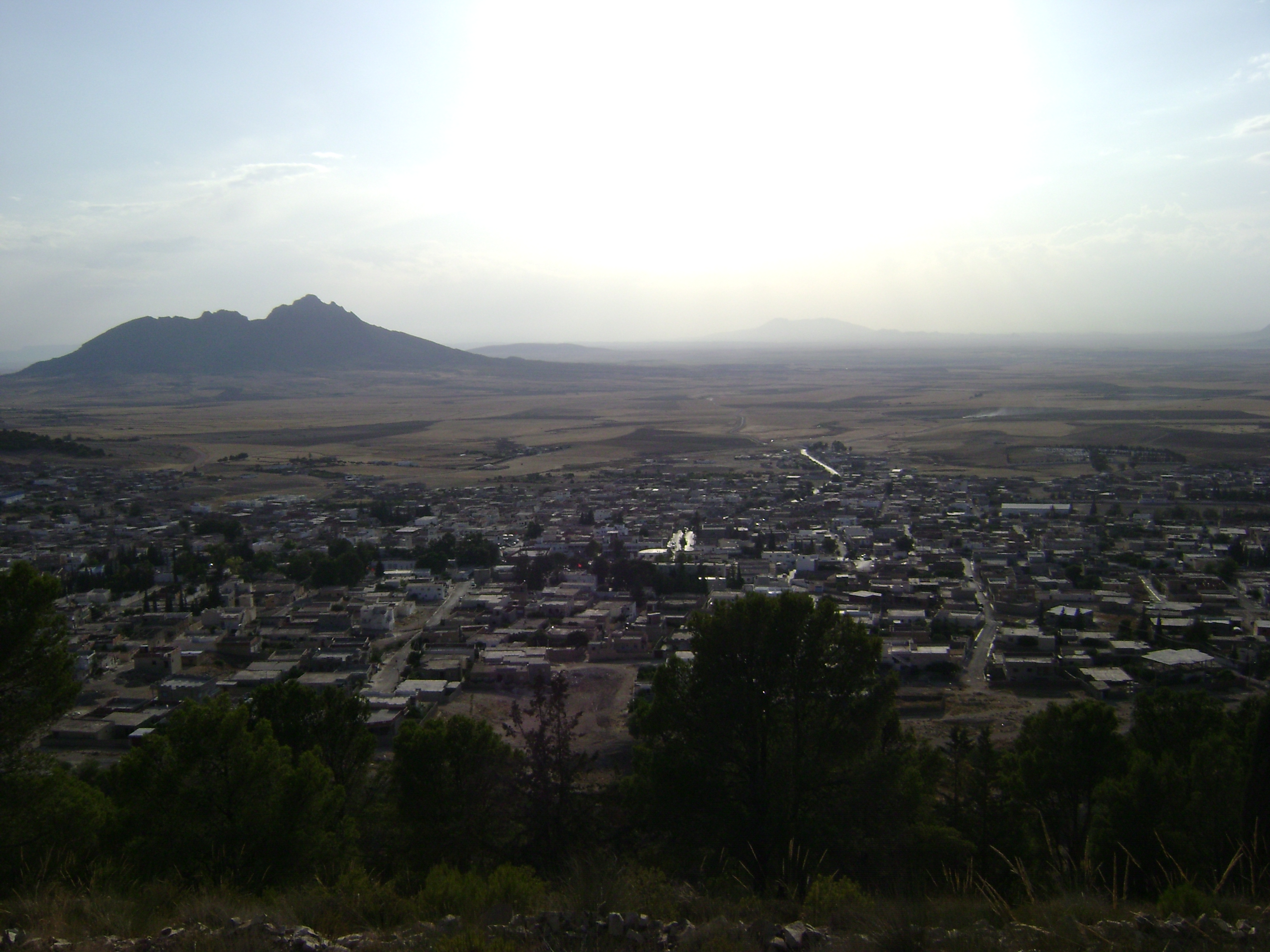
- Interactive map of Tajerouine
- Country: Tunisia
- Governorate: Kef Governorate

Population (2014)
  - Total: 19,362
- Time zone: UTC+1 (CET)

Tajerouine is a town and commune in the Kef Governorate, Tunisia. As of 2014 it had a population of 19,362.

== Population ==
2014 Census (Municipal)
Homes	Families	Males	Females	Total
6098	5204	9551	9803	19354

== See also ==
- List of cities in Tunisia
