= Bombing of Sakiet Sidi Youssef =

1958 French airstrike in Tunisia

- Part of the battle of the borders during the Algerian War
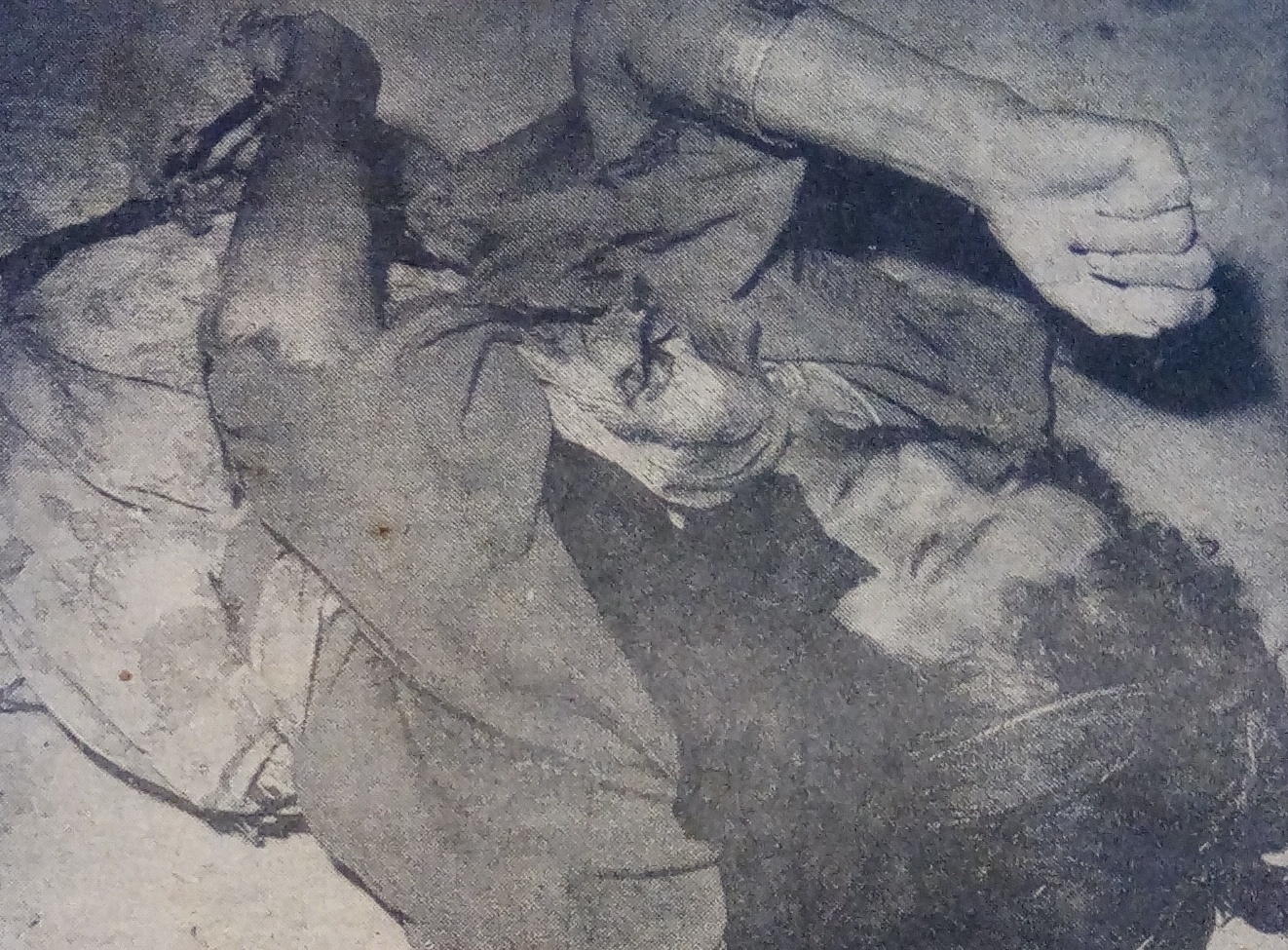
- Victim of the bombing
- Location: Sakiet Sidi Youssef, Tunisia
- Date: 8 February 1958
- Attack type: Airstrike on civilian settlement
- Weapons: 11 Douglas A-26 Invader; 6 Vought F4U Corsair; 8 De Havilland Vampire
- Deaths: Over 70
- Injuries: 148
- Victim: Tunisian civilians
- Perpetrator: France
- Motive: FLN raids across the borders

The bombing of Sakiet Sidi Youssef was a significant event of the Algerian Independence War when the French Army conducted an air raid on the Tunisian village of Sakiet Sidi Youssef targeting FLN militants and resulting in 218 civilian casualties, among which 70 dead, including 12 schoolchildren, as part of a series of military operations known as the Battle of the borders. The event sparked an international outcry. The bombing came seemingly as a response to a cross-border raid on 11 January 1958, by the Algerian ALN against a French Army border patrol company, causing the death of 14 French soldiers, two injured, and four captured. According to the French military, the ALN assailants had come from the village of Sakiet Sidi Youssef. The event had since been jointly commemorated by Algeria and Tunisia each 8th of February.

== See also ==
- Bizerte crisis
