= Paul Vanuxem =

French soldier and journalist (1904–1979)

- Born: July 22, 1904; France, Bully-les-Mines (Pas-de-Calais)
- Died: January 7, 1979 (aged 74); France, 5th arrondissement of Paris
- Military career
- Rank: Major general
- Conflicts: First Indochina War: Battle of Dien Bien Phu Vietnam War Algerian War World War 2; Battle of Monte Cassino
- Awards: Legion of Honour

Paul Fidèle Félicien Vanuxem , born on July 22, 1904, in Bully-les-Mines (Pas-de-Calais) and died on January 7, 1979 (aged 74) in the 5th arrondissement of Paris, was a French major general and journalist .

Having served during World War II and the First Indochina War, he is later known for his involvement in French Algeria. and South Vietnam

He was a Grand Officer of the Legion of Honour.

== Life ==
During World War II, Vanuxem fought in the Battle of Monte Cassino.

At the end of World War II, Vanuxem held the rank of major. He was almost continuously stationed in the Indochina War . After the defeat at the Battle of Dian Bien Phu, Vanuxem commanded the evacuation of French troops from North Vietnam. He was subsequently promoted to brigadier general and, in 1958, to general of division. Due to his support of the OAS, he was dismissed from the army in 1961 and imprisoned soon after. He was released in 1963, and the charges against him were dropped.

He was a friend and adviser to president Nguyễn Văn Thiệu, and would visit Vietnam every year to see him and the progress of the war.
