= El Kef =

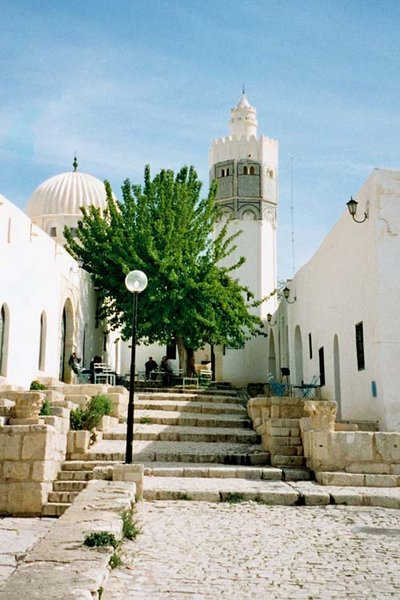
- Sidi Bou Makhlouf Mosque in el-Kef

- Location in Tunisia
- Coordinates: 36°10′56″N 8°42′53″E
- Country: Tunisia
- Governorate: Kef Governorate
- Delegation(s): Kef East, Kef West

Government
  - Mayor: Amor Idoudi (Independent)
- Elevation: 2,560 ft (780 m)

Population (2014)
  - Total: 54,701
- Time zone: UTC1 (CET)
- Postal code: 7100
- Website: www.commune-elkef.gov.tn

El Kef (Arabic: الكاف il-kāf), is a city in northwestern Tunisia. It serves as the capital of the Kef Governorate.

El Kef is situated 175 kilometres (109 mi) to the west of Tunis and some 40 kilometres (25 mi) east of the border between Algeria and Tunisia. It has a population of 45,191 (2004 census). The old town is built on the cliff face of the table-top Jebel Dyr mountain. El Kef was the provisional capital of Tunisia during World War II. It was the command centre of the Front de Libération Nationale during the Algerian War of Independence against the French in the 1950s.

The Sidi Bou Makhlouf Mausoleum entombs the patron saint of the city.

== Geography ==
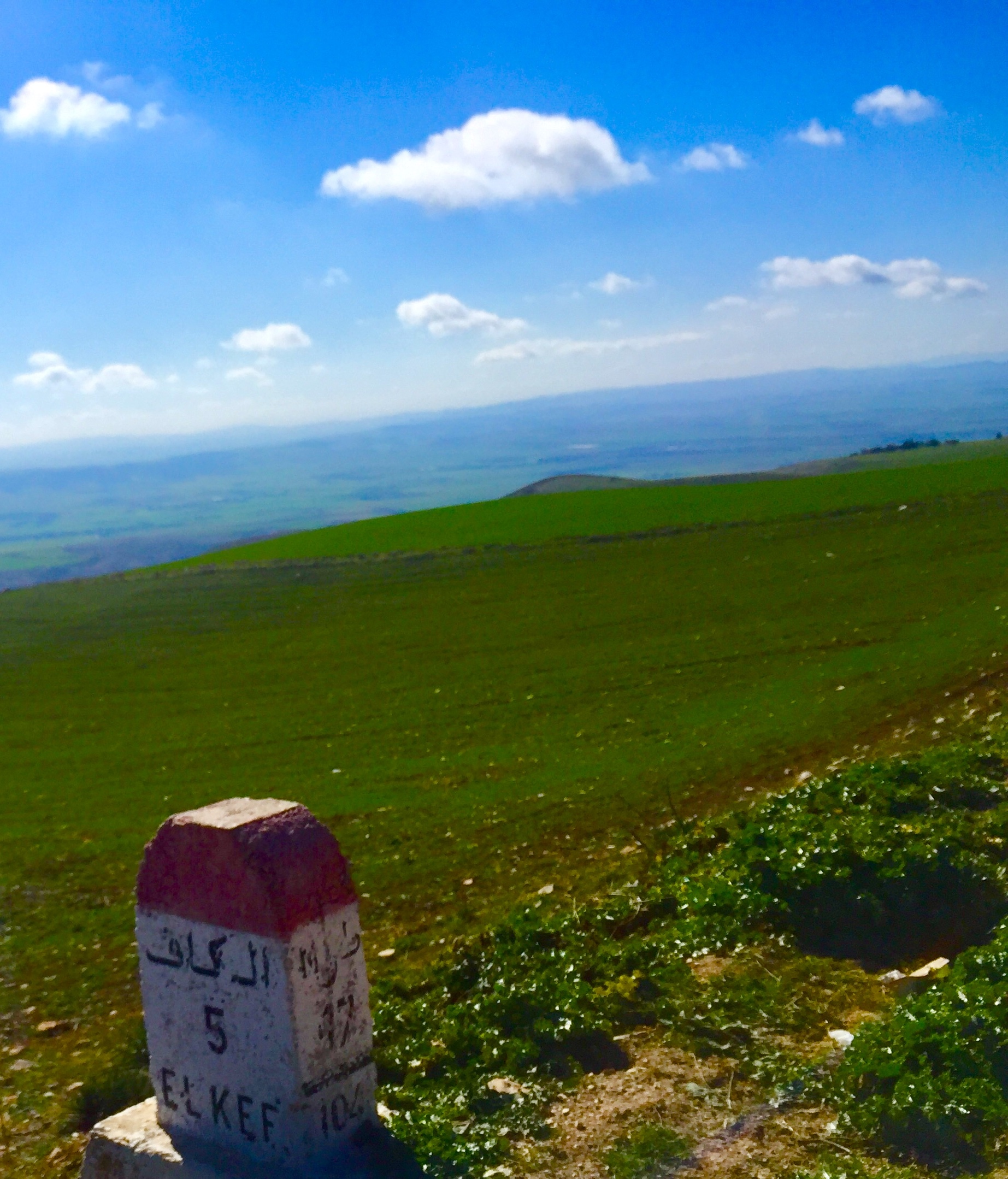
Landscape near El Kef

The highest-elevated city of Tunisia, at 780 metres (2,560 ft), its metropolitan area reaches 2,500 hectares (6,200 acres) of which 45 hectares (110 acres) lie within the interior of the old walled Medina quarter.

The municipality of El Kef is shared between two national delegates, East Kef and West Kef, which correspond to the two municipal boroughs.

== History ==
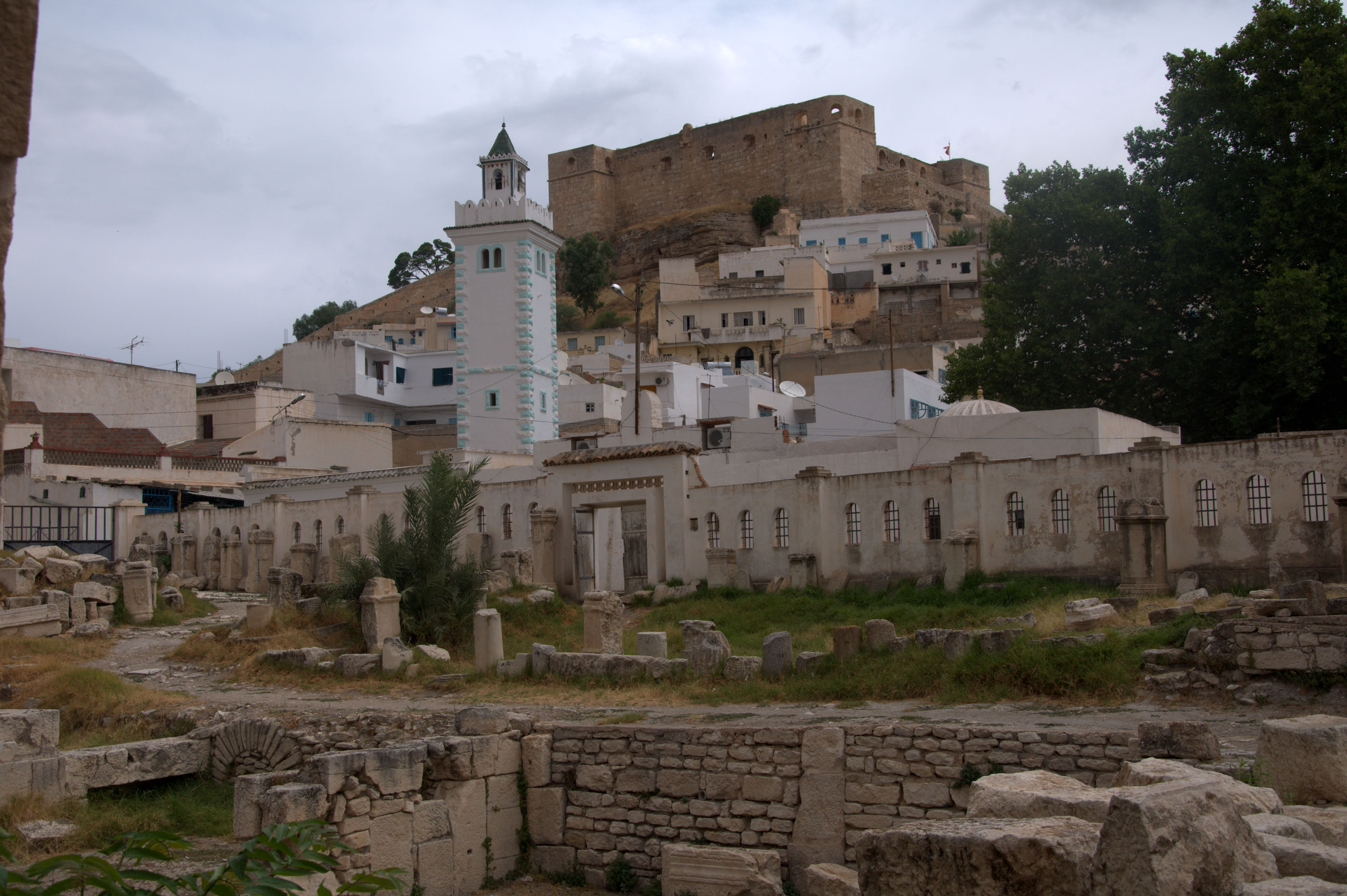
Ruins of Roman baths at the foot of the kasbah.

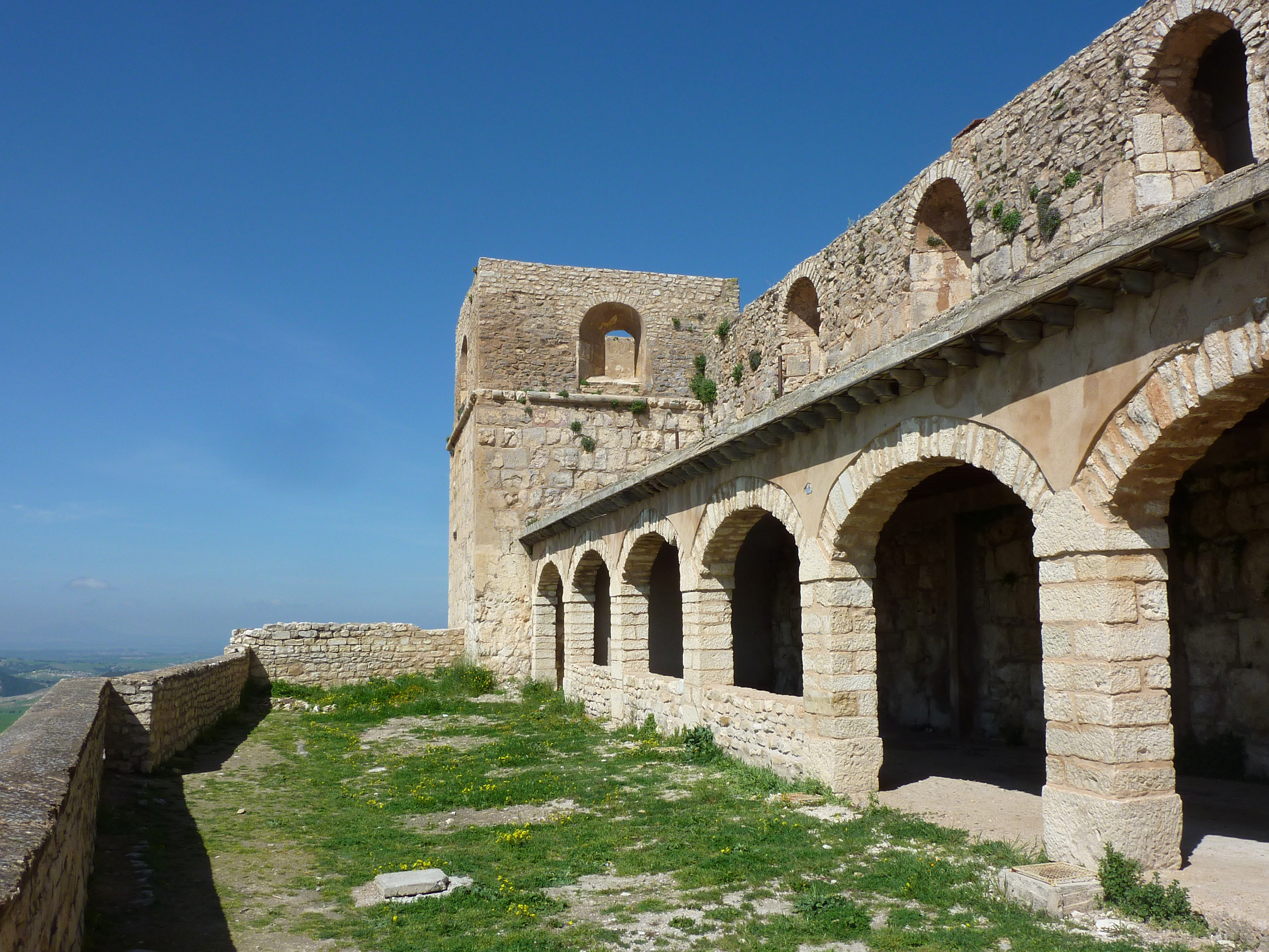
Kasbah of Le Kef (17th and 18th century).

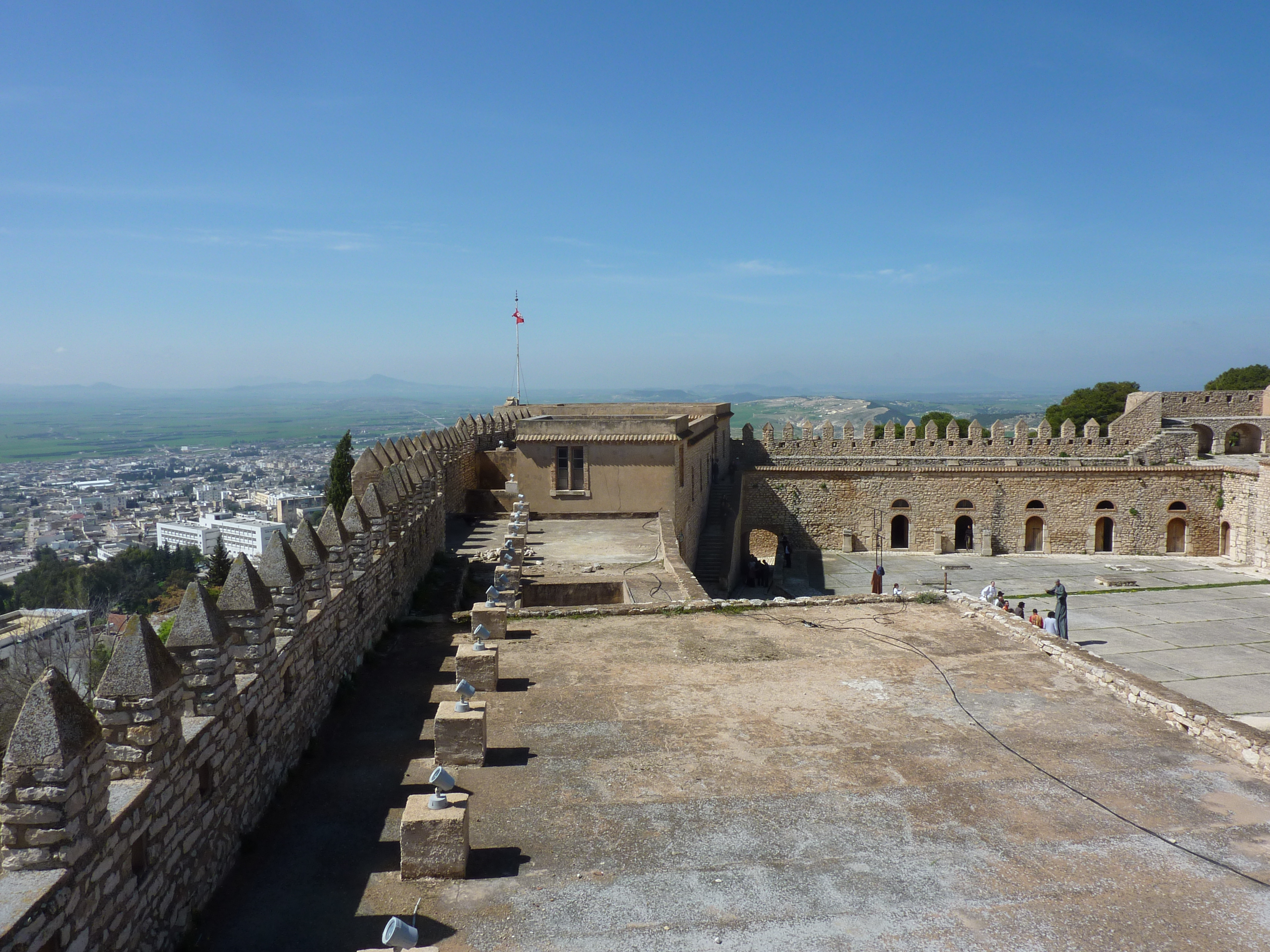
Kasbah of Le Kef and surroundings.

=== Etymology ===
First known by the name of Sicca during the Carthaginian era, then later Sicca Veneria during the rise of Roman domination, the city has carried numerous names throughout its history: Colonia Julia Cirta, Cirta Nova, Sikka Beneria, Shaqbanariya and finally El Kef since the 16th century.

=== Ancient times ===
El Kef has since ancient times been the principal city of the High-Tell Mountains and of the Tunisian northwest of which it constituted, until recently, the political center, the most important religious center, and the dominant stronghold.

The Roman colony of Sicca Veneria appears from the character of its worship of Venus to have been a Phoenician settlement. It was afterwards a Numidian stronghold, and under the Caesars became a fashionable residential city and one of the chief centres of Christianity in North Africa. The Christian apologist Arnobius the Elder lived here.

The Roman remains include fragments of a large temple dedicated to Hercules, and of the baths. The ancient cisterns remain. There are ruins of a Christian basilica, the apse being intact and the narthex serving as a church. Many stones with Roman inscriptions are built into the walls of houses.

In the early 5th century Apiarius of Sicca was a priest here, and instigated a dispute between the churches of Carthage and Rome concerning the jurisdiction of the Bishops of Africa when he appealed to the church of Rome against his excommunication by the church of Carthage.

Around 439, invading Vandals conquered the African Romans near the coast. Eventually, El Kef became part of the Berber Kingdom of Dorsale.

=== Umayyad conquest ===
In 688 AD, the city was raided during the Umayyad conquest of North Africa.

In the 17th century, a Kasbah of Le Kef was built to house a permanent garrison (ujaq); the construction was completed by the addition of fortified ramparts in 1740. This did not however prevent the taking and pillaging of the city by the Algerians in 1756, nor the occupation by the French military from 1881, following the partial collapse of the Ottoman Empire.

On July 8, 1884, the authorities of the new French Protectorate declared El Kef a municipality, one of the first in the country.

=== Contemporary ===
In 1973, there was a summit meeting here between the Tunisian president Habib Bourguiba and the Algerian president Houari Boumédiène. The latter proposed a constitution for a Tunisian-Algerian union which Bourguiba declined in favor of the development of economic cooperation between the two countries.

== Climate ==
The climate is usually unstable, ranging from summer heat waves to winter snow blizzards.

Climate data for El Kef (1991–2020, extremes 1951–present)
Month	Jan	Feb	Mar	Apr	May	Jun	Jul	Aug	Sep	Oct	Nov	Dec	Year
Record high °C (°F)	25.0 (77.0)	31.5 (88.7)	34.4 (93.9)	36.3 (97.3)	42.4 (108.3)	44.6 (112.3)	46.5 (115.7)	47.0 (116.6)	42.6 (108.7)	37.9 (100.2)	30.7 (87.3)	28.0 (82.4)	47.0 (116.6)
Mean daily maximum °C (°F)	13.7 (56.7)	14.5 (58.1)	17.9 (64.2)	21.5 (70.7)	27.0 (80.6)	32.5 (90.5)	36.0 (96.8)	35.7 (96.3)	30.3 (86.5)	25.6 (78.1)	19.0 (66.2)	14.8 (58.6)	24.0 (75.2)
Daily mean °C (°F)	8.4 (47.1)	8.9 (48.0)	11.4 (52.5)	14.5 (58.1)	19.2 (66.6)	24.1 (75.4)	27.2 (81.0)	27.3 (81.1)	23.3 (73.9)	19.0 (66.2)	13.2 (55.8)	9.6 (49.3)	17.2 (63.0)
Mean daily minimum °C (°F)	3.0 (37.4)	3.2 (37.8)	5.0 (41.0)	7.5 (45.5)	11.4 (52.5)	15.7 (60.3)	18.4 (65.1)	18.8 (65.8)	16.3 (61.3)	12.4 (54.3)	7.5 (45.5)	4.4 (39.9)	10.3 (50.5)
Record low °C (°F)	−6.0 (21.2)	−5.0 (23.0)	−5.0 (23.0)	−4.0 (24.8)	1.2 (34.2)	4.0 (39.2)	8.5 (47.3)	9.0 (48.2)	2.5 (36.5)	1.0 (33.8)	−3.0 (26.6)	−5.0 (23.0)	−6.0 (21.2)
Average precipitation mm (inches)	60.5 (2.38)	44.0 (1.73)	50.5 (1.99)	45.2 (1.78)	45.3 (1.78)	23.5 (0.93)	8.1 (0.32)	19.9 (0.78)	43.0 (1.69)	37.2 (1.46)	45.5 (1.79)	49.1 (1.93)	472.0 (18.58)
Average precipitation days (≥ 1.0 mm)	7.6	6.8	7.2	6.3	5.4	3.2	1.3	3.3	5.6	5.1	5.7	7.2	64.7
Average relative humidity (%)	79.0	76.0	75.0	73.5	68.5	64.2	57.7	59.6	67.3	71.9	76.1	79.5	70.7
Mean monthly sunshine hours	163.6	171.9	216.0	224.9	276.6	307.8	348.5	305.7	240.9	216.9	174.9	151.2	2,798.9
Source 1: Institut National de la Météorologie (humidity 1961-1990, sun 1981–2010) (Note: The Station ID for Le Kef is 23232111.)
Source 2: NOAA

== Main sights ==
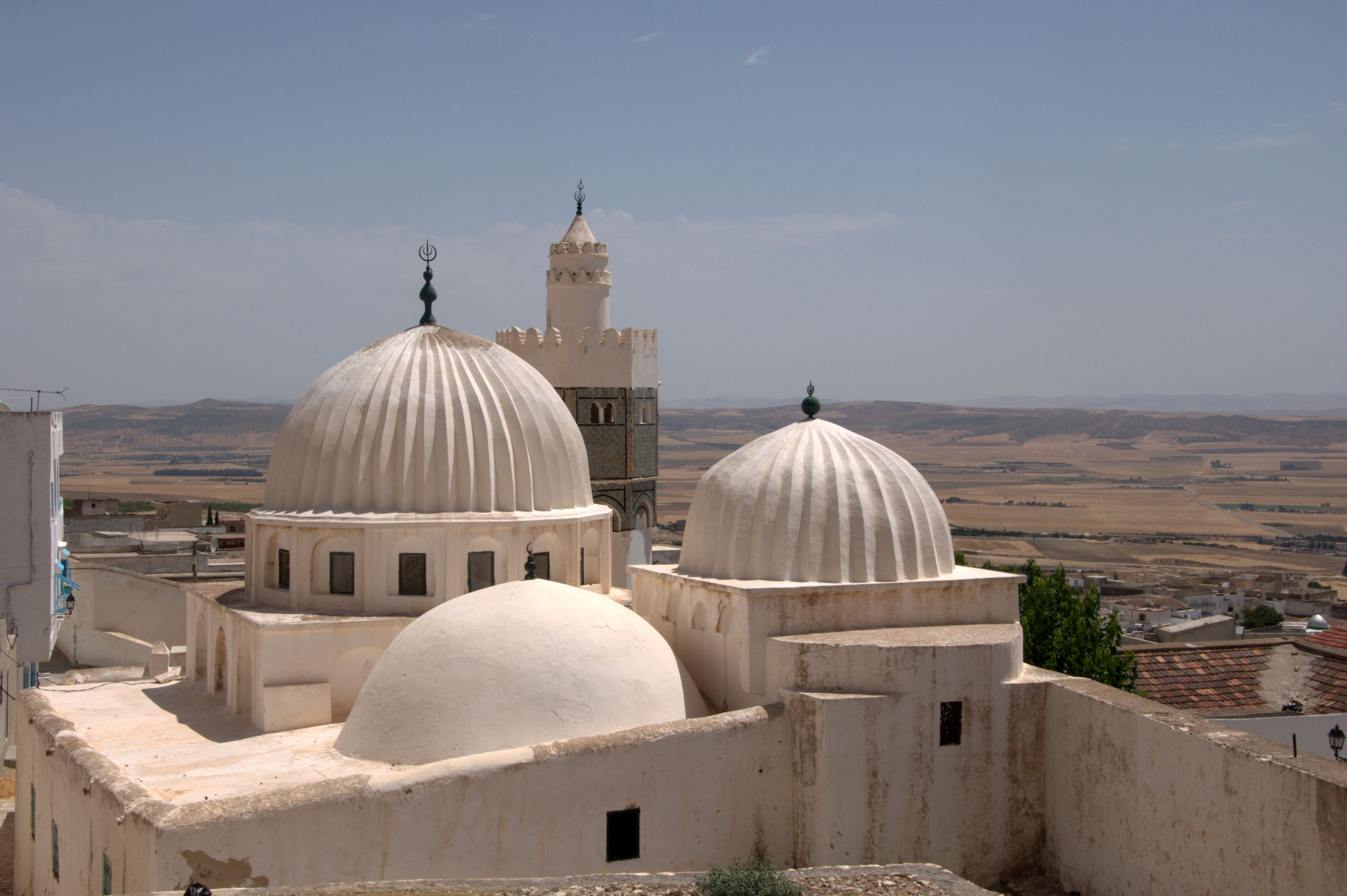
Domes of the Sidi Bou Makhlouf Mausoleum.

El Kef contains a certain number of Islamic religious edifices, in its role as the center of a Sufi movement. The Sidi Bou Makhlouf Mausoleum is believed to hold the tomb of the founder of the Aissawa order in Tunisia, Sidi Bou Makhlouf. El-Qadiriyya Mosque is also a significant Sufi mosque, particularly for the Qadiriyya order.

A legacy of the old local Jewish community, the synagogue of the Ghriba is the object of veneration by Jews of the region, who come in pilgrimage each year during the week marked by the festival of Sukkot.

In the city is the mausoleum of Ali Tukie, the father of Al-Husayn I ibn Ali at-Turki, founder of the Husainid dynasty which ruled Tunisia from 1705 to 1957.

The vestiges, well preserved, of a three-naved Roman basilica dating from the beginning of the 5th century named Dar El Kous, dedicated to Saint Peter, have been discovered.

The enormous Jugurtha Tableland mesa is visible from El Kef.

== Culture ==
=== Museums ===
The Museum of the Popular Arts and Traditions of El Kef, housed within a museum built in the 18th century, presents collections which retrace the social habits and customs which prevailed before the independence of the country.

=== Music ===
The Bou Makhlouf festival is held in July each year. The Saliha Festival is held once every other year. The latter takes its name from the singer Saliha who hails from the region.

=== Performing arts ===
It is the seat of the National Center for the Dramatic and Scenic Arts of El Kef. The city also organizes the festival of "24 hours of non-stop theatre".

=== Cuisine ===
The cuisine of El Kef has two recipes specific to the region. First, a typical regional bread, mjamaa or khobz el aid, is prepared at festival times, covered with an egg and decorated with pastry. Second, borzgane is a type of couscous lightly sweetened by alternating layers of dry fruits, dates, and lamb meat.

The Festival of Mayou, also known as the Festival of Borzgane, brings the traditional Keffish couscous up to contemporary taste.

== Government ==
The city council is composed of 22 members, including a president, vice president, borough chief, six assistants and thirteen counselors.

== Education ==
Schools, institutes, and faculties include the El Kef Higher Institute of Applied Studies in the Humanities, El Kef Higher Institute of Music and Theatre, El Kef Higher Institute of Information Technology, El Kef Higher Institute of Physical Education, El Kef Graduate School of Agriculture, and El Kef Higher Institute of Nursing Science.

== Media ==
Radio Le Kef, the regional radio service founded November 7, 1991, covers the northwest of the country.

== Transportation ==
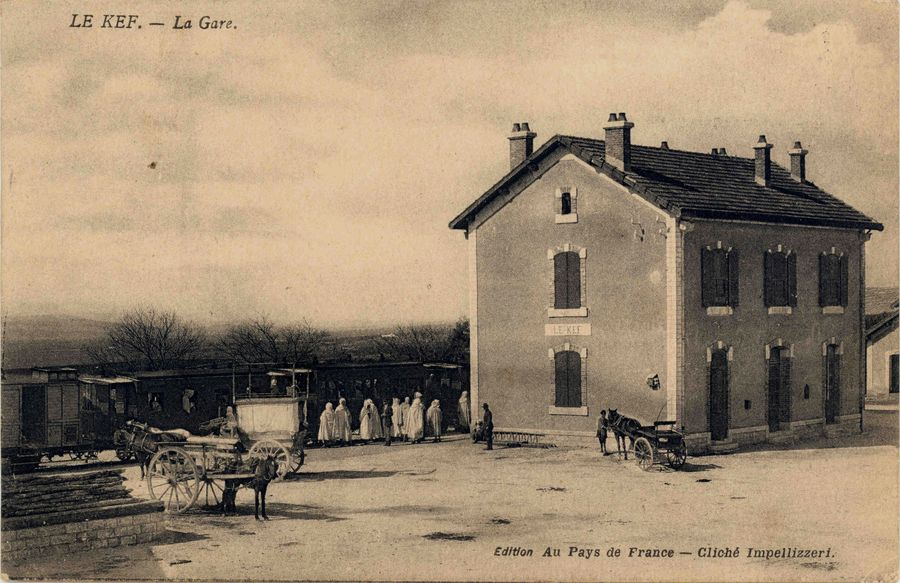
Gare of El Kef

The transportation company of El Kef is the only company offering a public transit service by bus. The city is linked with surrounding cities by a network of taxis called louage, and with the capital, Tunis, by a regional railway line passing through Dahmani.

== Sports ==
In sports, the Olympique du Kef, city soccer club founded in 1922 won the 2009-2010 League II Championship.

The El Kef Higher Institute of Sport and Physical Education runs the annual Tunisian Women's Soccer Championship.

== Sister-city ==
El Kef has had a sister-city relationship since 1993 with Bourg-en-Bresse, France, officially sealed in 1999 and 2000 with the signing of an agreement of exchange and friendship.

== Media references ==
In 1855, John Henry Newman published a novel, Callista, which was set in Sicca Veneria in the 3rd century AD (Roman era).

== People ==
- Lactantius (c. 250-325), early Christian writer, advisor to Roman emperor Constantine.
- Arnobius ( d. 330), mentioned by Jerome as being a teacher in Sicca Veneria.
- Caelius Aurelianus, c. 5th century physician and medical writer, he translated works by Soranus from Greek into Latin.
- St. Fulgentius of Ruspe was ordered to be scourged here by an Arian priest in 499

== Gallery ==
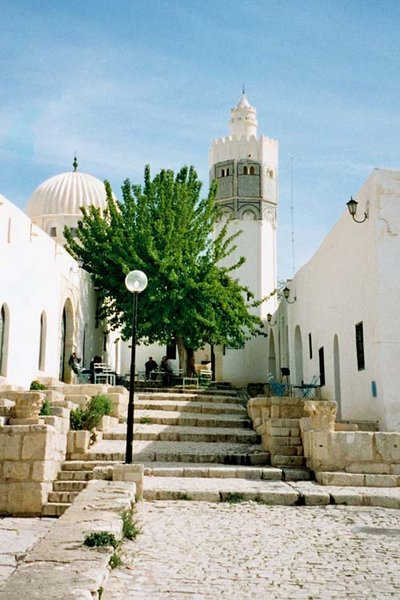

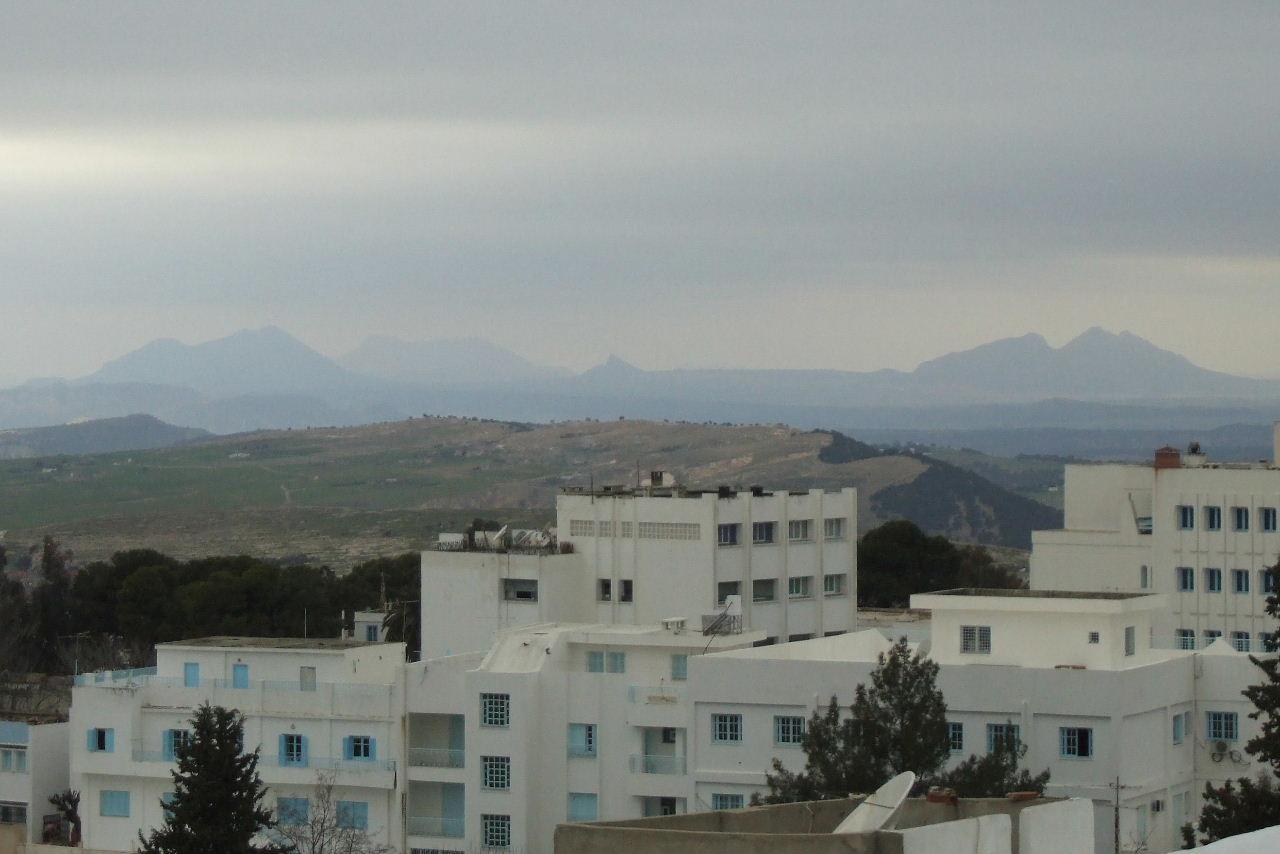

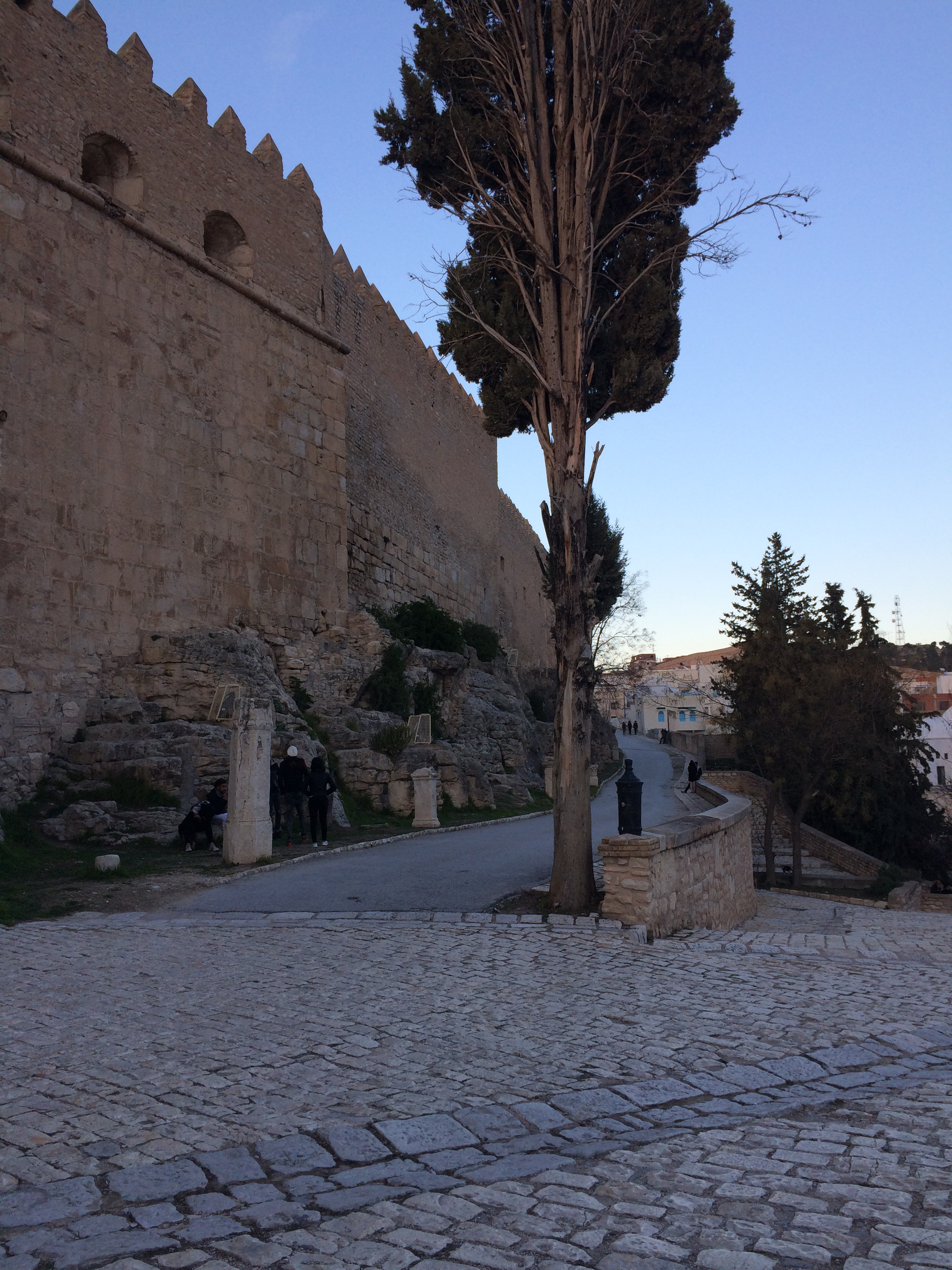

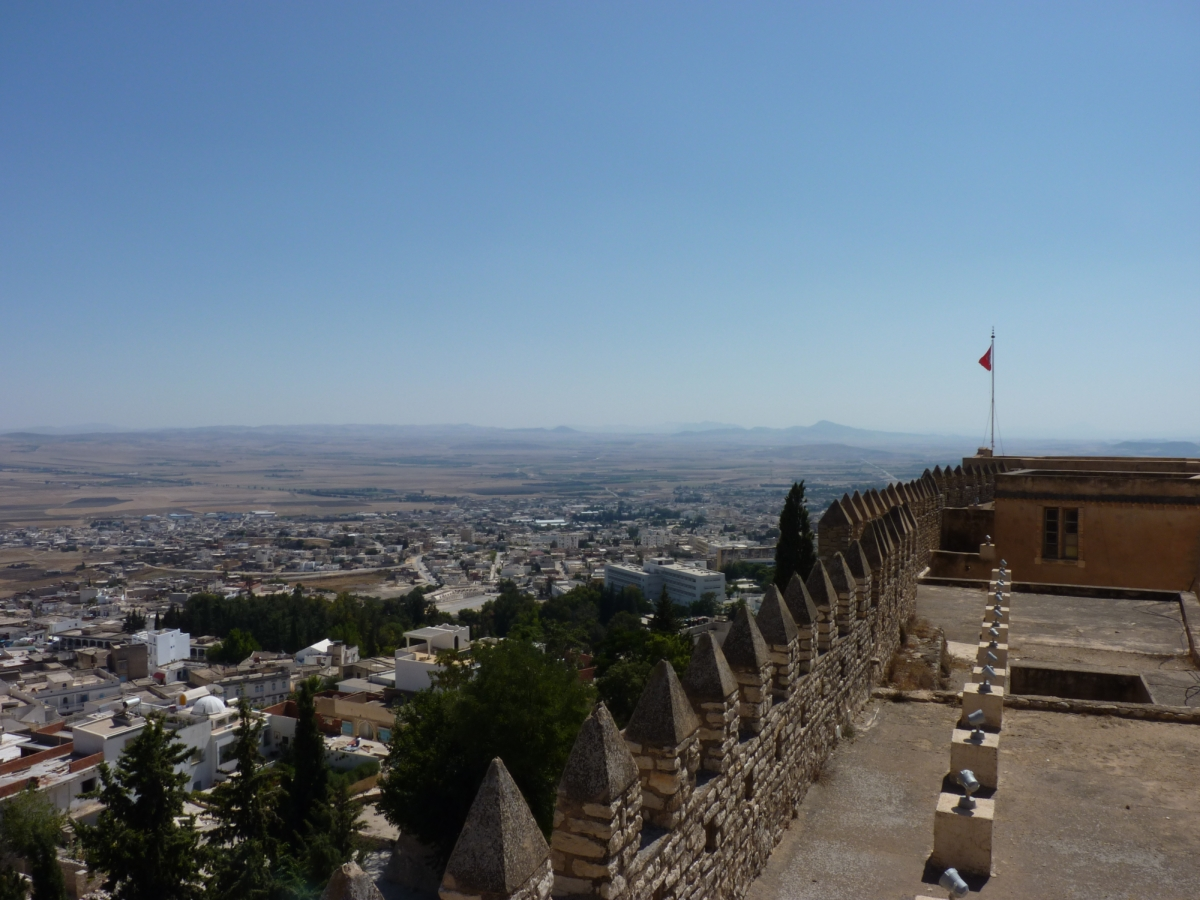

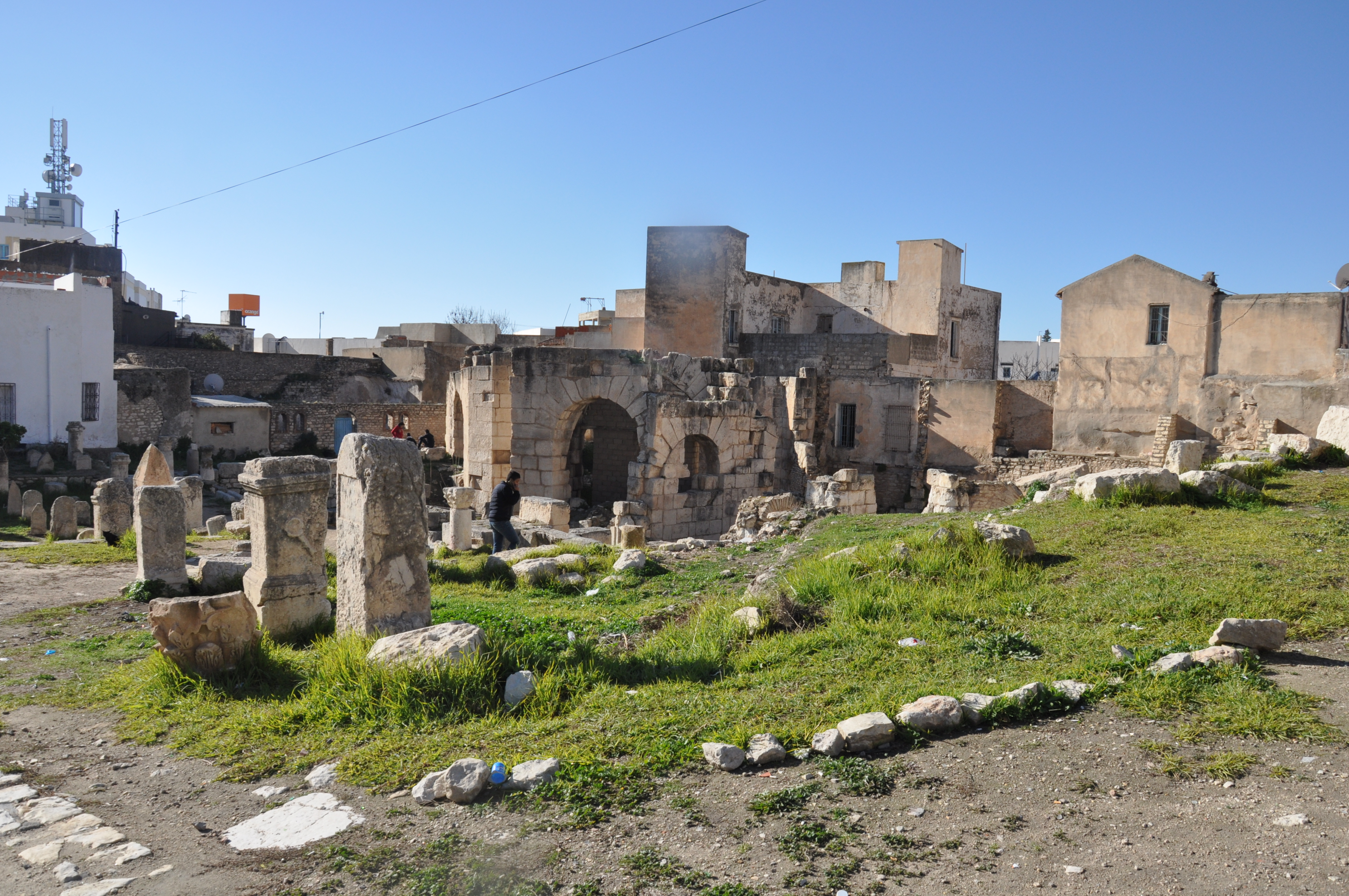

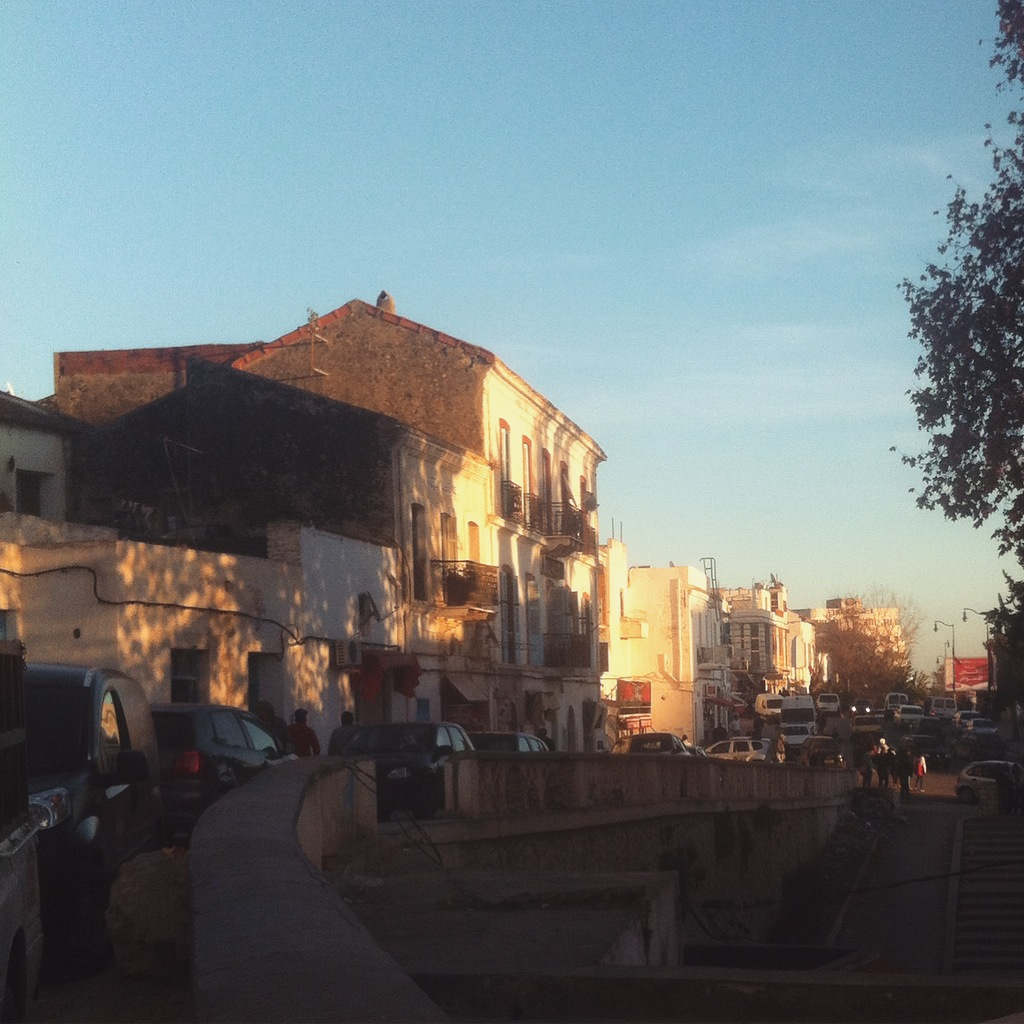

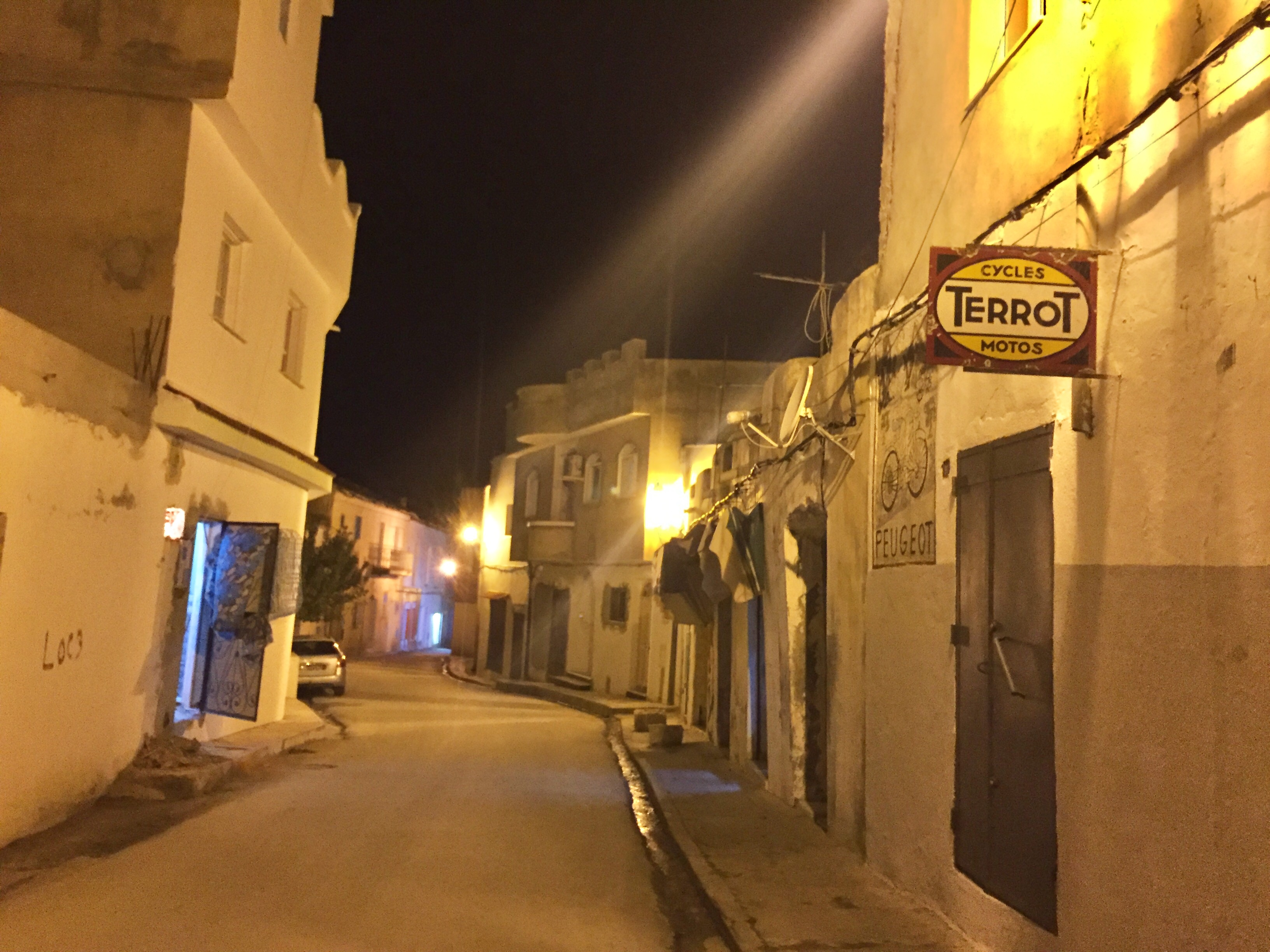

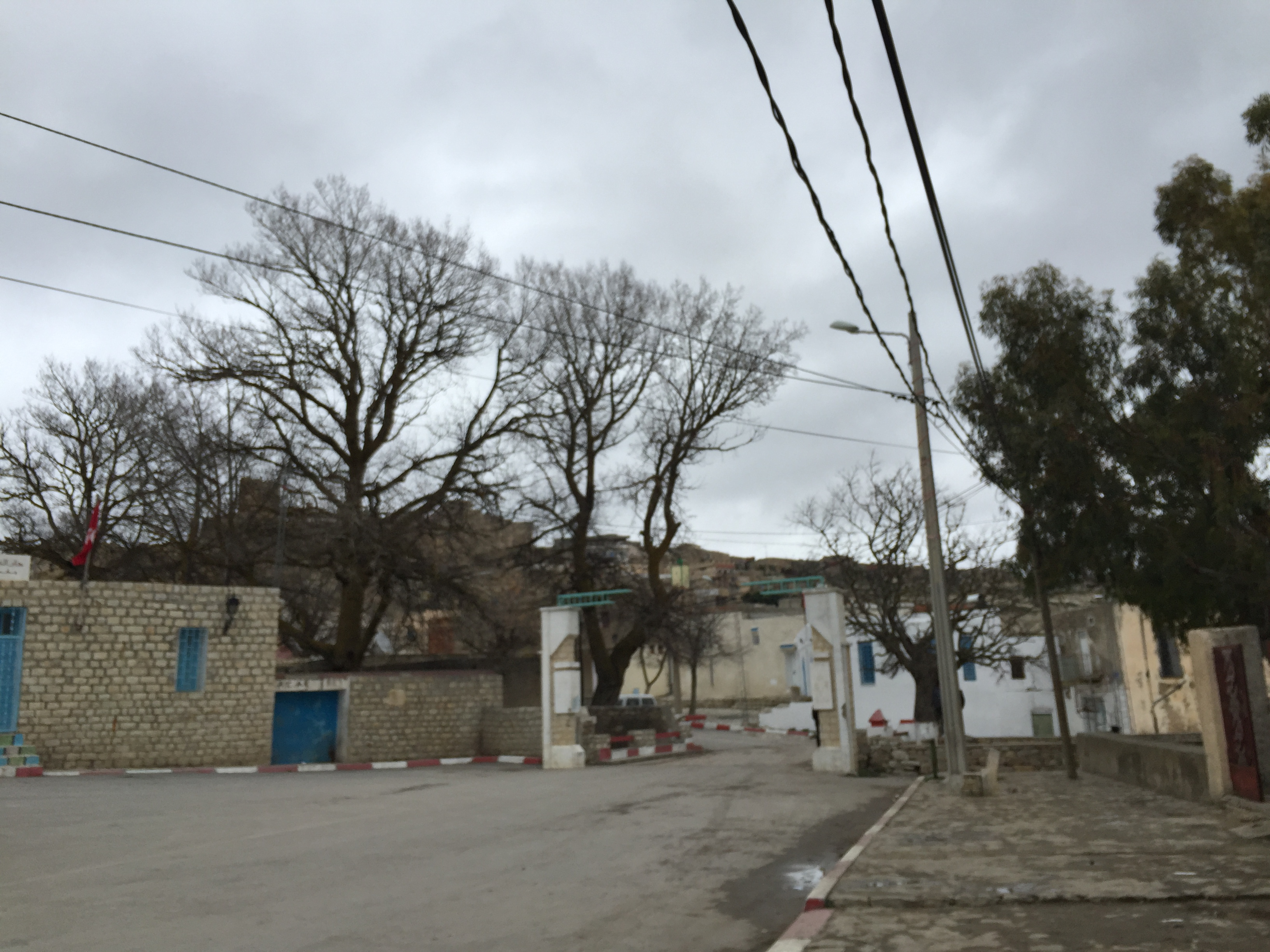

== Sources ==
- Tahar Ayachi, El Kef, éd. Office national du tourisme tunisien, Tunis, 2007
- Abdelhamid Larguèche [sous la dir. de], Revoir El Kef, éd. MC-Editions, Carthage, 2005 ISBN 9973-807-50-2
- Camille Mifort, Vivre au Kef. Quand la Tunisie était française, éd. MC-Editions, Carthage, 2008
- Cornelia Smet, Si ma grand-mère était Keffoise, éd. MC-Editions, Carthage, 2005 ISBN 9973-807-55-3
