= Sakiet Sidi Youssef =

Sakiet Sidi Youssef ساقية سيدي يوسف
- Commune and town
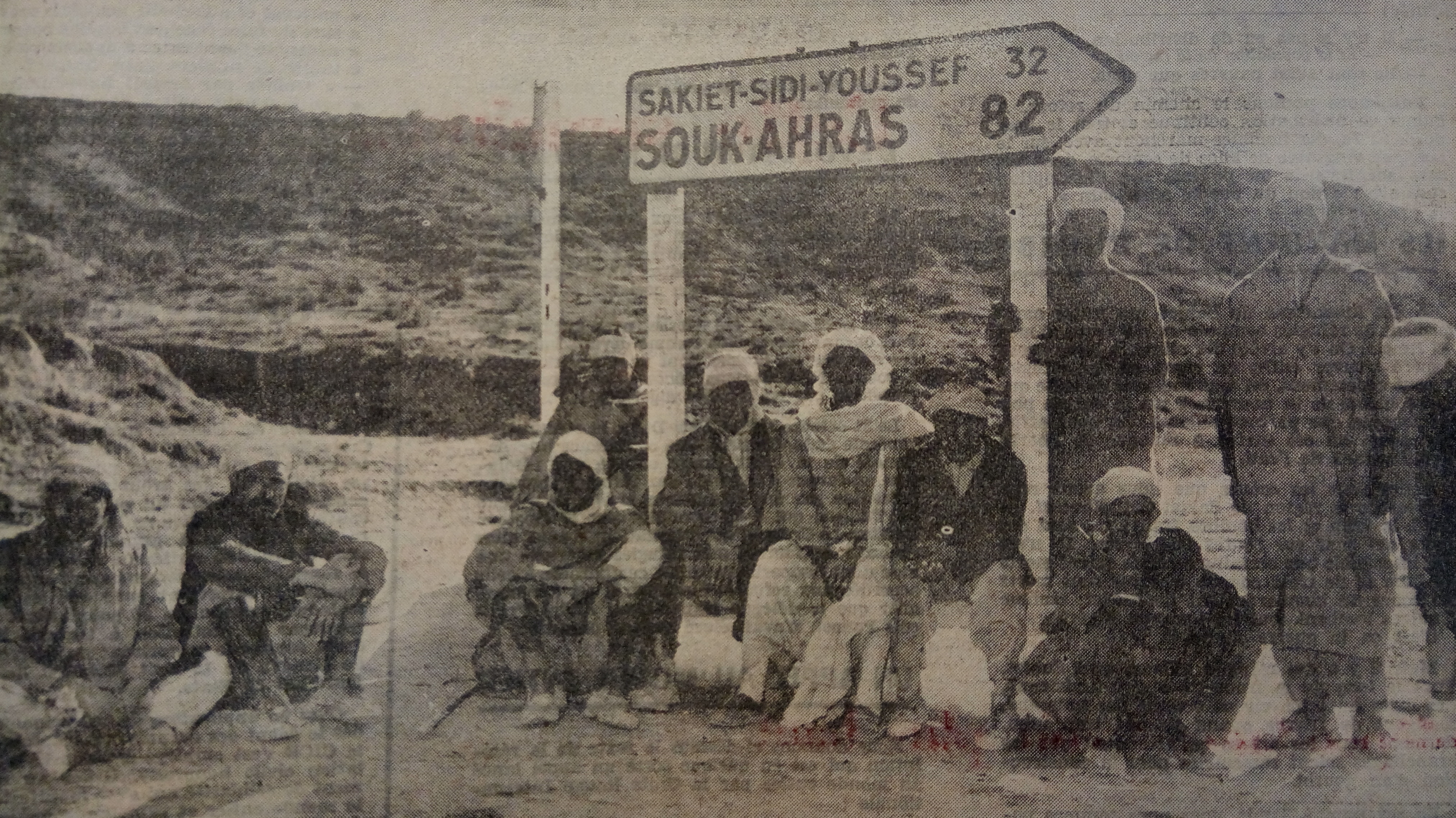
- Sign pointed towards Sakiet Sidi Youssef

- Location within Tunisia
- Coordinates: 36°13′25.43″N 8°21′22.05″E
- Country: Tunisia
- Governorate: Kef Governorate
- Elevation: 808 m (2,651 ft)

Population (2014)
  - Total: 6,335
- Time zone: UTC+1 (CET)

Sakiet Sidi Youssef (Tunisian Arabic: ساقية سيدي يوسف) is a town and commune in the Kef Governorate, Tunisia, near the border with Algeria. As of 2014, it had a population of 6,335.

== History ==
In Roman times, the town was known as Naraggara. Roman historian Livy says that the Battle of Zama at the conclusion of the Second Punic War in 202 BCE took place near Naraggara.

On 8 February 1958, it was bombarded by French forces in the belief that it was serving as a refuge for Algerian independence fighters. About 20 French bombers and fighters attacked causing at least 70 deaths and 130 wounded. This event sparked an international outcry and helped precipitate the end of the Algerian War.

== See also ==
- List of cities in Tunisia
- Bizerte crisis
