= Kef Governorate =

Governorate of Tunisia

Kef ولاية الكاف
- Governorate
- Map of Tunisia with Kef highlighted

- Subdivisions of Kef Governorate
- Coordinates: 36°10′56″N 8°42′53″E
- Country: Tunisia
- Created: 21 June 1956
- Capital: El Kef

Government
  - Governor: Walid Kabbia (since 2024)

Area
  - Total: 4,965 km^{2} (1,917 sq mi)
  - Rank: Ranked 10th of 24

Population (2014)
  - Total: 243,156
  - Rank: Ranked 19th of 24
  - Density: 48.97/km^{2} (126.8/sq mi)
- Time zone: UTC+01 (CET)
- Postal prefix: xx
- ISO 3166 code: TN-33

Kef Governorate (Tunisian Arabic: ولاية الكاف Wilāyat el-Kāf pronounced [lke̞ːf]; French: Gouvernorat du Kef) is one of the twenty-four governorates of Tunisia. It comprises chiefly part of the dorsal Atlas Mountains and their foothills in north-western Tunisia, bordering Algeria. It covers an area of 4,965 km^{2} and has a population of 243,156 (2014 census). The capital is El Kef. The region is primarily agricultural and mining. The agricultural land, which accounts for 98% of the total area of the governorate, is vast and fertile (485,153 hectares, including 102,215 hectares of forest and 337,489 hectares of agricultural land), enabling it to contribute 4.9% to national agricultural production.

== Administrative divisions ==
Twelve municipalities are in Kef Governorate:

2311	El Kef	67,039
2312	Nebeur	12,987
2313	Touiref	5,863
2314	Sakiet Sidi Youssef	16,173
2315	Tajerouine	25,742
2316	Menzel Salem	1,370
2317	Kalaat Senan	13,517
2318	Kalâat Khasba	5,663
2319	Jérissa	8,613
2320	El Ksour	14,686
2321	Dahmani	25,285
2322	Sers	17,730
	Bahra	5,664
	El Marja	5,294
	Zaafrane - Dir Kef	12,060

== Demographics ==
Due to its close proximity to the Algerian border and its historical role in the Algerian War of Independence, Kef has a significant Algerian population, hosting over 6,000 registered Algerian voters, the second largest such community in Tunisia after Tunis. Its capital city, El Kef, was the command centre of the Front de Libération Nationale during the Algerian War of Independence against the French in the 1950s.
