= Bizerte crisis =

1961 conflict between France and Tunisia

- Part of the decolonisation of Africa and the spillover of the Algerian War
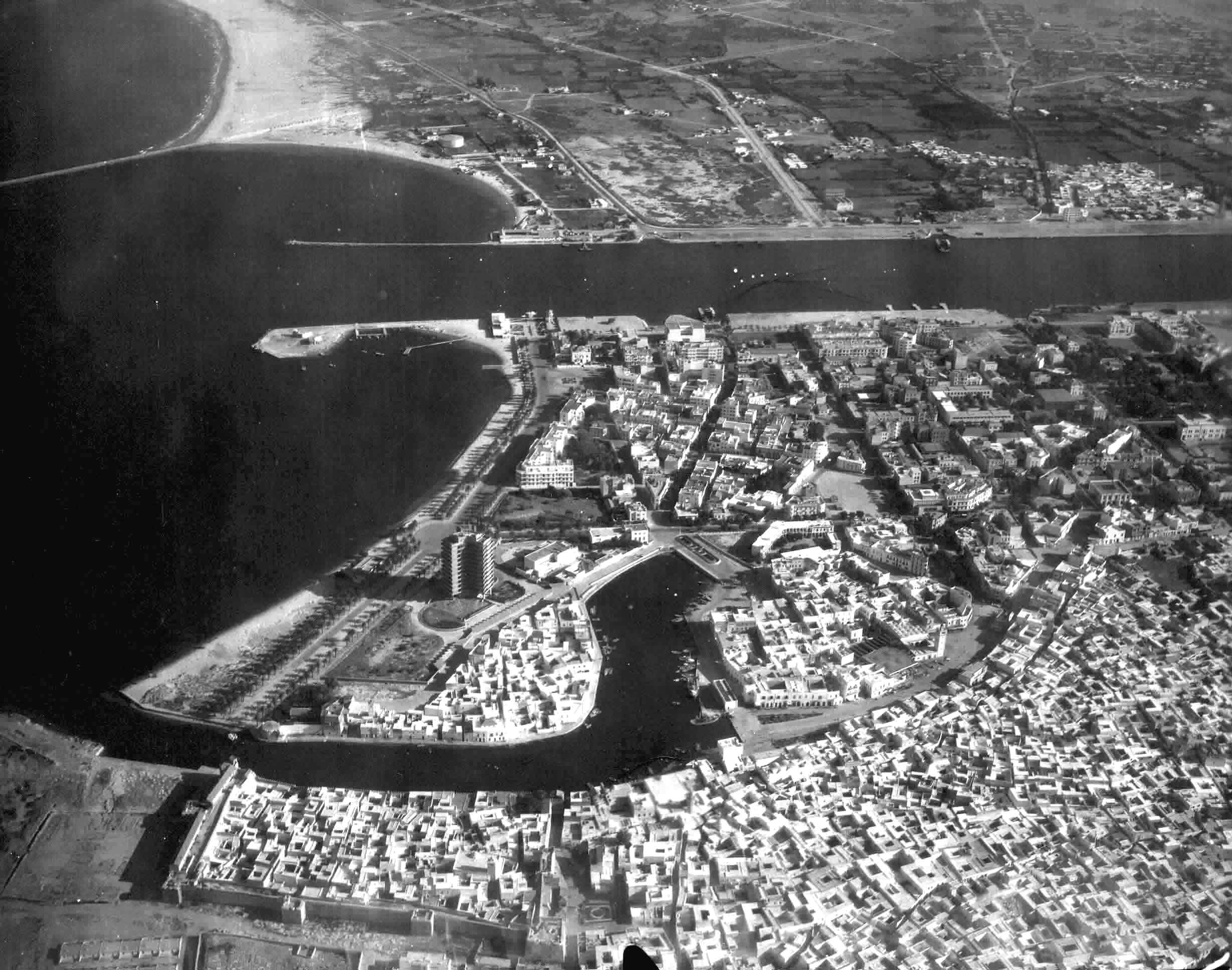
- Bizerte in 1961
Date	19–23 July 1961
Location	Bizerte, Tunisia
Result	French victory

Belligerents
France	Tunisia

Commanders and leaders
(France) Charles de Gaulle (France) Maurice Amman	(Tunisia) Habib Bourguiba (Tunisia) Noureddine Boujellabia (Tunisia) Abdelhamid Ben Cheikh (Tunisia) Mohamed Ben Hamida El Bejaoui †

Strength
7,000; 3 cruisers	10,000

Casualties and losses
24+ killed 100+ wounded	630 killed 1,555 wounded multiple civilians killed

The Bizerte crisis (French: Crise de Bizerte; Arabic: أحداث بنزرت, romanized: ʾAḥdāth Bīnzart) occurred in July 1961 when Tunisia imposed a blockade on the French naval base at Bizerte, Tunisia, hoping to force its evacuation. The crisis culminated in a three-day battle between French and Tunisian forces that left 630 Tunisians and 24 French dead.

Military zone of Bizerte–Ferryville

Military zone in southern Tunisia

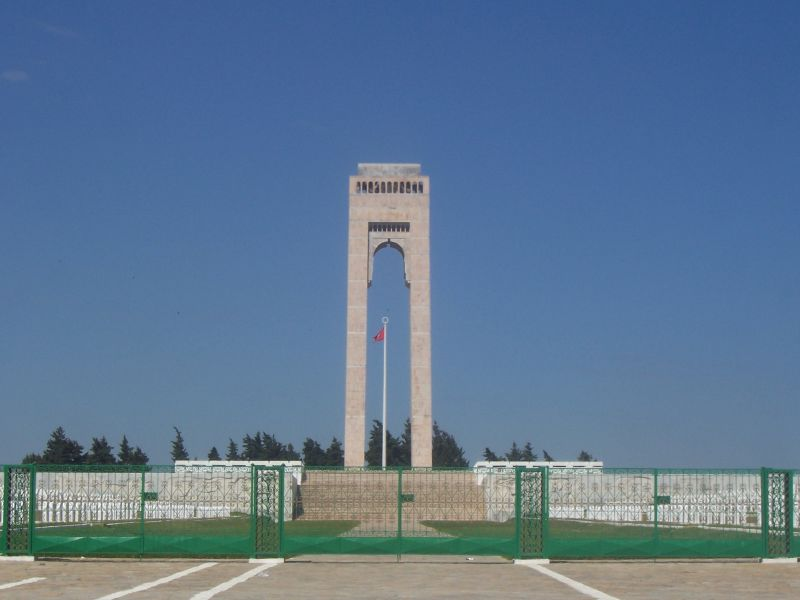
Bizerte Martyrs monument

== Background ==
After Tunisia gained independence from France in 1956, France remained in control of the city and its naval base, a strategic port on the Mediterranean, which played an important part in French operations during the Algerian War. France had promised to negotiate the future of the base, but had so far refused to remove it. Tunisia was further infuriated upon learning that France planned to expand the airbase.

In 1961, Tunisian forces surrounded and blockaded the naval base in hopes of forcing France to abandon its last holdings in the country. After Tunisia warned France against any violations of Tunisian airspace, the French defiantly sent a helicopter. Tunisian troops responded by firing warning shots.

In response to the blockade, 800 French paratroopers were sent in by the French as a show of force, but when the transport planes with the paratroopers landed on the airfield, Tunisian troops engaged them with targeted machine gun fire. In response, French jets supported by troops armed with 105 mm howitzers attacked the Tunisian roadblocks, destroying them completely. French tanks and armoured cars then rolled into Tunisian territory, and fired into the town of Ferryville, killing 27 soldiers and civilians. The following day, the French launched a full-scale invasion of the town of Bizerte. The Tunisians' few artillery posts were destroyed by rockets fired by French planes. Tanks and paratroopers penetrated into the city from the south, while marines stormed the harbour from landing craft. Three French cruisers were positioned offshore. Tunisian soldiers, paramilitaries, and hastily organised civilian volunteers engaged the French in heavy street fighting, but were forced back by vastly superior French forces. The French overran the town on 23 July 1961.

== Aftermath ==
Initially the United Nations was unable to carry out any sort of substantial action against the French, which angered the Tunisian authorities. The French finally handed Bizerte over on 15 October 1963, after the conclusion of the Algerian War.

== See also ==
- Tunisian independence
- Battles of the French evacuation from Tunisia
- Bombing of Sakiet Sidi Youssef
- List of Commandants Superior of the Strategic Base of Bizerte
