= Kasba =

Kasba may refer to:

- Kasbah, a type of citadel or walled town
- Kasba Ganapati, the main Ganesh temple in Pune
- Kasba, Kolkata, a neighbourhood in Kolkata, India
- Kasba (Purnia), a town in Purnia district, Bihar, India
- Kasba, Uttar Dinajpur, a town in North Dinajpur, West Bengal, India
- Kasba Upazila in Brahmanbaria, Chittagong, Bangladesh
- Bara Kasba, a village in Barisal District, Bangladesh
- Chhota Kasba, a village in Barisal District, Bangladesh
- Kasba, Kolkata (Vidhan Sabha constituency)
- Kasba, Purnia (Vidhan Sabha constituency)
- Kasba, Bardhaman, a village in Bardhaman District, West Bengal, India
- Kasba Lake, Canadian lake in Northwest Territories
- Kasba (film), a 1991 Indian film
- Kasba Peth, a locality or area in most of the cities in Maharashtra, India
- Kasbagoas, a village in Murshidabad district, West Bengal, India

== See also ==
- Casbah (disambiguation)
- Kasaba (disambiguation)
