= Ghada =

Ghada (Arabic: غادة) is a feminine given name of Arabic origin used predominantly in Arab countries, but also in non-Arab countries around the world. In Arabic, it refers to women who are attractive and graceful.

It may also refer to a small tree: Haloxylon persicum.

== Given name ==
- Ghada Abdel Aal (born 1978), Egyptian author
- Ghada Adel (born 1974), Egyptian actress
- Ghada Ali (born 1989), Libyan athlete
- Ghada Amer (born 1963), Egyptian contemporary artist living and working in New York City
- Ghada Aoun (born 1957), Lebanese judge
- Ghada Chreim Ata (born 1968), Lebanese politician
- Ghada Ayadi (born 1992), Tunisian football player
- Ghada Hassine (born 1993), Tunisian weightlifter
- Ghada Jamal (artist) (born 1955), Lebanese abstract artist
- Ghada Jamshir, Bahraini women's rights activist and campaigner for the reform of Sharia courts in Bahrain and the Arab States of the Persian Gulf
- Ghada Karmi (born 1939), Palestinian doctor of medicine, author and academic
- Ghada Owais (born 1977), Lebanese journalist
- Ghada Abdel Razek (born 1965), Egyptian actress
- Ghada al-Samman (born 1942), Arab Syrian writer, journalist and novelist born in Damascus
- Ghada Shouaa (born 1972), Syrian former heptathlete
- Ghada Waly (born 1965), Egyptian politician
