= Casbah (disambiguation) =

A casbah or kasbah (Arabic: القصبة, romanized: al-qasaba), is a kind of medina (old city) or fortress.

Casbah and similar may refer to:

== Notable casbahs ==
- Casbah of Algiers, in Algiers, Algeria
- Casbah of Dellys, in Dellys, Algeria
- Kasbah of Agadir, in Agadir, Morocco
- Kasbah An-Nouar, in Fez, Morocco
- Kasbah of Béja, in Béja, Tunisia
- Kasbah Boulaouane, in Boulaouane, Morocco
- Kasbah Cherarda, in Fez, Morocco
- Kasbah of Le Kef, in El Kef, Tunisia
- Kasbah Mahdiyya, near Kenitra, Morocco
- Kasbah of Marrakesh, in Marrakesh, Morocco
- Kasbah of Moulay Ismail, in Meknes, Morocco
- Kasbah of Tifoultoute, in Ouarzazate, Morocco
- Kasbah of Sfax, in Sfax, Tunisia
- Kasbah of the Udayas, in Rabat, Morocco
- Tamnougalt, in Tamnougalt, Morocco
- Telouet Kasbah, in Telouet, Morocco

== Other uses ==
- Casbah City, a 2017 Algerian TV series
- The Casbah (music venue), in San Diego, US
- Casbah Coffee Club (also known as The Casbah), a former music venue in Liverpool, England
- Casbah Recording Studio, in California, US
- Casbah (film), a 1948 musical film
- Cloud access security broker (CASB) (sometimes pronounced "cas-bah"), security software for cloud computing
- Kasba Tadla, a town in Béni-Mellal Province, Morocco

== See also ==
- Kasba (disambiguation)
- "Rock the Casbah", a 1982 song by The Clash
- CASBAA, association for TV broadcast service providers in Asia
- Qasba, a Maltese unit of measurement equal to approximately 2.096m
