= Mohamed Sayari =

Tunisian actor and theatre director (born 1957)

- Born: 31 January 1957 (age 69); Béja, Tunisia
- Occupation: Actor/theatre director
- Years active: 1974–present

Mohamed Sayari (born 31 January 1957, in Béja) is a Tunisian actor and theatre director. He's famous for notable movies, TV series and plays.

== Art works ==
=== Cinema ===
- 1989: La Barbare (The Barbarian) by Mireille Darc
- 1992: Le Sultan de la médina (The Sultan of the Medina) by Moncef Dhouib
- 2008: Bab Al Samah by Francesco Sperandeo
- 2011:
  - Or noir (Black gold) by Jean-Jacques Annaud
  - The Bottom of the Well (short film) by Moez Ben Hassen
  - Nesma (Current of air) by Homeïda Behi
- 2013: Late Spring (short film) by Zachary Kerschberg
- 2019: Porto Farina by Ibrahim Letaief: Mongi
- 2022: The Island of Forgiveness by Ridha Béhi: Abraham

=== Television ===
- 1974: Affaires (Business)
- 1982: La Nouvelle Malle des Indes (The New Indian Trunk) by Christian-Jaque: Kareem
- 1983:
  - Secret diplomatique (Diplomatic Secret) by Denys de La Patellière
  - La Nuit tunisienne (The Tunisian Night)
- 1994: Ghada by Mohamed Hadj Slimane: Brother of Amina
- 1997: Al Motahadi (The challenger) by Moncef Kateb: Lassaad
- 2008: House of Saddam by Alex Holmes, Jim O'Hanlon and Stephen Butchard: banker
- 2011: L'ombra del destino (The Shadow of Destiny) (Italian) by Pier Belloni
- 2012:
  - Min Ajel Ouyoun Catherine (For the beautiful eyes of Catherine) by Hamadi Arafa: Rachid A'wam
  - La Fuite de Carthage (The Flight from Carthage) by Madih Belaid (television documentary film)
  - Njoum Ellil (The stars of the night) (season 4) by Mehdi Nasra: Brahim
- 2014: Maktoub (Destiny) (season 4) by Sami Fehri: Kais Ben Ahmed
- 2015: Le Risque (The Risk) by Nasreddine Shili and Mohamed Ali Damak
- 2015–2017: Awled Moufida (The Sons of Moufida) by Sami Fehri: Nasser
- 2017: Lemnara (The lighthouse) by Atef Ben Hassine: Special participation
- 2018: Ali Chouerreb (season 1) by Takeli Rabii: The narrator / The public prosecutor
- 2019:
  - Kesmat Wkhayen (Fair division) by Sami Fehri
  - Machair (Feelings) by Muhammet Gök: Mr. Kamal
- 2021: Millionaire by Muhammet Gök: Shaheen
- 2022: Baraa (Innocence) by Mourad Ben Cheikh and Sami Fehri: Salah Jawadi
- 2023: Djebel Lahmar (The Red Mountain) by Rabii Tekali: Abdelmelak Saddem
- 2024: Fallujah (season 2) by Saoussen Jemni: Mohamed

=== Theater ===
- 1966: Mourad III, text written by Habib Boulares and directed by Mohamed Driss
- 2013: Hamlet
- 2015: Dhalamouni habaybi (My beloved ones have wronged me) by Abdelaziz Meherzi
- Connais ton pays (Know your country), text written by Riadh Marzouki
- Le Juge des juges (The Judge of Judges)
- Ibrahim II
- Rose en or (Rose in gold), text by Ali Dib
- Une Femme au bain maure des hommes (A Woman in a Moorish Bath of Men) by Leila Chebbi
- Ellyl zehi (The night is bright) by Farhat Jedid
