= Kwarta (disambiguation) =

Kwarta may refer to:

- Kwarta tax, in Polish-Lithuanian Commonwealth
- Kwarta, in obsolete Polish units of measurement
- Kwarta, in Maltese units of measurement
- PS Kwarta, Indonesian football club
