= Nay El Rahi =

Lebanese journalist (born 1985/86)

- ناي الراعي
- Born: Beirut, Lebanon (prior to 1985)
- Education: Lebanese University, SOAS University of London
- Occupations: Journalist; researcher; activist; gender advocacy professional

Nay El Rahi (Arabic: ناي الراعي; born 1985 or 1986 (age 39–40) is a Lebanese journalist, researcher, activist, and gender advocacy professional from Beirut, Lebanon.

== Education ==
Rahi earned a bachelor's degree in journalism from Lebanese University and a master's degree in Global Media and Gender Studies from the School of Oriental and African Studies (London) in 2011. Her research interests included women's rights in the media, gender dynamics and sectarian politics in Lebanon.

== Career ==
In 2014 she started work as a Communication & Partnership Officer in Gender Hub at Oxfam GB and as the Communications & Partnership Officer for the Regional Gender Justice Programme in the Middle East and North Africa for Oxfam in Tunisie. And since 2015 is working in KAFA (enough) Violence & Exploitation, a feminist nongovernmental organization focusing on gender-based violence.

As a journalist, she worked in different media like Dar Al Hayat (2007-2008) as a contributing reporter, in Assafir Newspaper (2006-2013) as a contributing reporter, and in American University of Beirut as a copywriter in the Department of Communications and Strategic Planning (2012-2014). Since 2014 is working as a Contributing Writer in Al Modon electronic newspaper.

In 2014, she was an activist in the feminist collective Nasawiya and started to work the following year in Kafa (Enough) Violence & Exploitation as a Migrant Domestic Workers Programme Coordinator. And at the end of February 2016 launched with Myra el-Mir and Sandra Hassan a website named HarassTracker.org to track and document harassment in Lebanon inspirated by the launch of HarassMap in Egypt in 2010. El Rahi was one of 13 Arabs chosen by the BBC to be on their list of 100 Women. She was chosen because of her "defiance" in founding the harassment tracking web site.
