= Ahmed Nasri =

Ahmad H. Nasri is the current President of Fahd bin Sultan University.

Professor Nasri was educated at the Lebanese University (BS Mathematics, 1978) and the University of East Anglia (PhD, 1985). He was formerly a Professor at the American University of Beirut.
