= Bayna Ana wa Ana Hya =

Play by Jean Daoud

English Between Me and Me, There Was She, Bayna Ana Wa Ana Hya, (Arabic: بين أنا وأنا هي) is a play written and directed by Jean Daoud. This experimental play denounces violence against women.

== Performances ==
Bayn Ana Wa Ana Hya was prepared in Beirut by the “Laboratory of Dramaturgy, Acting And Texts”, and performed for the first time in Taher Alhaddad Center in Tunisia followed by two other performances (2005). It has also been performed in the United Arab Emirates (2006) where Saleh Ghabech, the head of the family center in Sharja at the time, considered the play to have a profound effect. Later that year (2006) it was performed in Tortosa, Spain where it was received with a standing ovation, and has been the only Arab play (up till then) to be translated and published in “Assaig de Teater” (nْ 57-58). For Women's day 2007, performances were held in Italy, one of them in the closure of a congress on women's rights. The latest performance was held in Algeria as part of the Professional Theater Festival in 2010. Bayna Ana Wa Ana Hya was also performed in Lebanon on several occasions and for a variety of groups.

== Publications and translations ==
Bayna Ana Wa Ana Hya was published in Arabic in 2005. A Catalan translation of the play took place in 2007 in "Assaig de Teater". Unpublished translations of the text into Italian, English and French were made for performance purposes.

== Translated titles ==
- Catalan: Entre jo i jo, ella
- French: Elle, entre moi et moi
