= Inaya Jaber =

Lebanese writer (1958–2021)

- عناية جابر
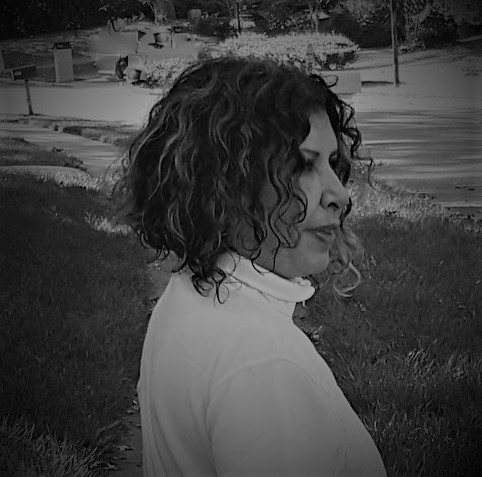
- Jaber
- Born: 1958; Bint Jbeil, Lebanon
- Died: 10 May 2021 (aged 62–63)
- Occupations: Writer, poet, journalist

Inaya Jaber (Arabic: عناية جابر; 1958 – 10 May 2021) was a Lebanese writer, journalist, artist and singer. She has published nine collections of poetry and one collection of short stories. She lived in Beirut.

== Biography ==
Jaber was born in 1958 in Bint Jbeil in southern Lebanon. She studied at the Lebanese University and at the Lebanese National Conservatory of Music. She wrote a weekly column in al-Quds al-Arabi (London) for over twenty years and was also a contributor to the Lebanese newspaper al-Safir, writing on arts and culture.

In addition to writing, she was a visual artist and singer and has performed concerts internationally including in Egypt and Italy.

Jaber has three adult children, all of whom live in the United States. She lived in Beirut.

== Selected works ==
=== Short story collection ===
- Lā ʼaḥad yuḍīʻu fī bayrūt (No one gets lost in Beirut), 2016

=== Poetry collections ===
- ʻArūḍ al-ḥadīqa (The garden's prosody), 2011
- Lā ʼaḵwāt lī (I have no sisters), 2009
- Jamīʻ ʻasbābinā (All of our reasons), 2006
- Sātān ʼabyaḍ (White satin), 2002
- Ṯumma ʼinnanī mašḡūla (Also, I'm busy), 2000
- ʻAstaʻaddu lil-ʻašāʼ (I'm getting ready for dinner), 1999
- ʼUmūr basīṭa (Simple matters), 1997
- Mizāj ḵāsir (A losing mood), 1995
- Ṭaqs al-ẓullām (Ritual of darkness), 1994
