= Jean Daoud =

Jean G. Daoud is a philosopher, poet, playwright, professor and researcher in acting, stage production and art therapy. He is the founder of the "Holistic Method" in actor training and "Play art and Creativity Therapy". He holds a degree in Cinema and Theatre Studies from University of Paris VIII, and is Professor of Drama and directing (Beaux-Arts II) and Department Head of Theatre at the Lebanese University (IBA II). He is an expert in "Creative Pedagogy" and Therapy through actor training. He is the founder of the Laboratoire de dramaturgie, d'actorat et de textes. He is the Secretary-general of "Beirut's Congress of Theater".

== The Holistic Method ==
Jean Daoud started his research in 1981 and started training in the Holistic Method he created in 1986. The Holistic Method has three main portals: actor training, creative pedagogy, and "Play, Art and Creativity Therapy."

== Acting instructor ==
He founded the "Laboratory of dramaturgy, acting and texts" at the Lebanese University (Faculty of Literature since 1986, and later at the Fine Arts Institute since 1996) in which he trains actors using the method he created and named "Sufi Method" or "Total Method". The laboratory opens its doors occasionally to the audience for an active and expérimentale interaction. He founded the Pedagogic Workshop that puts the actor training method he created at the service of a creative pedagogy. This workshop is a double workshop, one for kids Cet (1987–2001) and the other is a trainers training workshop for the teachers. He has led as well actor training workshops for professional actors, of which we suffice to name: a workshop with the FCC (French Cultural Center) in Beirut, a workshop in Sharja/UAE - May 2006.

== Cultural promoter ==
He was the promoter of the Festival of Theatre and Spectacles in 1983 (The first professional theater festival in the Arab world).

Member of jury in:

- Festival de Quamar d'or – Lebanon (three consecutive years)
- Ayyam AlSharja al Masrahya » (Theatrical Days of Sharja) – Sharja, UAE, 2005
- International Festival of University Theatre, Sultan Kabus University, Oman, March 2007.
- National Festival of Professional Theater - Algeria, 2009.
- Chairman or President of an international Arabic literary festival.

== Bibliography ==
=== Theatrical works and mise en scène ===
- Bayna Ana wa Ana Hya ("Between Me and Myself: Her"). The first performances were held in Tunisia (Cultural centre of Taher El Haddad, the cultural house of Ben Arous) in August 2005. This play was later performed in Sharja in May 2006, at the Tortosa Inter-Cultural Festival (Spain) in October 2006, and in Italy in March 2007, in Algeria 2010; in addition, several performances were given in Lebanon in 2005–2010.
- Mouakoun (Theater of Beyrouth, Lebanon, April–June 1999)
- Cérémonie d'un nombre-acteur ("Ceremony of a Number-Actor") (Saint-François Theatre, Lebanon, June 1988)
- Deathwatch (Haute surveillance) (tr. of Jean Genet's play, INBA 1981 – Paris 1981. Little theater of Beit Mery, Lebanon, May 1982.)
- La révolution des femmes ("The Revolution of Women") (Hazmieh, Lebanon, 1977)
- Advienne que pourra ("Come What Will") (Unesco Palace, Lebanon, 1972. Syr Dannieh, Kartaba and Hazmieh, 1976.)

Daoud is also the author of the plays Chito, Moi et le Curé ("Me and the Priest"), Alkirda al Zakiah ("Smart Monkies"), Baëh al Hawa ("Love Vendor") and Markab Assalaça ("The Boat of Three").

=== Arabic publications ===
- On the Essence of Theater, Beyouth, 1996. He exposes in this book his philosophy of theater and the actor.
- Al Dabh Eldimocrati ("The Democratic Hyena"), Beyrouth, 1998. (poetry)
- Al Hazayan Fi Jaçad Imra'a Kalimat (Madness in the Body of a Woman, Verbs), Beyrouth, 1998. (poetry)
- Fi Makan Al A'ard Al Maçrahi… (About the Location of Scenic Representation — In Search of an Ideal Form), Beyrouth, 2000. (research)
- Bayna Ana Wa Ana Hya ("Between Me and Myself: Her"), Beyrouth, 2006. (Play)
- "Theater in Lebanon" (Published by the Arab committee for theater, series of the Arab Theater, 2009)

=== Documentaries ===
Daoud has produced various documentaries, including:

- Documentary on Theater in Lebanon - from Phoenician Times until 1986("Le Théâtre au Liban"): A two and a half-hour documentary. (He has made a two years research to collect documents and finish the scenario and the filming of a documentary) projected to the press in 1986 (He has proven in it the Phoenician origin of Theater).
- Passing by the CNSAD (« Un laissez-passer au CNSAD ») in Paris. (A thirty-six minutes documentary about the National Conservatory of Dramatic Arts in Paris) February 1988.
- 522 short documentaries about Lebanon (documentaries on archaeology, Lebanese architecture, ecology, traditions, cultural life, politics, social issues, literature, painters, writers such as Gibran Khalil Gibran, theater professionals, special and intriguing stories...) Shown of the International Spanish speaking Télévisa, (in Mexico and other Spanish speaking countries et ).
- He is also the author, producer, and director of many radio shows in one of Lebanon'sradios for the years 1977–1978. He was the head of the programming of this radio station.

== Academic responsibilities ==
Daoud was the head of the Dean of the Fine Arts Institute at the Lebanese University (2014). He was also the head of the Theater and Cinema Department at the Fine Arts Institute of the Lebanese University for twelve years. He is a member of the board of the Lebanese University. He is the Representative of the Government in the board of the Lebanese University. He was the head of the Research Team in Arts at the Doctoral School in Letters and Human and Social Sciences.
