= Hussein Bazzi =

Lebanese academic (1987/1988–2026)

- Born: 1987 or 1988; Bourj el-Barajneh, Beirut, Lebanon
- Died: 12 March 2026 (aged 38); Hadath, Mount Lebanon, Lebanon
- Education: Pierre and Marie Curie University
- Occupation: Academic

Hussein Bazzi (1987 or 1988 – 12 March 2026) was a Lebanese academic, the director of the Faculty of Sciences at Lebanese University from 2023. He was killed in an Israeli airstrike on campus on 12 March 2026, alongside his colleague Mortada Srour, a Physics professor.

== Early life and career ==
Bazzi was born in 1987 or 1988 in Bourj el-Barajneh, a suburb of Beirut. He earned a PhD in Chemistry from Pierre and Marie Curie University in Paris, France.

He joined the faculty at Lebanese University in 2013 and he became the director of the Faculty of Sciences in 2023. According to L'Orient Today, he may have had ties to the Amal Movement.

== Death ==
Bazzi was killed in an Israeli airstrike in the courtyard of the Rafik Hariri campus of Lebanese University in Hadath, southern Beirut on 12 March 2026, alongside his colleague Mortada Srour, a Physics professor with suspected ties to Hezbollah.

The Ministry of Education and Higher Education suggested it was "a full-fledged war crime." Lebanese President Joseph Aoun called it "an assault on knowledge and humanity, and on the rights of Lebanese people to education and a secure life." It was also condemned by the International Union of Scientists as part of a "scholasticide".
