= Béja =

Béja باجة
- City
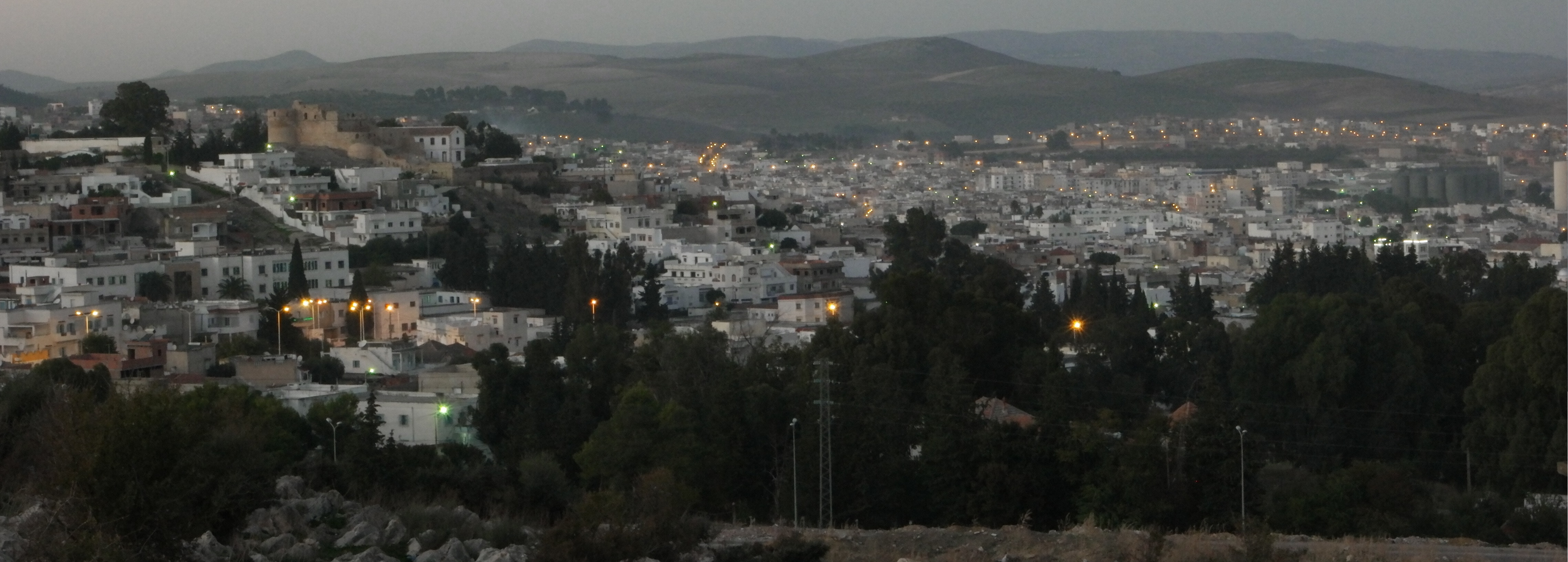
- Béja Skyline

- Seal
- Nickname: The Granary of Rome
- Location within Tunisia
- Coordinates: 36°44′N 09°11′E
- Country: Tunisia
- Governorate: Béja Governorate
- Delegation(s): Béja North, Béja South

Government
  - Mayor: Yasser Gharbi (Nidaa Tounes)

Area
  - Total: 13.05 km^{2} (5.04 sq mi)
- Elevation: 222 m (728 ft)

Population (2022)
  - Total: 88,251
- Time zone: UTC+1 (CET)
  - Summer (DST): UTC+2 (CEST)
- Website: www.commune-beja.gov.tn

Béja (Arabic: باجة Bāja) is a city in Tunisia. It is the capital of the Béja Governorate. It is located 105 kilometers (65 mi) from Tunis, between the Medjerdah River and the Mediterranean, against the foothills of the Khroumire, the town of Béja is situated on the sides of Djebel Acheb, facing the greening meadows, its white terraces and red roofs dominated by the imposing ruins of the old Roman fortress.

== History ==
=== Classical era period ===
The city endured brutal assaults by the Carthaginians, the Numidians, the Romans, and, later on, by the Vandals. The Numidian king Jugurtha made the town his governing headquarters. Originally the town was named Waga, which became Vacca and then Vaga under the Romans and eventually Baja under the Arabs and Béja under the French.

The Romans destroyed the old Carthaginian citadel and replaced it with a new one; they built fortifications that are still standing today. Under the Roman domination, Béja became prosperous and was the center of a diocese. According to Sallust, who relates the details of the Jugurthine War between Jugurtha and Quintus Caecilius Metellus Numidicus to possess Béja, Béja was the wealthiest warehouse of the kingdom and the center of intense commerce.

The city was taken and destroyed by the Vandals. The citadel and ramparts were demolished. The abandoned town remained in that state for a century until the arrival of the Byzantines. They renovated the fortress and took real pleasure in beautifying Béja.

=== Umayyad and Abbasid caliphates ===
After the Umayyad conquest of North Africa in the late 6th century and early 7th century, the city became part of the Umayyad Caliphate, and later the Abbasid Caliphate.

Al-Idrisi described Béja in the mid 12th century:

"On the way from Tabarka to Tunis, there is the city of Beja, which is a beautiful city located in a lowland area with abundant wheat and barley. It produces more and higher-quality crops than any other region in the Maghreb [..]. The city enjoys healthy air, plenty of prosperity, and a large income. The Arabs control the taxes of its region and the surrounding land. In the middle of the city, there is a spring, with stairs leading down to it, and it is from this spring that the people of the city drink. Outside the city, there is no vegetation except for some small hills and farms. Between Beja and Tabarka, there is a marhala [1-day journey] and a little more. To the north of Beja, along the salty sea, lies the city of Marsa al-Kharz, and between Beja and Marsa al-Kharz, there is a big marhala."

In the book Al-Istibsar fi 'agaib al-Amsar, written in the late 12th century, the author describes the city as:

"a great, ancient, and timeless city with ruins from the early peoples. It has a strong and ancient fortress built of massive stone, constructed with remarkable precision. [..] Situated on a brilliantly white mountain known as al-Shams (The Sun) due to its brightness, and abundant in rivers and springs. Among these springs is a great one called Ayn al-Shams (Eye of sun), located beneath the city’s wall. The city gate faces this spring and is known as Bab Ayn al-Shams. Béja is extremely inexpensive in terms of price [..] It holds great administrative importance and has many large, thriving villages. Among its villages is one known as Al-Mughayriyya, a large settlement with numerous ancient ruins, including well-preserved churches. Their construction is so precise that it appears as if they were built only yesterday. The floors are entirely paved with fine marble.

=== Modern Period ===
In 1880 France occupied Tunisia. On April 24, 1881, Béja in its turn was occupied by the column led by Logerot who had arrived from Algeria through the Kef.

=== World War II ===
On November 16, 1942, a German military delegation came to Béja to give Mayor Jean Hugon a 24-hour ultimatum to surrender the city. In response to the ultimatum the Mayor informed civil governor, Clement, who in turn sent the message to Algiers. The next day, November 17, the first British parachute battalion landed on the hills north of the city. On Thursday November 19 German planes bombed the town for the first time, as a warning. This broke the long period of peace Béja had known for many centuries. The next day, Friday November 20, Béja was heavily bombed by German airplanes for many hours, because of its key position leading to the roads of Tabarka, Mateur, Bizerte and Algeria. The town became the stage for ferocious battles between the Germans and the Allies who fiercely defended it, at the expense of severe military and civil losses. The final German assault Operation Ochsenkopf – was launched from Mateur and was halted 15 kilometres (10 mi) from Béja, on the night of February 28, 1943, by British troops.

== Geographical features ==
Located in North West Tunisia on the White Hill and crossed by the Medjerda River, the features made the city famous for its fertile soil, Béja drew all the masters of the Mediterranean. The Phoenicians set up important trading posts. Their presence is felt through numerous Punic necropolis which have been unearthed in 1887. The Carthaginians, recognizing the importance of maintaining their authority in this area, built a garrison and fortified the town. Béja was extremely desirable, not only because of its fertile soil but because of its geographic location. It was at the doorway of the mountains and it was the crossroad for Carthage and Tunis going toward Cirta and Hippone.

=== Climate ===
Béja has a hot-summer Mediterranean climate (Köppen climate classification Csa).

Climate data for Béja (1991–2020, extremes 1953–2021)
Month	Jan	Feb	Mar	Apr	May	Jun	Jul	Aug	Sep	Oct	Nov	Dec	Year
Record high °C (°F)	24.7 (76.5)	28.0 (82.4)	34.8 (94.6)	37.8 (100.0)	42.5 (108.5)	47.0 (116.6)	47.7 (117.9)	48.9 (120.0)	46.4 (115.5)	41.0 (105.8)	30.7 (87.3)	31.0 (87.8)	48.9 (120.0)
Mean daily maximum °C (°F)	15.4 (59.7)	16.1 (61.0)	19.1 (66.4)	22.5 (72.5)	27.8 (82.0)	33.0 (91.4)	36.2 (97.2)	36.7 (98.1)	31.6 (88.9)	27.1 (80.8)	20.8 (69.4)	16.4 (61.5)	25.2 (77.4)
Daily mean °C (°F)	10.2 (50.4)	10.4 (50.7)	12.6 (54.7)	15.4 (59.7)	19.7 (67.5)	24.3 (75.7)	27.5 (81.5)	28.3 (82.9)	24.6 (76.3)	20.4 (68.7)	15.1 (59.2)	11.4 (52.5)	18.3 (64.9)
Mean daily minimum °C (°F)	5.0 (41.0)	4.8 (40.6)	6.1 (43.0)	8.3 (46.9)	11.6 (52.9)	15.7 (60.3)	18.8 (65.8)	19.8 (67.6)	17.7 (63.9)	13.8 (56.8)	9.4 (48.9)	6.3 (43.3)	11.4 (52.5)
Record low °C (°F)	−4.5 (23.9)	−3.5 (25.7)	−3.0 (26.6)	−1.0 (30.2)	2.0 (35.6)	5.2 (41.4)	8.5 (47.3)	9.5 (49.1)	7.0 (44.6)	1.5 (34.7)	−0.7 (30.7)	−3.0 (26.6)	−4.5 (23.9)
Average precipitation mm (inches)	86.7 (3.41)	82.7 (3.26)	67.9 (2.67)	54.7 (2.15)	31.1 (1.22)	17.5 (0.69)	4.8 (0.19)	20.0 (0.79)	42.8 (1.69)	52.4 (2.06)	67.3 (2.65)	82.6 (3.25)	610.5 (24.04)
Average precipitation days (≥ 1.0 mm)	9.9	9.8	7.7	6.8	4.7	2.3	0.7	2.1	5.5	6.1	8.5	10.1	74.1
Average relative humidity (%)	76	73	71	67	65	61	55	53	57	65	70	77	66
Mean monthly sunshine hours	132.9	149.6	194.1	209.7	261.1	284.5	322.2	286.8	230.1	194.4	152.9	129.3	2,547.6
Source 1: Institut National de la Météorologie (humidity 1961-1990, sun 1981–2010) (Note: The Station ID for Beja is 22323111.)
Source 2: NOAA

== Administration ==
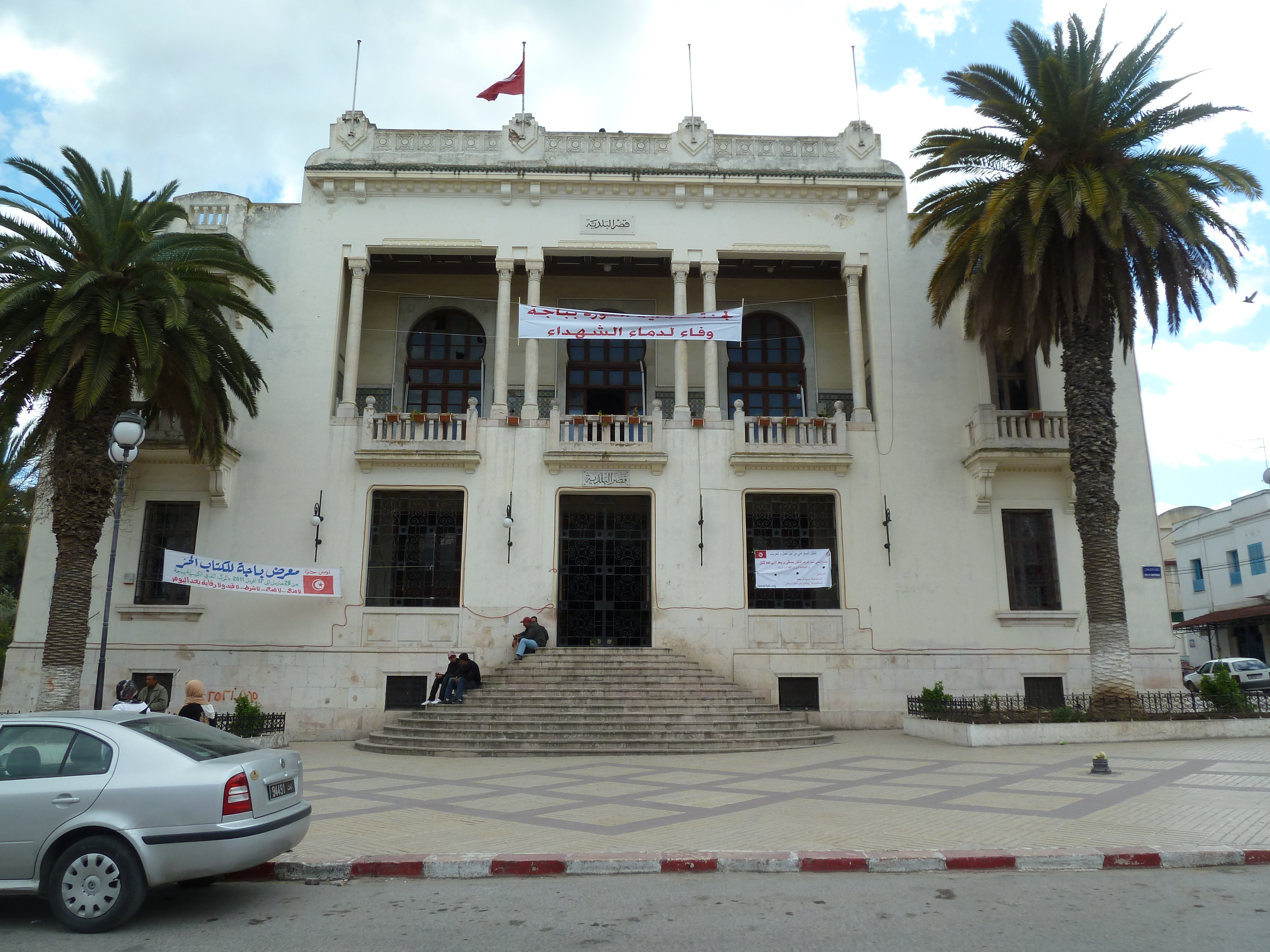
Town hall of the city

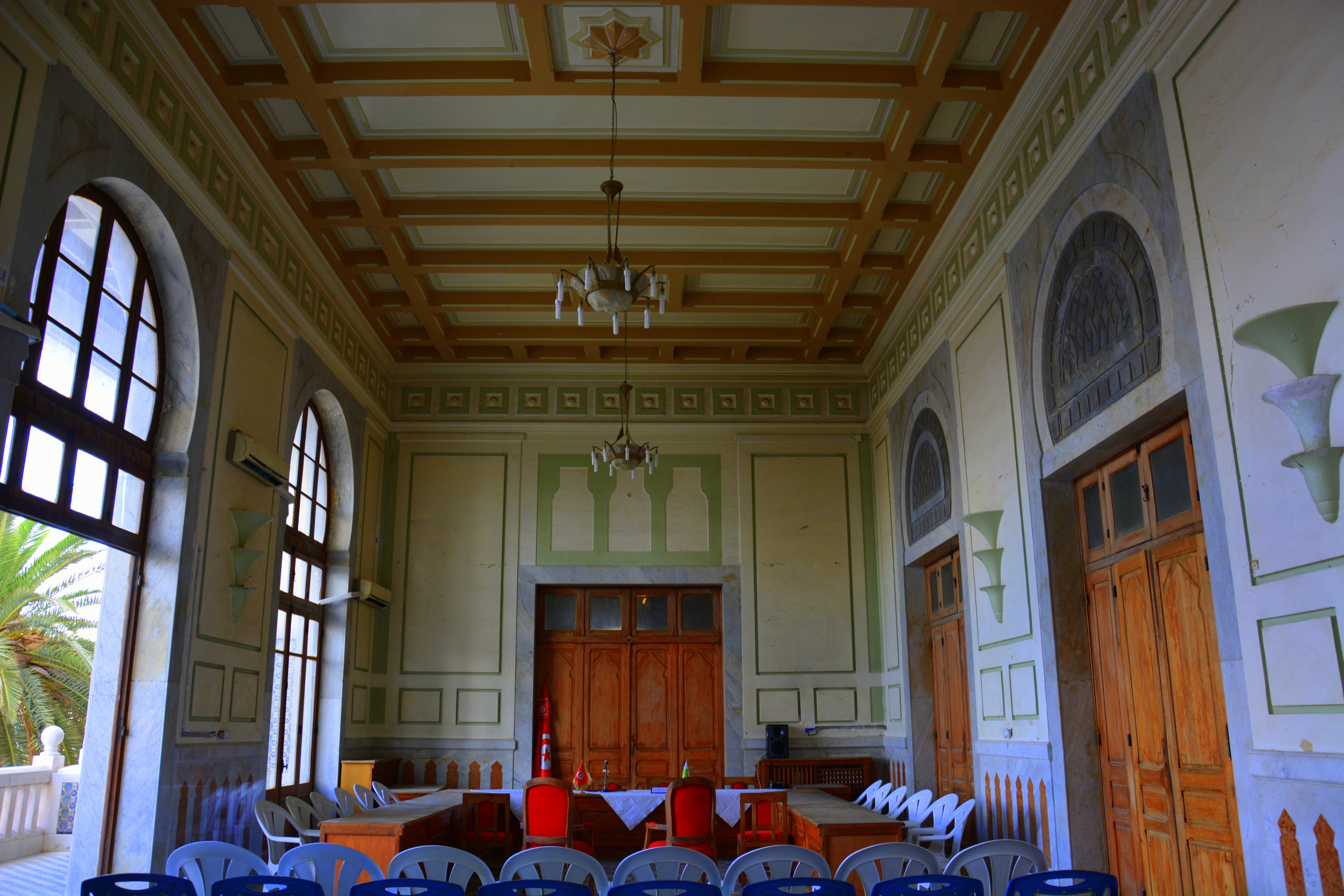
Conference room of the city hall

The Béja is the chef-lieu of the Béja Governorate. The city is since July 13, 1887, a municipality, from that day to today there were built 3 town halls, the last one was built in 1933, the building is now a classified monument.

== Religion ==
Like the rest of Tunisians, most of the Béjeans are Muslims with a small minority of irreligious. In the past there was a small community of Jews and a bigger one of Christians (most of them were European colons), but after the independence of Tunisia from France, all of them quit the city to Europe, North America and Israel. The city shelters many religion buildings like mosques, churches and synagogues. The oldest mosque of the town is Great Mosque of Béja which was built in 944 by the Fatimids on an old Christian basilica. Near it there is another mosque, the Bey's Mosque, which was built in 1675 by Murad II Bey for the Hanafi Muslims of the city. In 1685 Mohamed Bey El Mouradi added a Madrasa to the mosque.

After the settlement of the French protectorate in Tunisia, many Europeans come to the city to exploit the rich agricultural land, so to satisfy their religious demands the colonial authorities decided a church which was completed in 1883. After the increasing in number of colons in Béja, the church become too small for them, so the authorities decided to demolish it and build instead of it a bigger one, The Notre-Dame-du-Rosaire Church. After the independence of Tunisia and the migration of Christians from the country, the church become a cultural centre in Béja.

The city, an ancient bishopric, is still listed under its ancient name of Vaga as titular see by the Catholic Church.

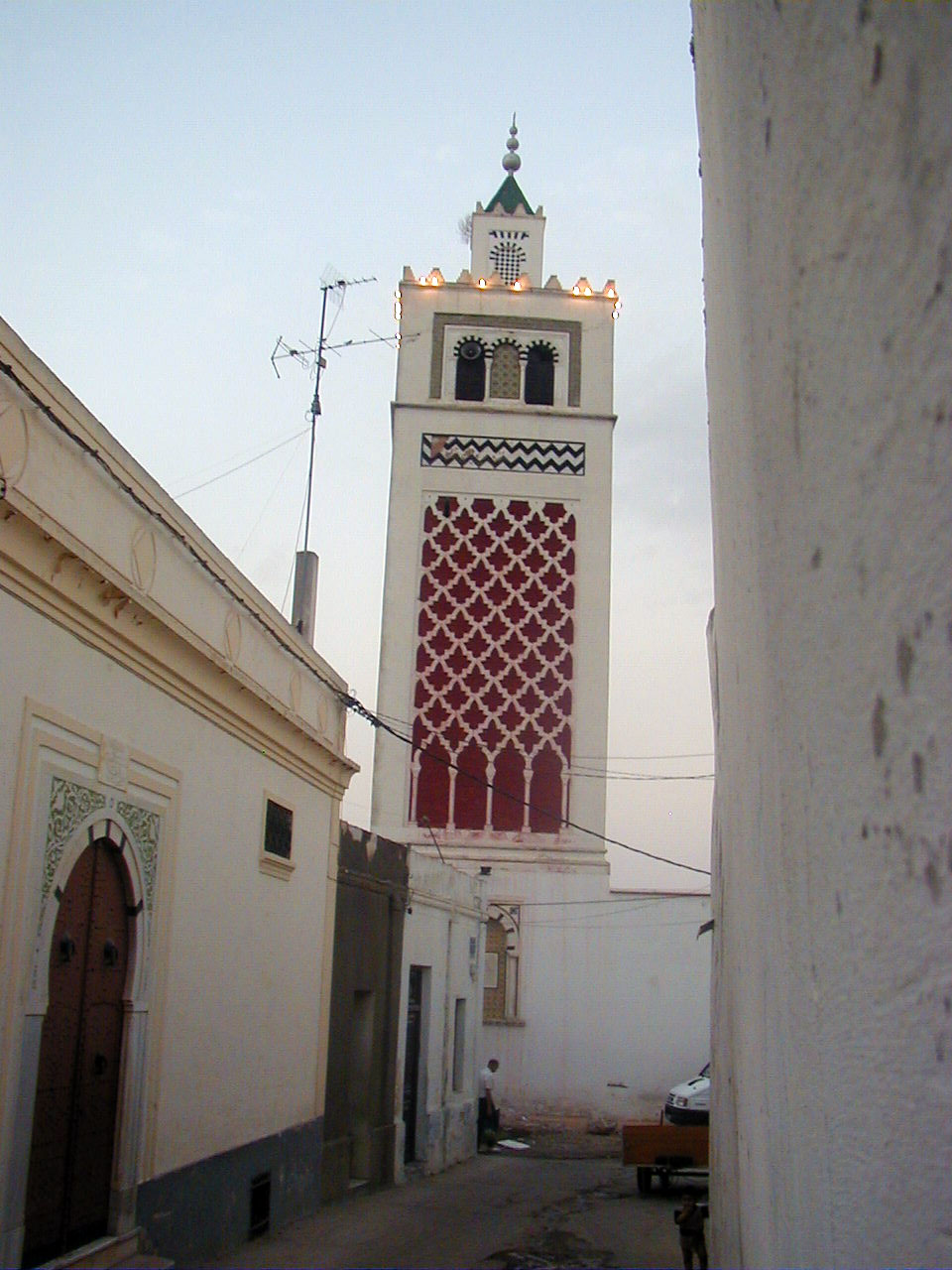
The Great Mosque of Béja

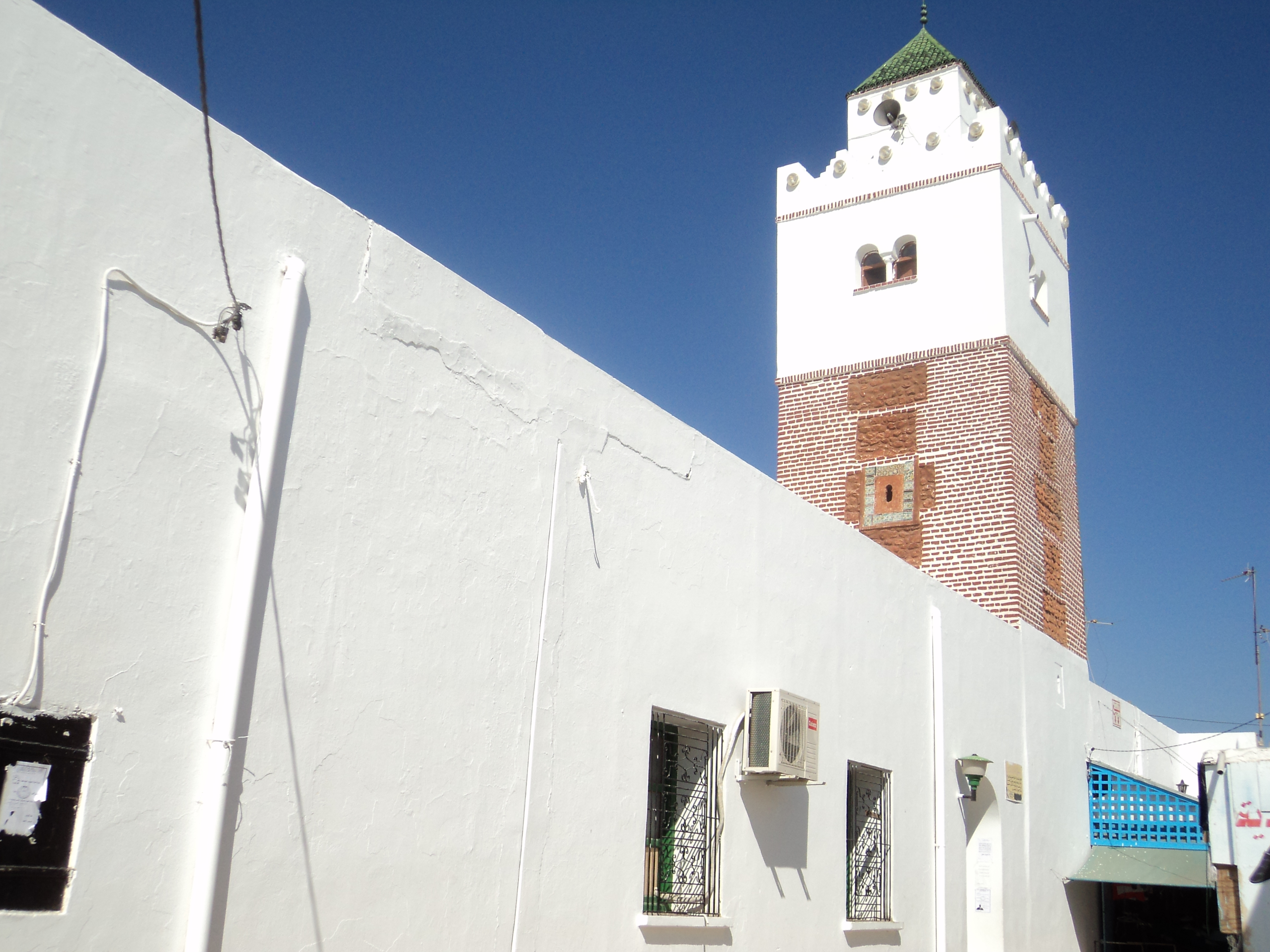
The Bey's Mosque

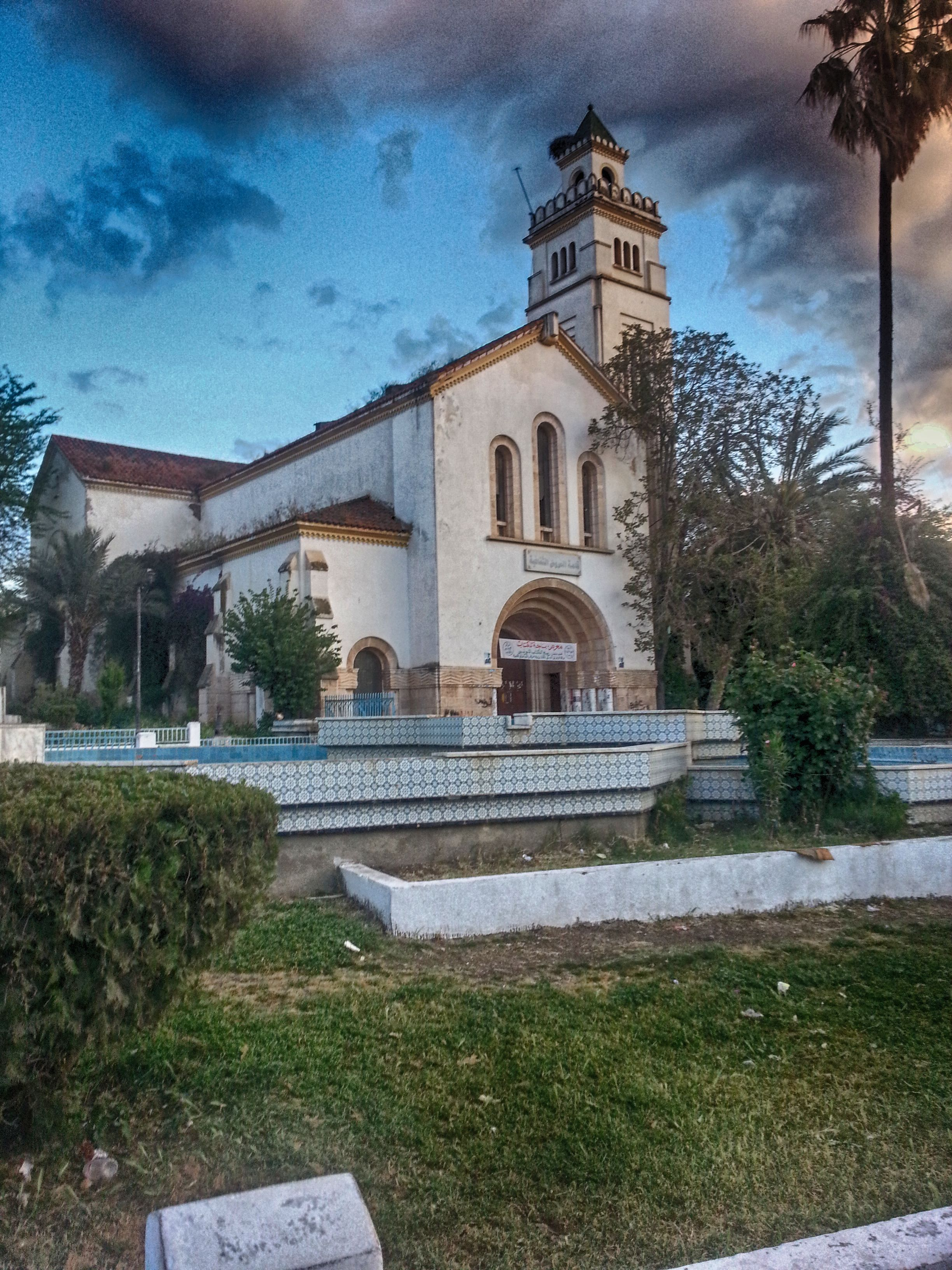
The Notre-Dame-du-Rosaire Church

== Education ==
There are 15 elementary schools, 7 preparatory schools, 6 secondary schools and 3 educational institutes in Béja.

=== Elementary schools ===
- Victor Hugo Elementary School
- Farhat Hached Elementary School
- Habib Bourguiba Avenue Elementary School
- El-Moustakbel Elementary School
- Sidi Fredj Elementary School
- El-Mahla Elementary School
- Ali El-Kalsadi Elementary School
- Ksar Bardo Elementary School
- Hay Essoker 1 Elementary School
- Hay Essoker 2 Elementary School
- El-Mzara Elementary School

=== Preparatory schools ===
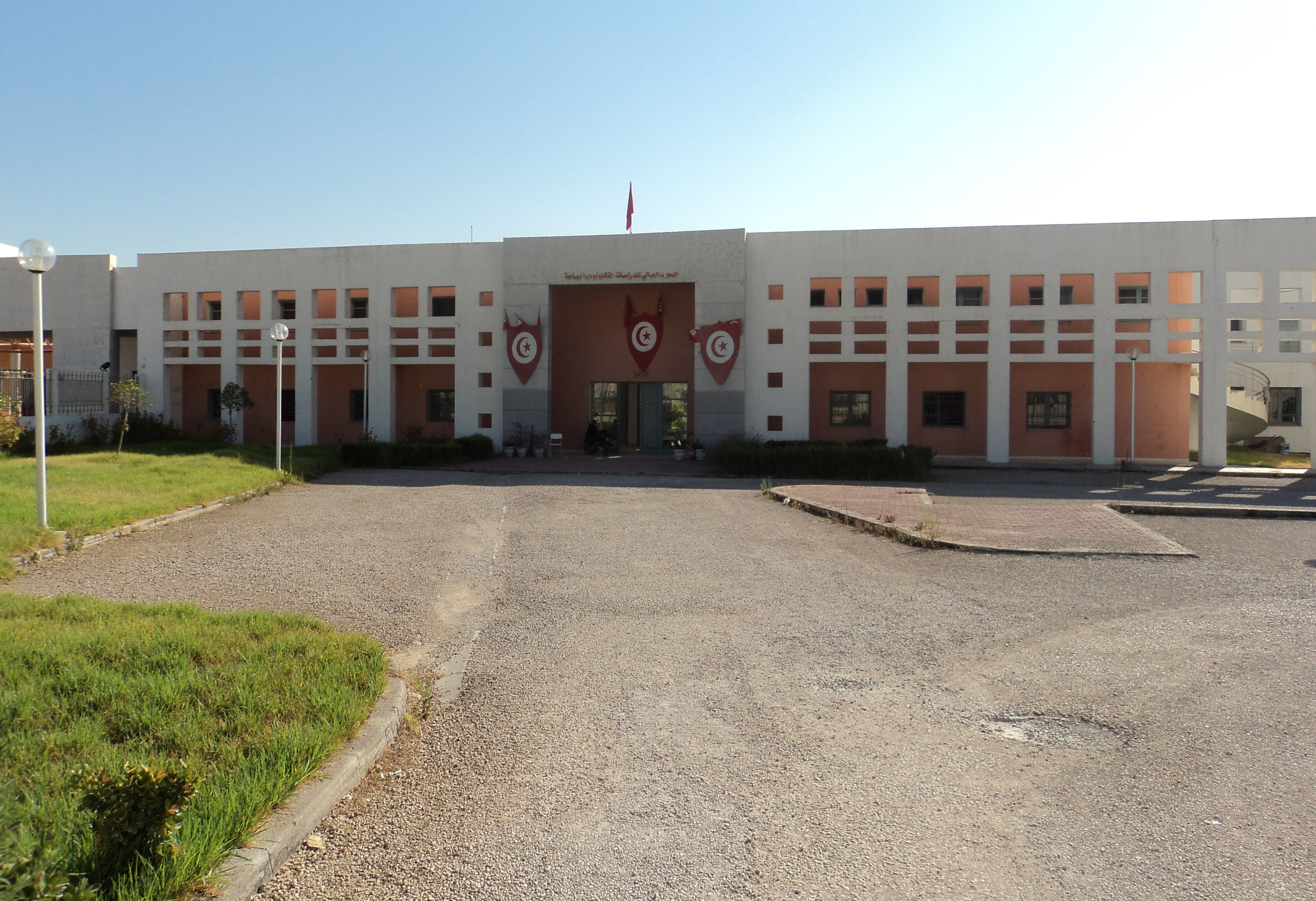
Higher Institute of Technological Studies of Béja

- Al-Iadhi Al-Beji Preparatory School
- Ali Al-Qalsadi Preparatory School
- Ibn Al-Jazar Preparatory School
- Habib Bourguiba Avenue Preparatory School
- Rached Preparatory School
- Béja Al*Moustakbel Preparatory School
- Al-Houria Preparatory School
- Ibn-Arafa Preparatory School

=== Secondary schools ===
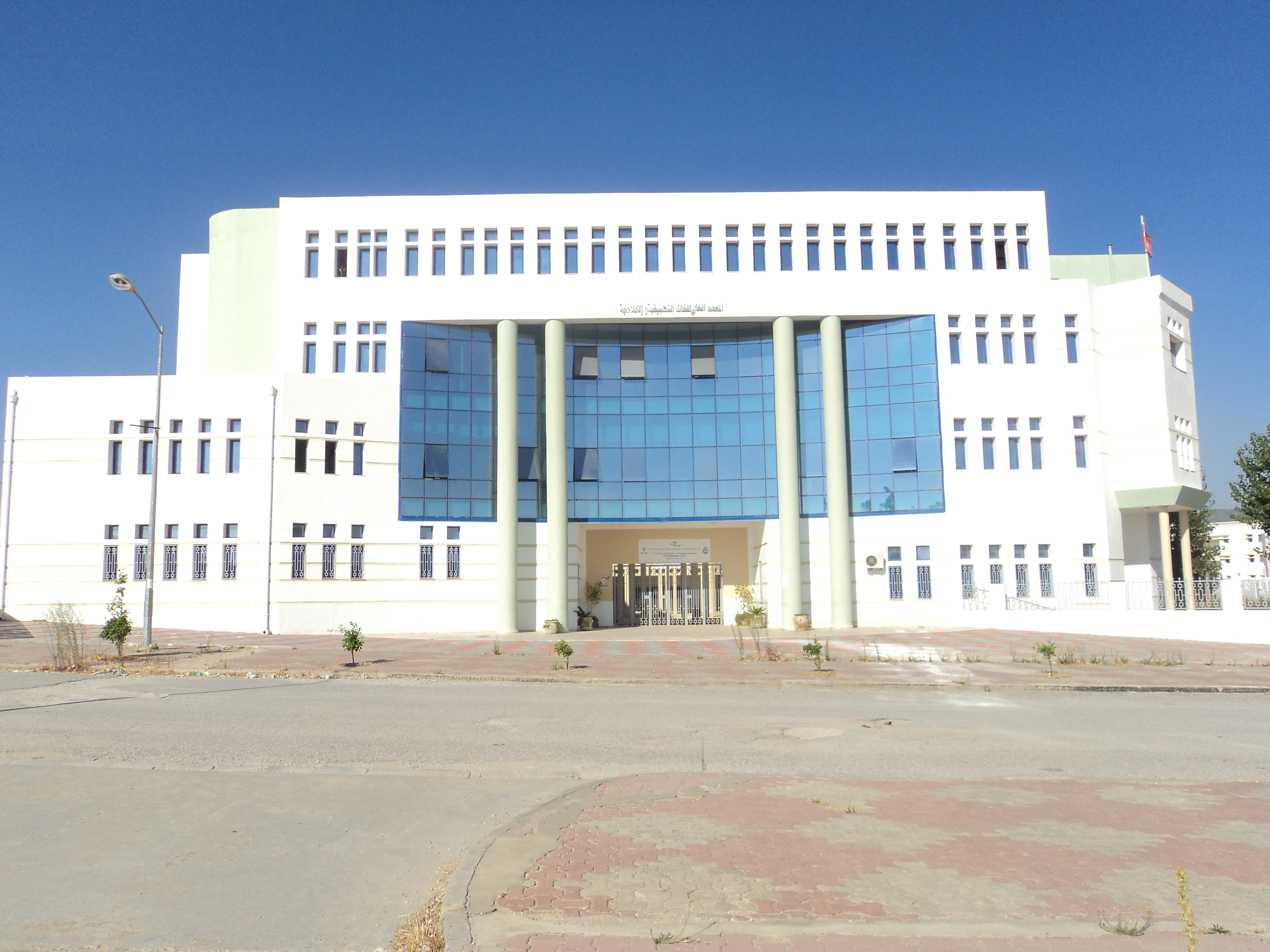
Higher Institute of Applied Languages and Computer of Béja

- Ibn Al-Haytham Secondary School
- Ibn Al-Jazzar Secondary School
- March 2, 1934, Secondary School
- Al-Biaa Secondary School
- Ali Belhouane Secondary School
- Omar El Kalchani Secondary School

=== Institutes ===
- Higher Institute of Technological Studies of Béja
- Higher Institute of Biotechnology of Béja
- Higher Institute of Applied Languages and Computer of Béja

== Historical Places ==
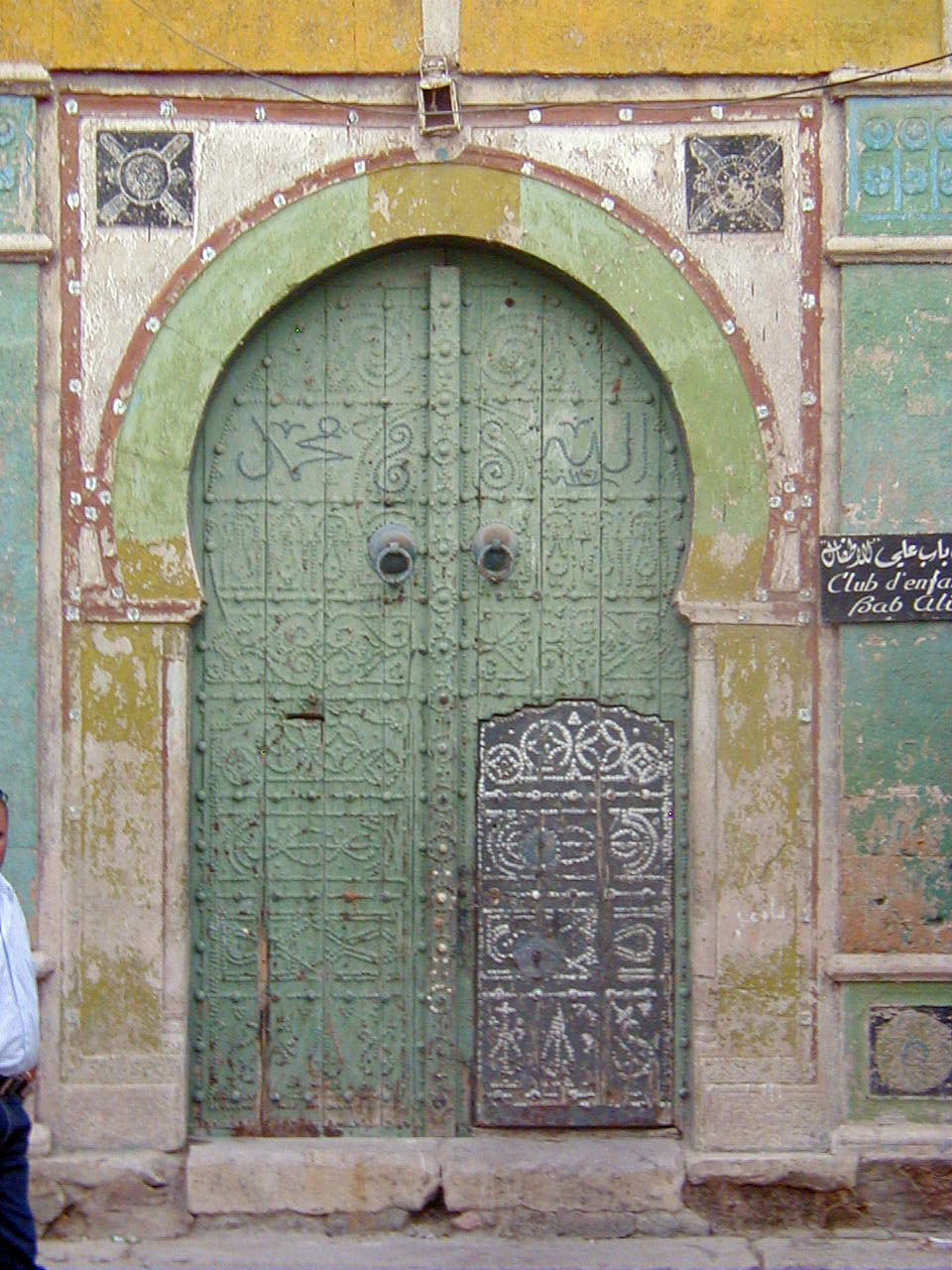
Door of the Sidi Baba Ali Smadhi Mausoleum

Kasbah of Béja : The Kasbah of Béja, is a castle built during the Roman area over the ruins of another Carthaginian castle, the Kasbah was destroyed during the Vandal invasion of Tunisia, it was lately rebuilt by the Byzantine Empire and improved and fortified through the years of the Islamic rule, the Kasbah played a major role in protecting the city from various invasion, it's located on the top of the city.
Béja Bardo Palace : Is an ancient royal residence built by the heir of the Husainid thrown Ali Pecha II in 1734 then it was renovated by Ali Pecha II. The Bardo Palace of Béja is now in ruins.
The Great Mosque of Béja : The Great Mosque of Béja is one of the oldest mosques of the country, built in 944 by the Fatimide Caliph Al-Mansur Billah in 944 on the ruins of an old Roman basilica.
Mosque Al-Jazzar is a very old mosque built by Ahmed Al-Jazzar, a Muslim ascetic, during the Aghlabib era in the 10th century.
The Hanafi Mosque : The Hanafi Mosque is a mosque built in Béja in 1675 by Murad II Bey, it's called the Hanafit mosque because it was dedicated to the Hanafi minority of the city.
Sidi Boutefeha Mausoleum : Sidi Boutefeha Mausoleum is a mausoleum built in the 17th century in memory to the young Sufi Wali Sidi Sulaymeb Al-Tamimi who was known as Boutefeha (The Father of The Appel).
Sidi Baba Ali Smadhi Mausoleum : Sidi Baba Ali Smadhi Mausoleum is mausoleum built 1666 by the Sufi Marabout Ali Smadhi. The Mausoleum played a major role during the Husainid-Pechist civil war, it's also an important cultural and political center of Béja.

The Qadiriyya Mausoleum : The Qadiriyya Mausoleum is a mausoleum belonging to the Qadiri Sufi order who was very influential in the city, the mausoleum was built in 1816 by the Sufi poet Miled Jaweni Cherif. The Qadiriyya was also known as the Nakhla Mosque.
The Khadharin Mausoleum : The Khadharin Mausoleum is another Qadiri Sufi order mausoleum built in 1780 by Ahmed Blagui.
Sidi Salah Zlaoui Mausoleum : Sidi Salah Zlaoui Mausoleum is mausoleum built in the 18th century by Salah Ibn Mohamed Zlaoui who was a very famous Sufist in Béja, the mausoleum was transformed by Jilani Zlaoui, one of Sidi Salah great-grandsons, into a mosque.
Hammam Bousandel : Hammam Bousandel, is a public bath built in the 10th century, the bath is still operative till today.
Sabil Saheb Ettabaâ : Sabil Saheb Ettabaâ is a fountain built by Grand Vizier Youssef Saheb Ettabaa in 1800.

== Notable people ==
- Amor Chouikha - A scholar in religion and a teacher in Zaytouna. Thé first in front of the owners of Muted Pasha Mosque, the author of many books and works and judge, died in 1972 in Beja.
- Mohamed Larbi Zarrouk Khaznadar – 4th Grand Vizir of Tunisia from 1815 to 1822 (born in Le Bardo but his family is from Béja)
- Ismaïl Fathali – Tunisian Army Chief of Staff
- Wassila Ben Ammar – 2sd Tunisian First Lady from 1962 to 1986
- Ammar Farhat – Famous Tunisian painter
- Slaheddine Ben Mbarek – Former Tunisian minister of National Economy, Commerce, Industry and Agriculture
- Guy Bono – Former French MEP from The Socialist Party
- Neji Jouini – Former football referee
- Mohamed Ali Yousfi – Writer and translator
- Maurice Audin – Mathematician, member of the Algerian Communist Party and an activist in the anticolonialist cause
- Rafiq Belhaj Kacem – Former minister of the Interior
- Afouène Gharbi – Footballer
- Sofiane Labidi – Sprinter
- Moïne Chaâbani – Footballer
- Mohamed Sayari – Famous Tunisian actor and theatre director
- Chaker Zouagi – Footballer

== Gallery ==
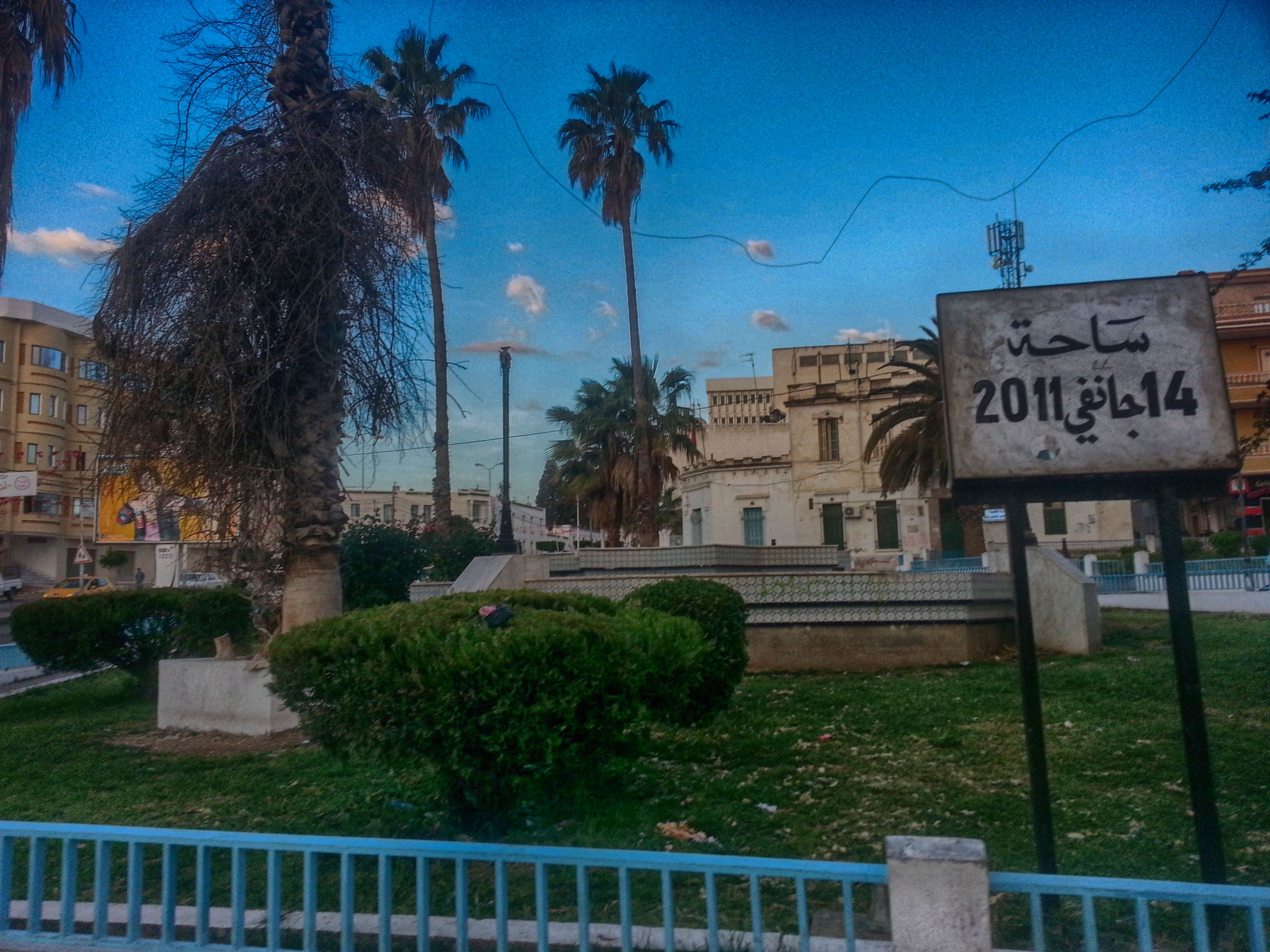

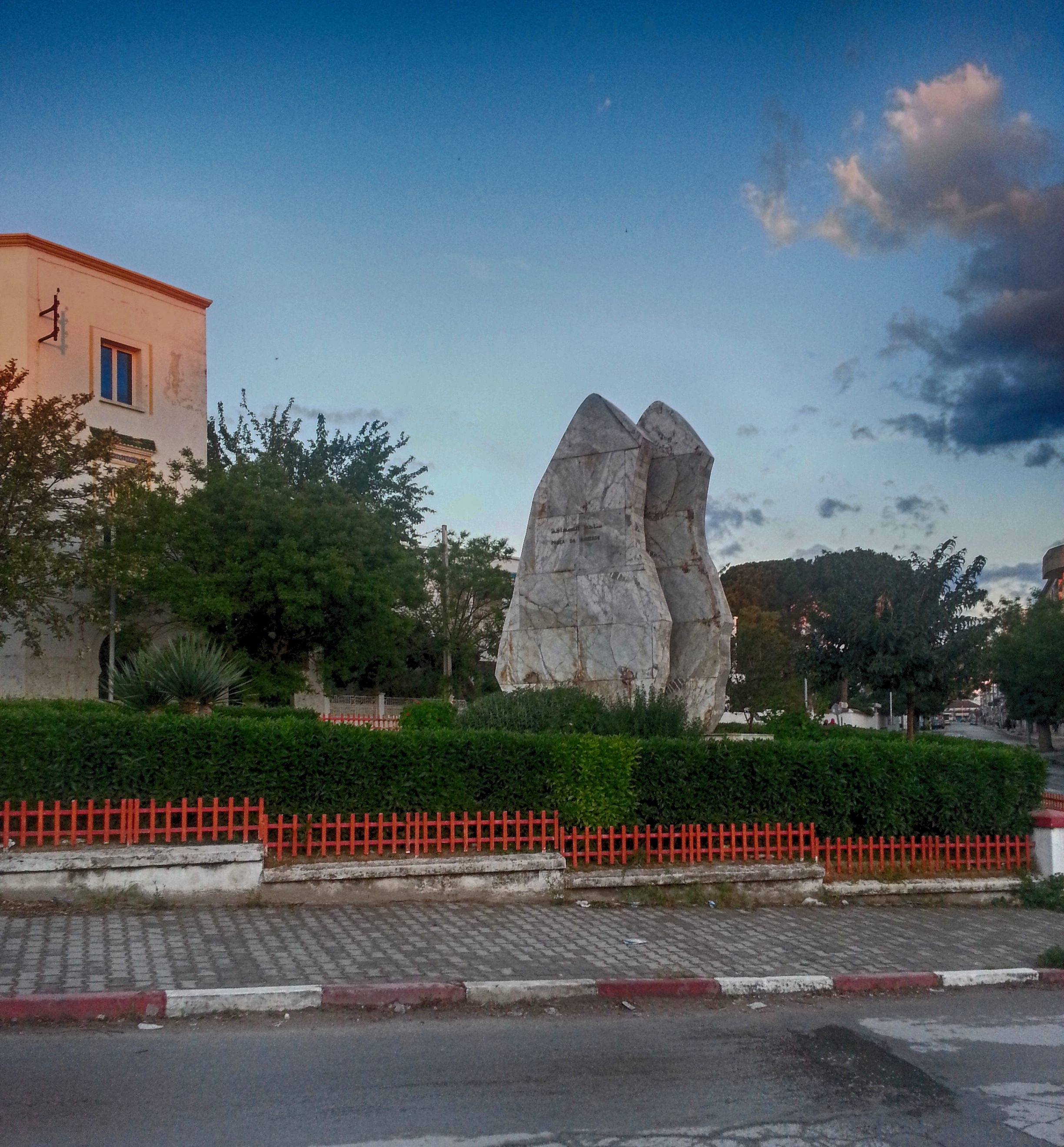

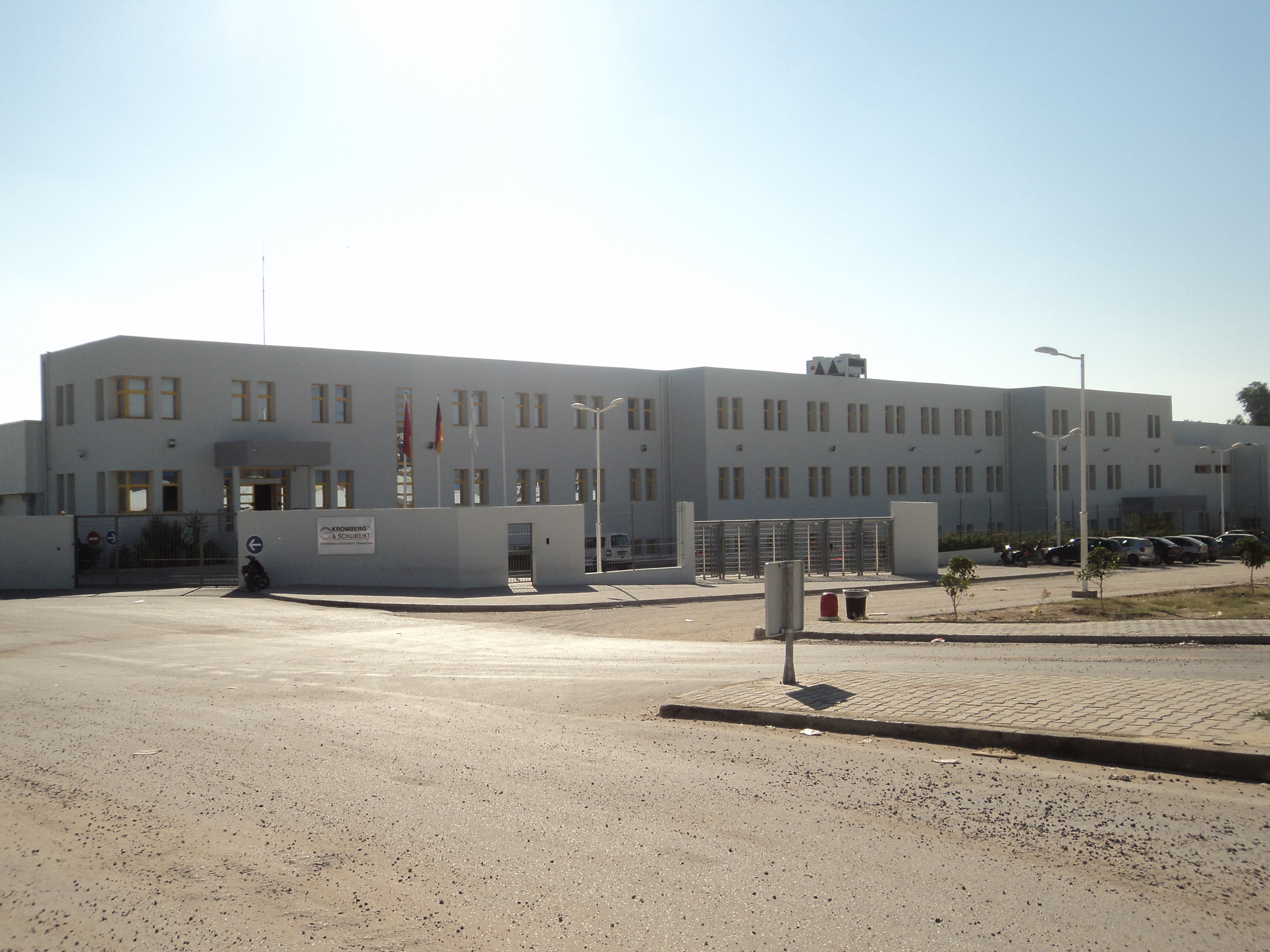

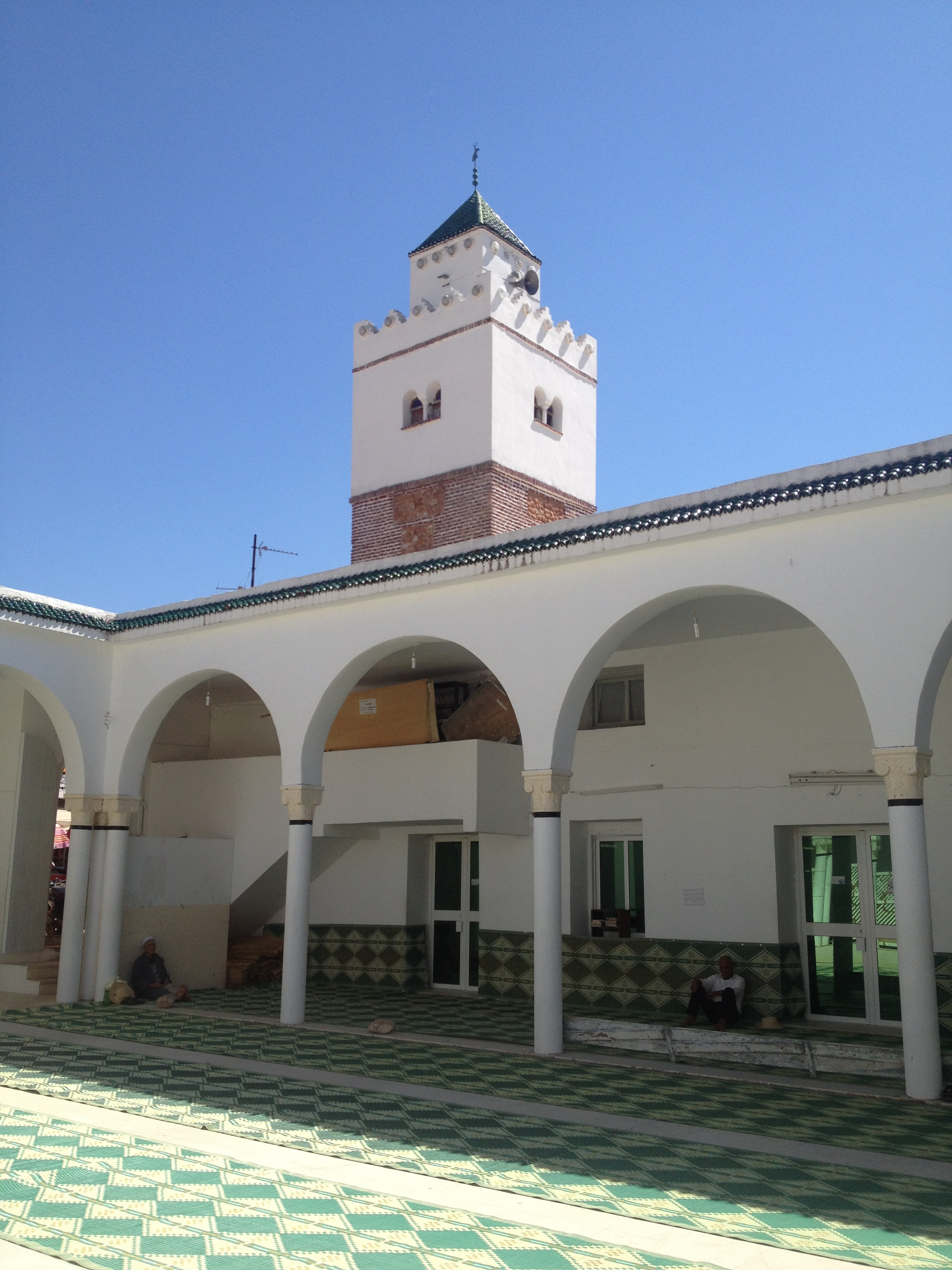

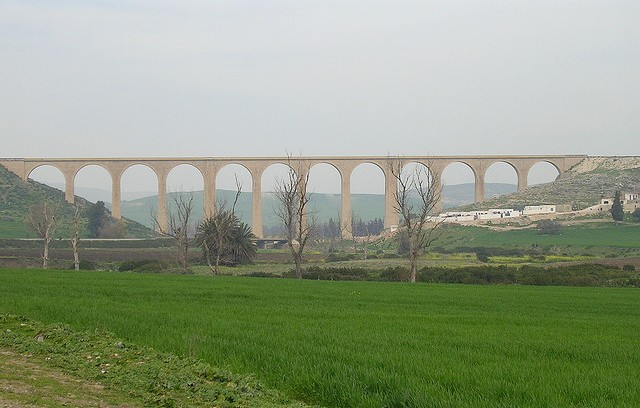

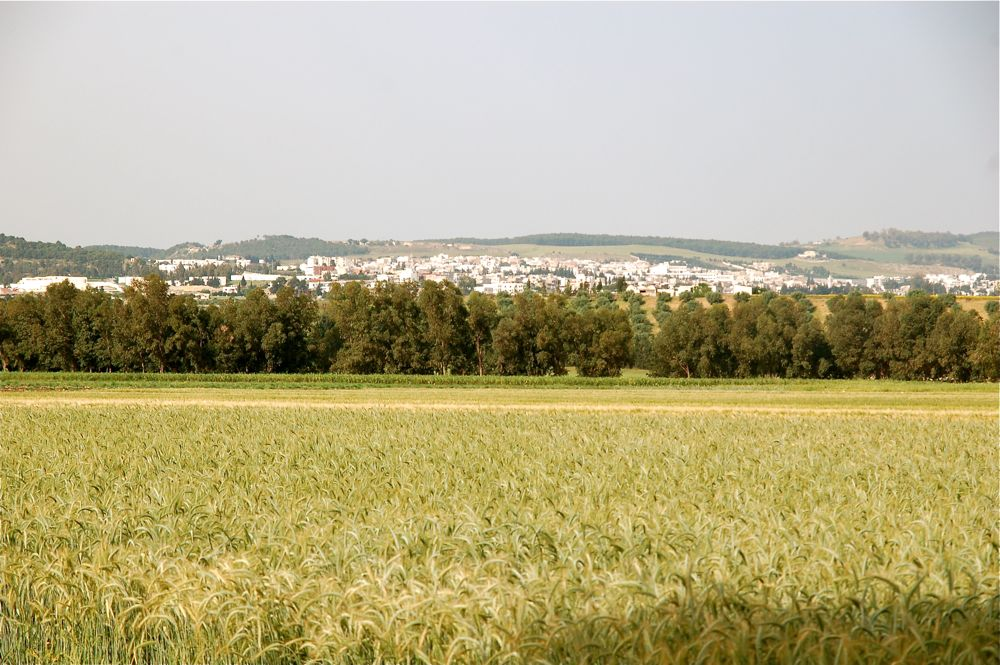

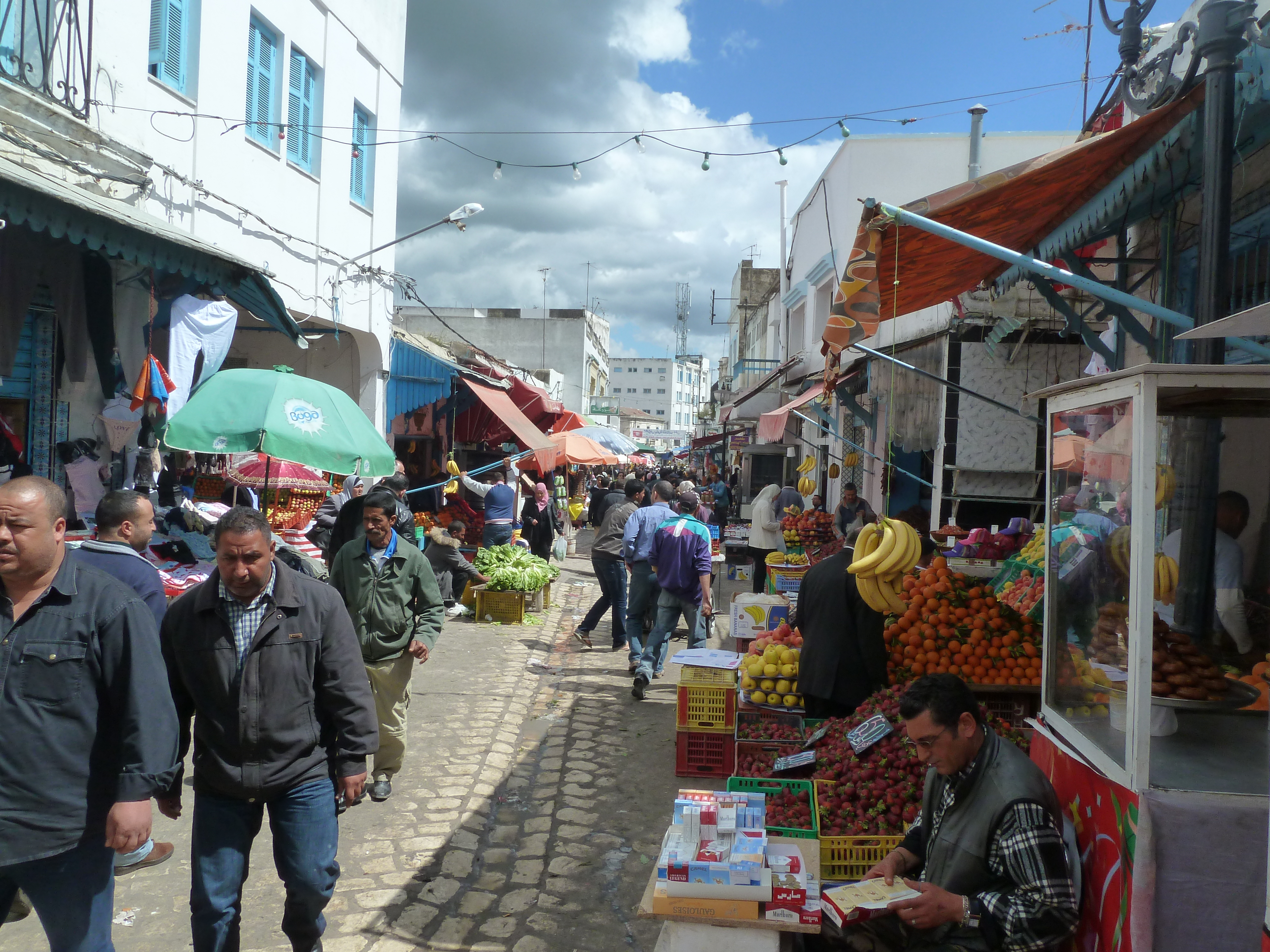

== Sister cities ==
- Beja, Portugal (1993)
- Gibellina, Italy (2012)
