= Kasaba (disambiguation) =

Kasaba means "town" in Turkish. As a proper noun it may also refer to:

- Kasaba, village in Kastamonu Province, Turkey
- Kasaba, Yavuzeli, village in Gaziantep Province, Turkey
- Kasaba (1997 film), a 1997 Turkish film directed by Nuri Bilge Ceylan
- Kasaba (2016 film), a 2016 Indian Malayalam-language film directed by Nithin Renji Panicker
- Turgutlu, also known as Kasaba, a district center in Manisa Province, Turkey

== See also ==
- Kasba (disambiguation)
