= Mohamed Ali Yousfi =

Tunisian writer and translator (born 1950)

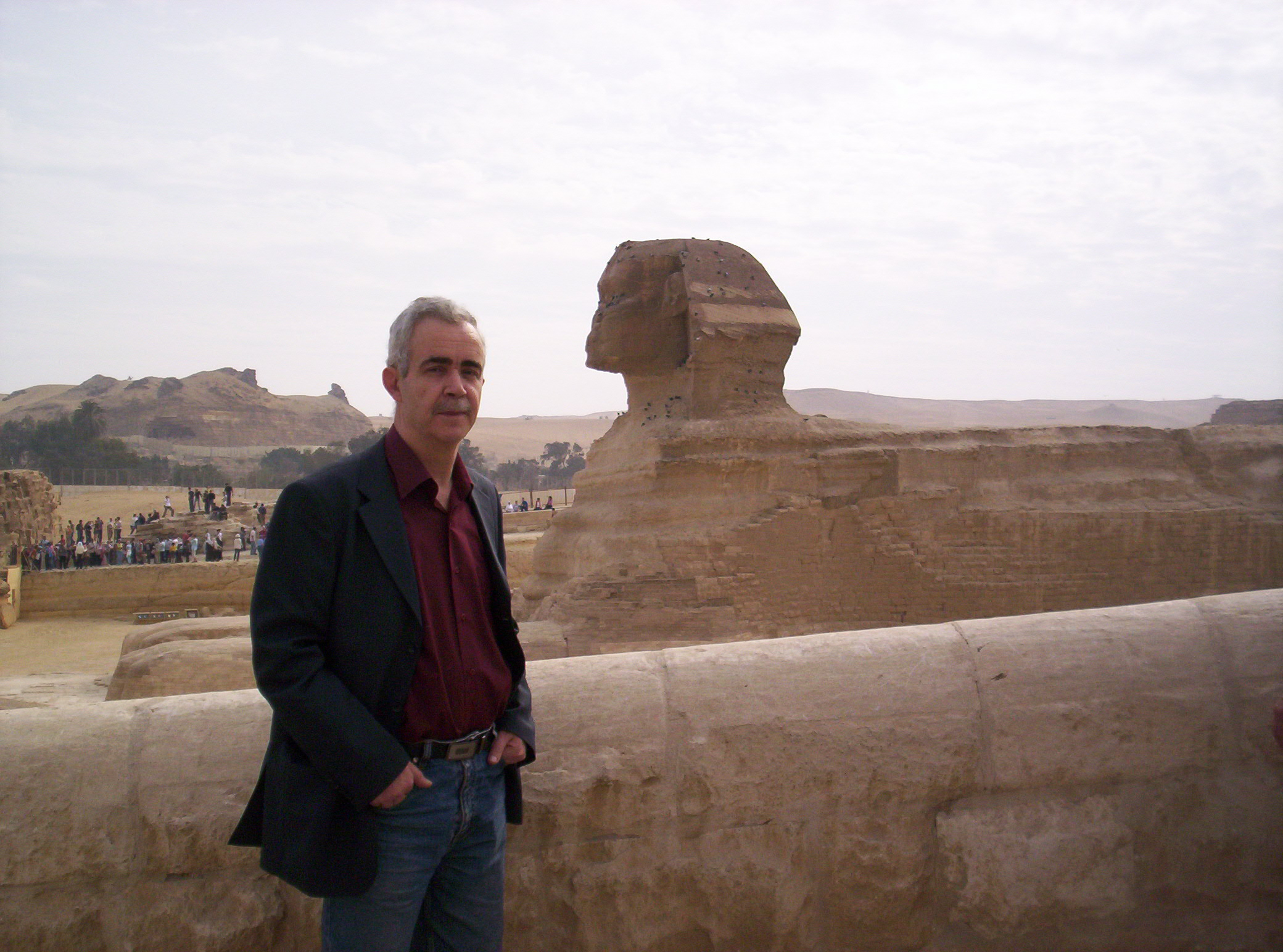
Mohamed Ali Yousfi

Mohamed Ali Yousfi (Tunisian Arabic: محمد علي اليوسفي) (born March 3, 1950, in Béja, Tunisia) is a Tunisian writer and translator.

== Life ==
After obtaining his master's degree in philosophy and social sciences, he completed his postgraduate studies at the Lebanese University.

His first novel, published in 1992, was titled The Time for Elves, and won the prize for best Arabic novel Tawkit Al Binka-Al Naked Prize. His second novel, Sun Tiles, was published five years later, and won the prize for best novel of Tunisia 1997COMAR D'OR Edition 1998.

== Publications ==
Poetry

- Edge of the earth
- The Night of ancestors
- A sixth woman for the senses

Novels

- The kingdom of al okhaydhar
- Yesterday, Beirut
- Dentella
- Thresholds of paradise

== Translations ==
- Emile Cioran, Fragments chosen
- Georges Bataille, Theory of Religion
- Dai Sijie, Balzac and the Little Chinese Seamstress
- Guy de Maupassant, From Tunis to Kairouan
- Roger Icart, The French Revolution on the Screen
- Eric Leguèbe, A Century of French Cinema
- Trails wind (choice of poems) by Pierre Emmanuel, René Char, Alain Bosquet and Eugène Guillevic

== Novels (in Arabic) ==
- Riwayet
- Atabat al janna
