= Renée Hayek =

Lebanese writer and novelist

Renée Hayek (Arabic: رينيه الحايك) is a Lebanese writer and novelist. She was born in Sarba and studied philosophy at the Lebanese University in Beirut. She has published a number of books, including short story collections and novels.

One of her short stories, "The Phone Call," has been translated and anthologised in a collection of stories by Lebanese women writers. Two of her recent novels, Prayer for the Family and A Short Life, were longlisted for the Arabic Booker Prize, in 2009 and 2011 respectively.

== Selected works ==
- Portraits of Forgetfulness (short stories)
- The Well and the Sky
- The Land of the Snows
- Days of Paris
- Prayer for the Family
- A Short Life
