= Ghada Chreim Ata =

Lebanese politician and literature professor (born 1968)

Ghada Chreim
- غاده شريم

Minister for Refugees
- In office 21 January 2020 – 10 September 2021
- Prime Minister: Hassan Diab
- Preceded by: Ghassan Atallah

Ghada Chreim Ata (Arabic: غادة شريم), born on 30 September 1968, is a Lebanese female politician and professor of French literature at the Lebanese University.

She was minister for refugees in the government of Hassan Diab between January 2020 and September 2021

== Family, studies and work ==
Ghada Chreim was born on 30 September 1968 to a Greek-Catholic family in Zahlé, Lebanon. Daughter of a poet and the writer Youssef Chreim, she began her academic studies at the Lebanese University.

Chreim obtained a doctorate in French literature in 2000. She is a professor of French literature at the Université libanaise and worked in the faculty of Letters and Human Sciences (section IV) from 2013 to 2016. At the same time, she worked as a supervising editor for the magazine Fairuz à Dar As-Sayyad.

Ghada Chreim began working for the participation of women in politics after seeing a Facebook page relating to human rights and social justice.

== Political career ==
Considered close to President Michel Aoun and his Free Patriotic Party, Aoun named her minister for refugees in the government of Hassan Diab on 21 January 2020. During her time in office, Chreim expressed hopes that the country could eventually close the Ministry of Refugees and Displaced People and replace it with a Ministry for Rural Development to help better address the issues facing displaced people (who largely live in rural areas). When Prime Minister Diab's government resigned in August 2020 following the 2020 Beirut explosion, Chreim and other cabinet ministers stayed on in a caretaker capacity until a new government was formed.
