= Bassam Badran =

Lebanese academic

- بسام بدران

President of the Lebanese University

Personal details
- Education: LU; Université libre de Bruxelles

Bassam Badran is a Lebanese academic who serves as president of the Lebanese University since October 12, 2021.
