= Ghada Owais =

Lebanese journalist for Al Jazeera (born 1977)

Ghada Karam Oueiss
- غادة كرم عويس
- Born: November 6, 1977; Beirut, Lebanon
- Education: Lebanese University
- Occupation: Journalist
- Parent(s): Karam Oueiss and Adel Ziedeh

Ghada Karam Owais, (Note: Arabic: غادة كرم عويس Ghāda Karam ‘Owais) also spelled Ghada Oueiss, is a Lebanese journalist for Al Jazeera. She was born on November 6, 1977, and attended the Lebanese University, graduating in 1999. Owais joined Al Jazeera in 2006. She speaks Arabic and English.

== Biography ==
Owais was born in Beirut to a Maronite Christian family. She holds a Bachelor’s degree in Mass Communication from the Lebanese University, majoring in Radio and Television in 1999. She worked as an anchor and field correspondent for the Lebanese ANB channel from 2004 to 2006. She received a training course with the British Broadcasting Corporation (BBC) in London in 2004 and a training course with the BBC in Beirut in 2005. She had previously worked as a broadcaster and field reporter for Al-Jadeed TV for a year. From 2001 to 2004, she was a journalist and correspondent for Al-Afkar magazine from 2000 to 2001, in addition to preparing and presenting programs for Voice of Lebanon Radio for the period from 1999-2000.

Owais joined Al-Jazeera as a news anchor on April 26, 2006. She is noted for her special coverage of several high profile news stories, including:

- The Lebanese Dialogue from Doha in May 2008
- Eye on Sudan coverage from Khartoum in June 2008
- Ghada was the first broadcaster to enter the Gaza Strip with Al-Jazeera channel after the Israeli war on Gaza, there to provide special daily coverage of the situation after the war on Gaza for nearly a month during January–February 2009
- She also presented on Al-Jazeera the Maghreb news bulletin from Rabat
- She provided special coverage for the referendum on the secession of southern Sudan from Khartoum, during which she conducted a live dialogue with Sudanese President Omar Al-Bashir in January 2011
- She covered the presidential elections in Yemen in February 2012, where she moderated a dialogue with Lieutenant General Ali Mohsen Al-Ahmar, commander of the First Armored Division, who supported the Yemeni revolution
- She conducted an interview with the Maronite Patriarch Beshara Al-Rai in the summer of 2012 and covered the visit of the Pope of the Vatican to Lebanon during the same period
- In March 2013, she presented in the field from the city of Aleppo in northern Syria, keeping pace with the second anniversary of the outbreak of the Syrian revolution.

Owais has been the target of several harassment, intimidation, and disinformation campaigns by state-sponsored actors due to her reporting, politics, gender, and her Christian faith. In 2020, images from her private smartphone were stolen in a spyware attack by foreign agents. The images were doctored to sexualize them, and disseminated to accuse her of promiscuity and prostitution. In December 2020, Owais sought legal action in a US court against a number of key international political actors, including both the crown prince of Saudi Arabia and of the United Arab Emirates for allegedly coordinating the disinformation and harassment campaigns against her.

== Awards ==
In 2013, Owais received the May Chidiac Foundation Award for “Engaged Journalism”. In 2023, Owais weas honored as a ‘World Woman Hero’ by the World Woman Foundation in Davos, for demonstrating "the personal courage and professional commitment it takes to be a leading female TV journalist in the traditionally male-dominated Middle East".
