= Ghada Jamal =

Lebanese-American abstract artist

- Born: 1955 (age 70–71); Beirut, Lebanon
- Education: Lebanese American University (BA), California State University, Long Beach (MFA)
- Known for: Abstract art

Ghada Jamal (born 1955) is an abstract artist born in Beirut, Lebanon. Jamal studied Fine Arts at the Lebanese American University (LAU), where she graduated in 1984. She then relocated to California to pursue a Master's degree from California State University in Long Beach, graduating in 1991. Jamal currently teaches art at the University of Notre Dame and at the American University of Beirut in Lebanon and resides in California, USA.

Jamal's abstract artwork depicts Middle Eastern landscapes, especially those of Lebanon throughout various political and economic eras. Her mediums include oil, acrylic, and chalk on canvas and paper. Her work varies in tone from peaceful and serene to violent and brutal, often emphasizing images and experiences of war.

Jamal's abstract art tackles diverse topics including but not limited to the devastation caused by the Lebanese civil war and the many Palestinian massacres, landscapes, city architecture, contemporary life, identity, identification and Islamic art.

Jamal's artwork has been displayed as part of both solo and group exhibitions in many galleries around the world.
