= Kasbah of Béja =

Historical citadel in Tunisia

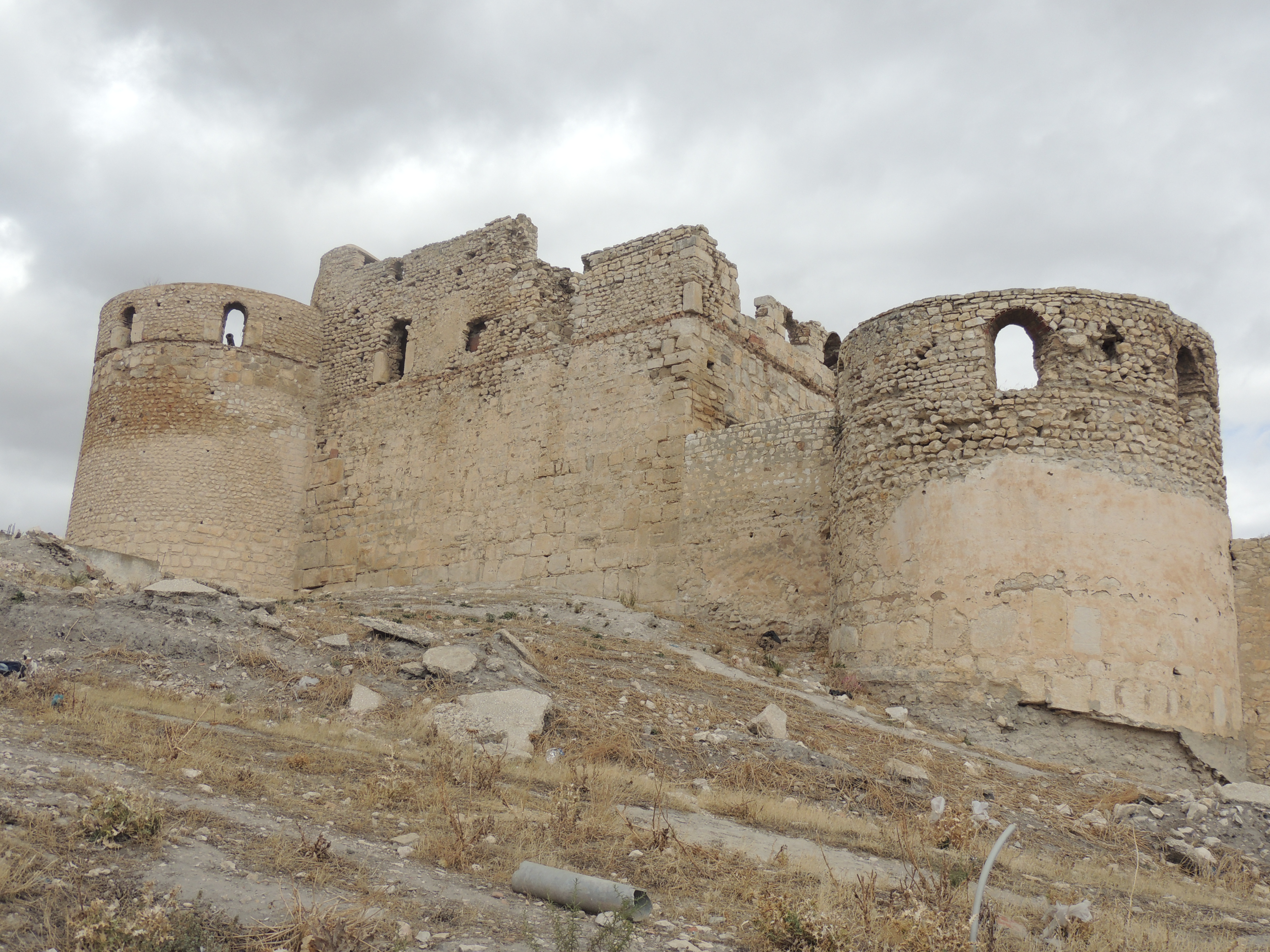
Overview

The Kasbah of Béja is a historical citadel in the Tunisian city Béja. The Kasbah was built in the 2nd century BC, and still exists today, which makes it one of oldest citadels in the region.

== Location ==
The Kasbah was built on top of a hill 305 meters tall in northern Béja, This site was chosen so the castle can overlook the city and its surrounding plains and countryside.

== History ==
=== Antiquity and Middle Ages ===
The first citadel of Béja was built in 2nd century BC by the Carthaginians. At that time, Béja was called Vaga, and was an important agriculture town. Because of that, Carthage needed to protect Vaga (especially from barbarian raids), but after the decline of the Carthaginian power, especially after the Third Punic War, the city fell under the influence of the Numidians and their king Jugurtha made the fortress his center of reign.

In 109 BC, the Romans took power over the castle and then destroyed it. In 14 BC, the Romans rebuilt the fort and improved it adding a garrison, walls, and 22 towers.

The fort was once again razed to the ground by the Vandals, during the Vandal invasion of North Africa, and the building only raised again by the Byzantines after the Vandalic War, when the Byzantine emperor Justinian I ordered Count Paulos to reconstruct the castle.

The expansion of the fort continued after the Muslim conquest of the Maghreb where the new Muslim rulers of the country gave it the name "Kasbah" and made it the official center of their representatives of the northern-region. The expansion continued during the rule of the Aghlabids. In 943 the Kasbah suffered major damage when Béja was sacked by the Kharijite rebels, led by Abu Yazid, and was restored by the Fatimid Caliph al-Mansur bi-Nasr Allah in 946.

=== Early modern and modern era ===
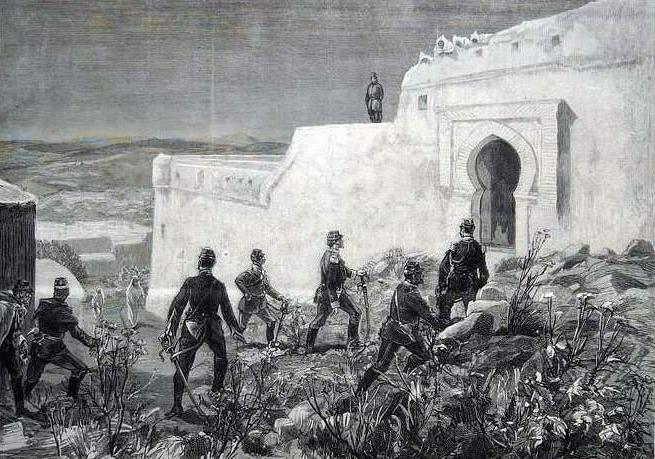
The fall of the Kasbah to the French troops

In the 16th century, during the reign of Ahmed III, the Kasbah was fortified by adding 14 canons to the fort.

The Ottomans too contributed to the expansion of the citadel by establishing a flanking tower that protected the southern parts of the Kasbah and Janissary garrison, and in 1677 the Tunisian monarch Ali I Bey supported the garrison by a battalion of 500 Spahis.

After the French occupation of Tunisia in 1881, the Kasbah become a Gendarmerie barracks from September 21, 1888, until the independence of the country in 1957.

== Current use ==
After the independence of Tunisia from France, the fortress was turned into a cultural center, but today the Kasbah is in bad conditions. Restorations started in 2005 and directed by the Tunisian National Heritage Institute, but it has stopped for lack of funding.

== Gallery ==
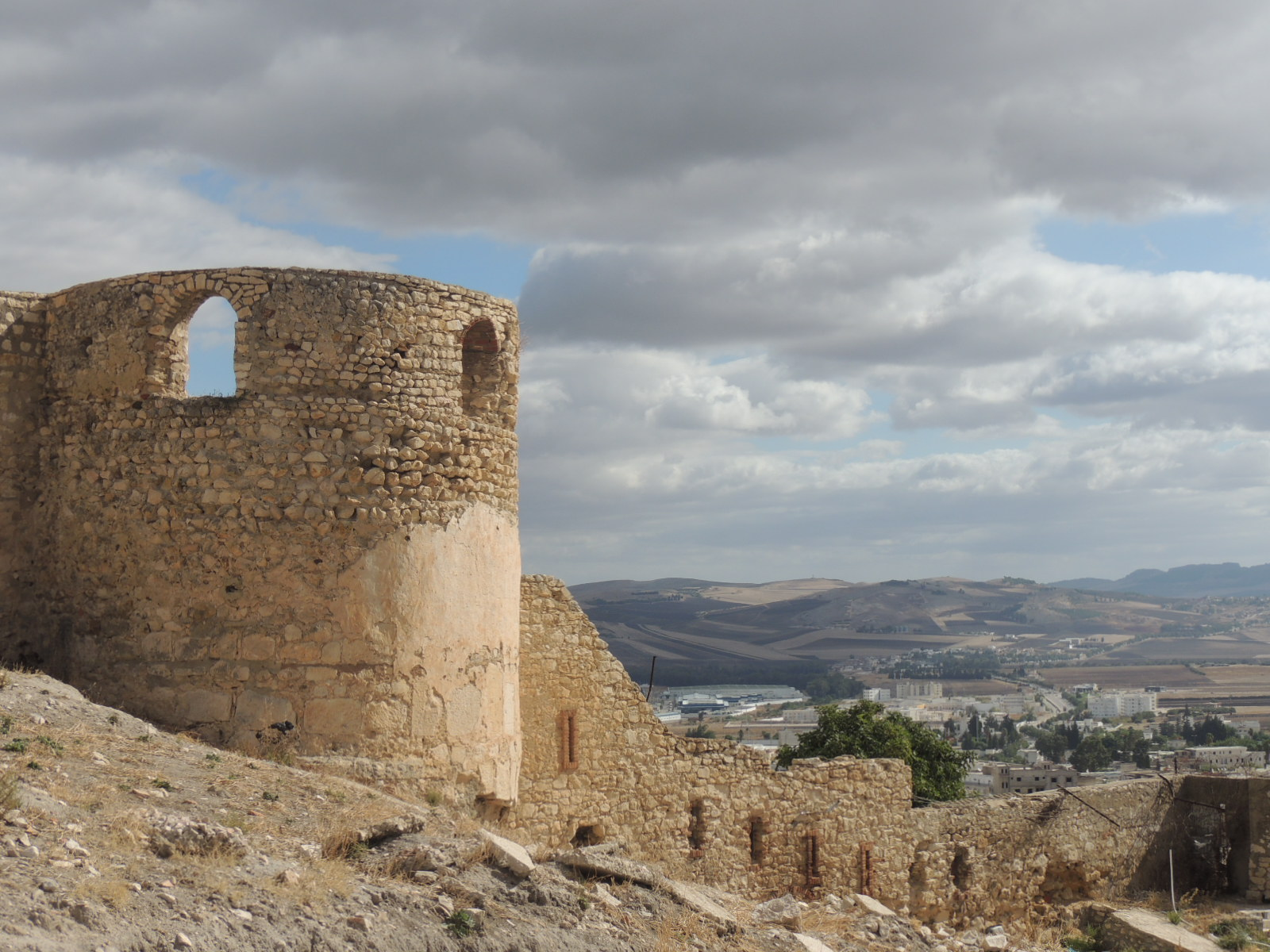

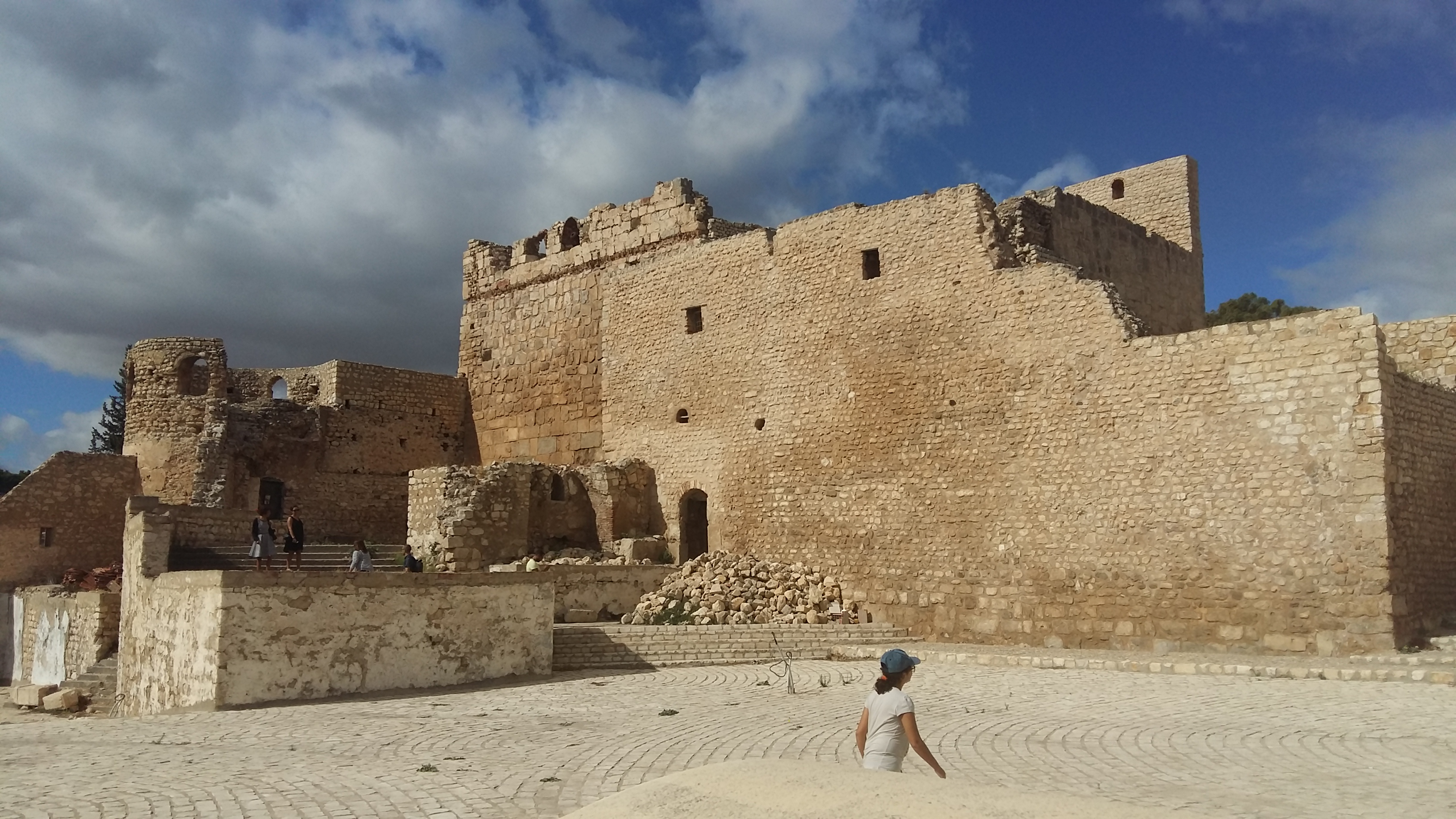

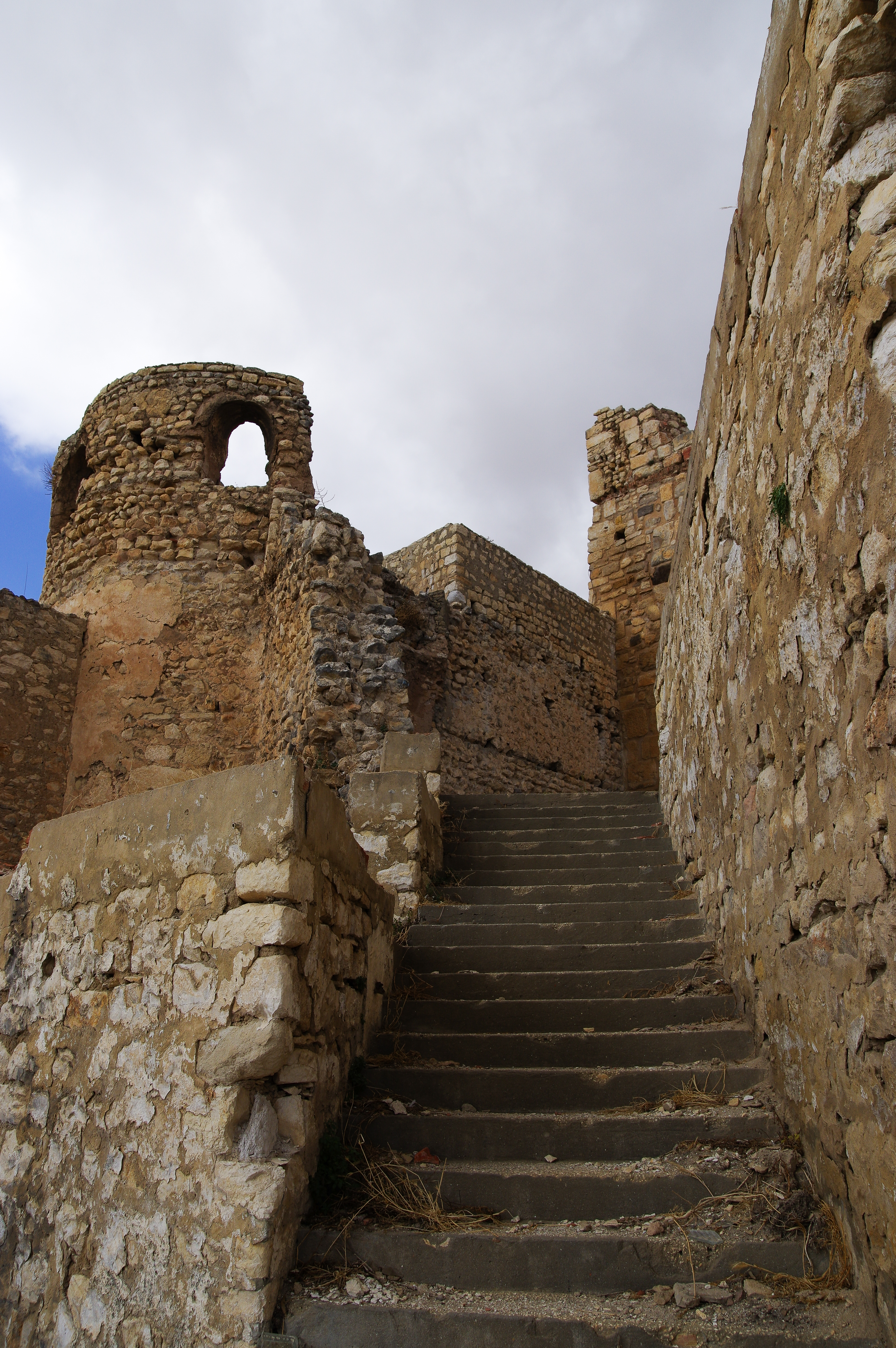

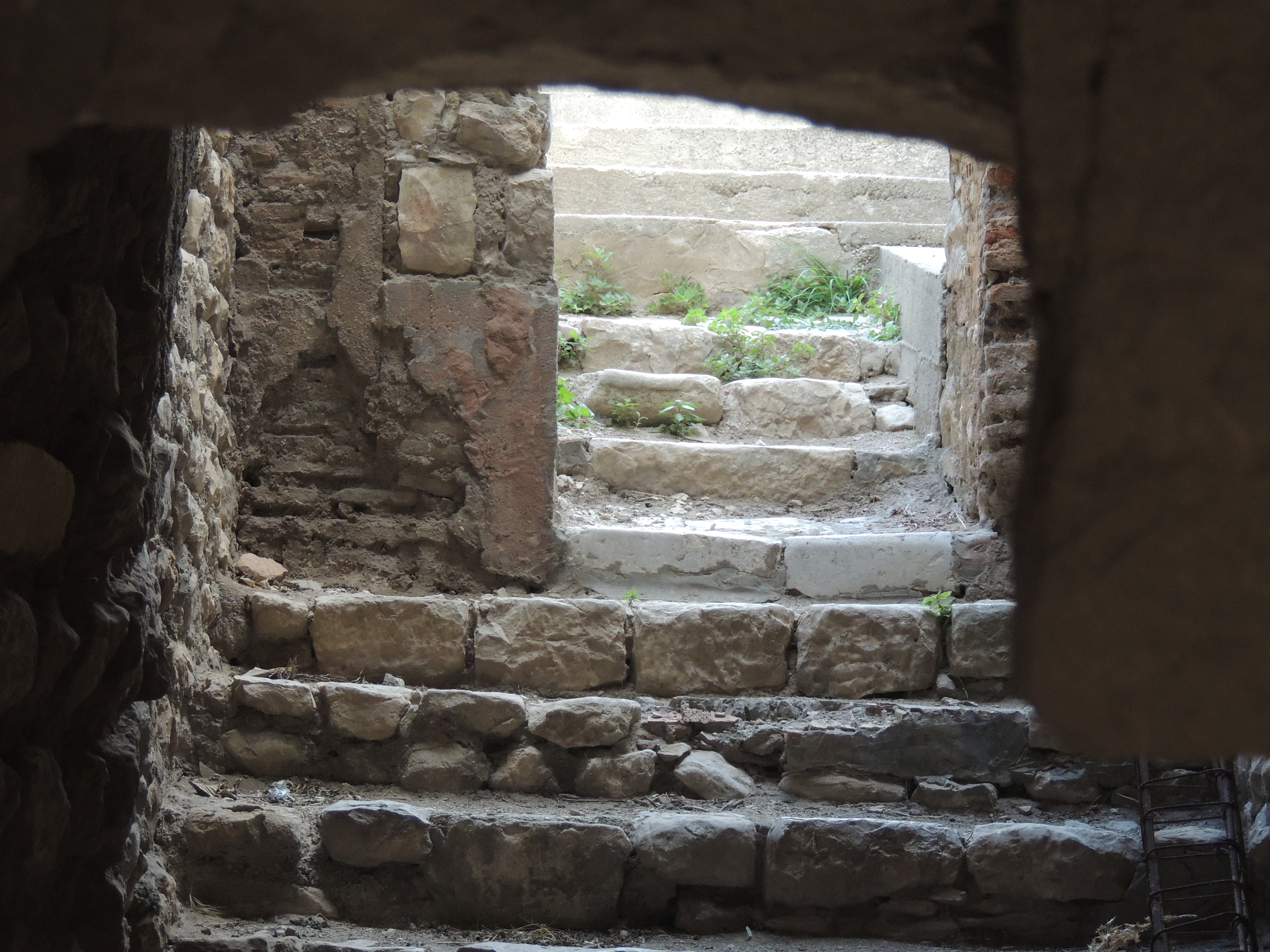

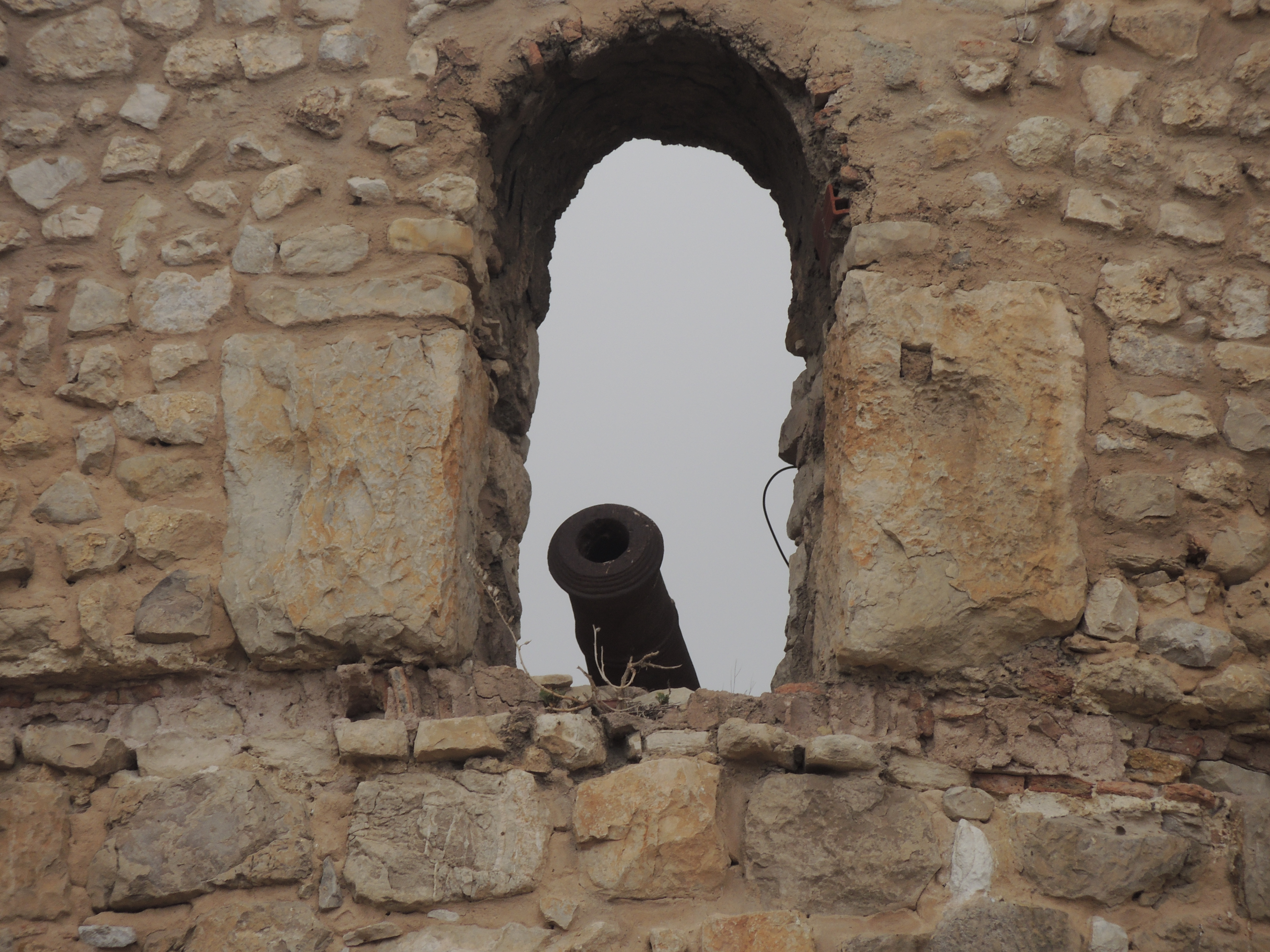
