= Kasba Peth =

Kasba Peth in the Marathi language, is mostly used in Maharashtra. Its general key term is for "locality" in English. This term is currently used in Indian cities, for example cities like Pune, Solapur, Madhavnagar, Karad, Ahmednagar, etc.
