= Lebanese University =

Public university in Beirut, Lebanon

Coordinates: 33.827815°N 35.522189°E

- الجامعة اللبنانية
- Type: Public
- Established: 3 December 1951; 74 years ago
- Endowment: 386,596,272,000 LBP (2018)
- President: Bassam Badran
- Academic staff: 5,465
- Administrative staff: 2,834
- Students: 80,874 (2018–2019)
- Location: Lebanon
- Campus: Main Campus in Hadath, Baabda District, Urban, 705,000 m^{2}
- Accreditations: Hcéres
- Colors: Red • White • Green
- Website: www.ul.edu.lb

The Lebanese University (LU; Arabic: الجامعة اللبنانية) is the only state-funded public university in Lebanon. It was established in 1951.

The university's main campus was originally located in Beirut, but a few satellite campuses were opened due to travel restrictions during the Lebanese Civil War. It has three main campuses: Rafic Hariri Campus, Fanar Campus and North Campus. The Roumieh campus, which features a faculty of engineering, is one of the satellite campuses.

The university currently enrolls thousands of students and is organized into 16 faculties. It offers a range of degree programs, include undergraduate, graduate and doctoral levels. The primary language of instruction is Arabic.

== History ==
The creation of the Lebanese University was an idea first mentioned in the speech of the former Minister of Foreign Affairs, Hamid Frangieh, during the closing ceremony of the Third UNESCO Conference in Beirut held on 11 December 1948, during which he said: "Lebanon hopes to see the creation of a Lebanese university having the spirit of UNESCO."

The establishment of the Lebanese University came as a result of a popular and student mobilization initiated on 23 January 1951 with a general strike that lasted for a long period during which, secondary and university students, mostly from Saint Joseph University participated. The movement included demonstrations and clashes with security forces that lead the Council of Ministers to meet on 5 February of the same year.

The Rafik Hariri campus in Hadath was bombed by the Israeli Air Force on March 12, 2026, killing two professors, Hussein Bazzi and Mortada Srour.

== University presidents ==
Since its inception, the Lebanese University has been headed by:

Khalil Al-Jurr	(1951–1953)
Fouad Afram al-Bustani	(1953–1970)
Edmond Naim	(1970–1976)
Boutros Dib	(1977–1980)
Georges Tohme	(1980–1988)
Michel Assi	(1988–1990 by delegation)
Hashem Haidar	(1990–1992 by commission)
Asaad Diab	(1993–2000)
Ibrahim Qubaisi	(2001–2006)
Zuhair Shukr	(2006–2011)
Adnan Al Sayed Hussein	(2011–2016)
Fouad Hussein Ayoub	(2016–2021)
Bassam Badran	2021–present

and it has been headed by Bassam Badran since 2021.

== Faculties and campuses ==
The university issued successive decrees since its inception, establishing faculties and institutes, which contributed to its expansion and development until reaching 16 faculties:

Faculty of Letters and Human Sciences
Faculty of Law and Political and Administrative Sciences
Faculty of Sciences
Institute of Social Science
Faculty of Fine Arts and Architecture
Faculty of Pedagogy (which replaced the Higher Teachers Institution)
Faculty of Information
Faculty of Economics and Business Administration
Faculty of Engineering
Faculty of Agronomy
Faculty of Public Health
Faculty of Medical Sciences
Faculty of Dental Medicine
Faculty of Pharmacy
Faculty of Tourism and Hospitality Management
Faculty of Technology, in cooperation with the Ministry of Higher Education, Research and Innovation in France

In addition to three Doctoral Schools:

Doctoral School of Literature, Humanities & Social Sciences
Doctoral School of Law, Political, Administrative and Economic Sciences
Doctoral School of Science and Technology

The university is also affiliated with the Institute of Applied Sciences and Economics (CNAM-ISAE), which operates in cooperation with CNAM in France.

== Honorary doctorates ==
The university awarded honorary doctorates to a number of heads of state and officials, including in chronological order:

The Shah of Iran, Mohammad Reza Pahlavi	(1957)
The King of Morocco, Mohammed V	(1960)
The Tunisian President, Habib Bourguiba	(1965)
The Senegalese President, Leopold Senghor	(1966)
The Emperor of Ethiopia, Haile Selassie	(1967)
The Romanian President, Nicolae Ceaușescu	(1972)
The Armenian President, Robert Kocharian	(1999)
The Iranian President, Seyed Mohammad Khatami	(2003)
The Saudi Minister of Interior, Nayef bin Abdulaziz Al Saud	(2009)
The Iranian President, Mahmoud Ahmadinejad	(2010)
Sheikh Nahayan Mabarak Al Nahayan	(2013)
The German President, Frank-Walter Steinmeier	(2018)

In 2009, the Lebanese University started awarding honorary doctorates to Lebanese personalities.

== Mission ==
The Lebanese University is the only public institution in Lebanon carrying out the functions of the public higher education with its various majors and degrees, scientific research, and continuous training.

The Lebanese University is well known for providing low-cost education to citizens; done with cheap tuition fees.

== Rankings and reputation ==
University rankings

Global – Overall
- QS World: =515 (2026)
- THE World: 1001–1200 (2023)

In the 2024 QS World University Rankings, the Lebanese University ranks 577 worldwide, a record-high after being placed 701–750 in 2021.

== Notable alumni ==
- Abdallah Al Amin, Lebanese politician and former leader of the Ba’ath party in Lebanon
- Doumouh Al Bakkar (born 1990), football referee
- Jafar al-Sadr, Iraqi diplomat
- Nabih Berri, politician
- Jean Daoud, poet, playwright, philosopher
- Houssam Diab Lebanese lawyer and Ambassador Extraordinary and Plenipotentiary to the Federal Republic of Nigeria
- Hisham Zayn Al Din, theater director and playwright
- Elissa (singer), singer and artist
- Jawad Fares, physician and scientist
- Antoine Ghanem, Lebanese politician
- Marcel Ghanem, journalist
- Rana Hamadeh, artist
- Renée Hayek, writer and novelist
- Adnan Hussein, political scientist
- Inaya Jaber (1958–2021), writer
- Omar Karami, former prime minister of Lebanon
- Ibrahim Mousawi (born 1965), journalist and Hezbollah spokesman
- Elissar Naddaf, Lebanese media executive, chairwoman of the board of directors and director-general of Télé Liban.
- Ahmed Nasri, president of Fahd bin Sultan University
- Vartine Ohanian, Lebanese politician and Minister of Youth and Sports
- Farah Omar (1998–2023), Lebanese journalist
- Ghada Owais, journalist
- Naim Qassem (born 1953), cleric and Hezbollah secretary-general
- Mohammad Raad (born 1955), Hezbollah politician
- Majida El Roumi, Lebanese-Egyptian singer
- Najat A. Saliba, chemist and politician
- Michel Suleiman, 11th president of Lebanon
- Serge Venturini (1979–1981), French poet
- Mohamed Ali Yousfi, Tunisian writer and translator
