= Maltese units of measurement =

In modern usage, metric is used almost exclusively in commercial transactions. These units are mostly historical, although they are still used in some limited contexts and in Maltese idioms and set phrases. Many of these terms are directly related to Arabic units and some to Sicilian units. The Weights and Measures Ordinance of 1921 established uniformity in the conversion of such weights and measures. All these measures were defined as simple multiples of the Imperial units then in use in Britain.

== Length ==
Length units were typically used for measuring goods and building sizes. Distances were traditionally measured in terms of travel time, which explains the lack of large-scale units.

Table of length units
Unit	Plural	Relative value	Metric value	Imperial value	Notes
pulzier	pulzieri	1/12	~2.183 cm	~0.8594 in	The Maltese inch. Exactly 55/64 imperial inches.
fitel	iftla	1/2	~13.1 cm	~5.156 in	This unit is not in the 1921 act.
xiber	xbar	1	~26.19 cm	~10.31 in	The Maltese hand span, equivalent to the foot. Exactly 10 5/16 imperial inches.
qasba	qasab, qasbiet	8	~2.096 m	~2.292 yd	This is exactly 82 1/2 inches, or 6 ft 10 1/2 in and was used in both land and sea contexts.

== Area ==
=== Land ===
In 1921, these units were redefined with respect to the British Imperial standard. These values reflect this change.

Table of area (land) units
Unit	Plural	Relative value	Metric value	Imperial value	Notes
kejla	kejliet	1/60	~18.74 m^{2}	~22.41 sq yd	
siegħ	sigħan	1/6	~187.4 m^{2}	~224.1 sq yd	
tomna	tomniet, or tmien	1	~1,124 m^{2}	~1344 sq yd	exactly 5/18 acre, or 12,100 square feet. This unit is also exactly 256 qasba kwadru. Sometimes called a tumolo in English texts. Also called Tumoli with modern real estate agents Cf. dunam.
wejba	wejbiet	4	~4497 m^{2}	~1.111 acres	exactly 1 1/9 acres.
modd	mdied	16	~1.799 ha	~4.444 acres	exactly 4 4/9 acres

=== Square ===
Table of area (square) units
Unit	Plural	Relative value	Metric value	Imperial value	Notes
pulzier kwadru	pulzieri kwadri	1/144	~4.765 cm^{2}	~0.7385 sq in	
fitel kwadru	iftla kwadri	1/4	~171.5 cm^{2}	~26.59 sq in	
xiber kwadru	xbar kwadri	1	~686.1 cm^{2}	~106.3 sq in	
qasba kwadra	qasab kwadri, or qasbiet kwadri	64	~4.391 m^{2}	~5.252 sq yd	an area 1 qasba by 1 qasba

== Volume ==
These units were all (except for the cubic units) defined in 1921 relative to the British Imperial gallon, which was defined in the 1824 act. This is equal to 10 pounds of water at a specified temperature and air pressure. This (~4.54609031 litres) is slightly larger than the modern definition (exactly 4.54609 litres).

=== Beer, wine, and spirits measure ===
None of the units from this group are mentioned in TY Maltese.

Table of volume (beer, wine, & spirits) units
Unit	Plural	Relative value	Metric value	Imperial value	Notes
pinta	pinet	1/8	~142.1 ml	1/4 pt	
terz	terzi	1/4	~284.1 ml	1/2 pt	'third'
nofs	infas	1/2	~568.3 ml	1 pt	'half'
kartoċċ	krateċ	1	~1.137 litres	2 pt	
kwarta	kwarti	4 3/4	~5.398 L	9 1/2 pt	'quarter'
ġarra	ġarar	9 1/2	~10.8 L	2 3/8 gal	
barmil	bramel	38	~43.19 L	9 1/2 gal	'barrel'

=== Milk and Oil measure ===
Table of volume (milk & oil) units
Unit	Plural	Relative value	Metric value	Imperial value	Notes
kwartin	kwartini	1/40	~31.96 ml	1 1/8 fl oz	'quarter'. Referenced in 1921 Act only.
kejla	kejliet	1/10	~127.9 ml	4 1/2 fl oz	'measure' Referenced in 1921 Act only.
terz	terzi	1/4	~319.6 ml	11 1/4 fl oz	'third'
nofs	infas	1/2	~639.3 ml	22 1/2 fl oz, or 1 1/8 pints	'half'
kartoċċ	krateċ	1	~1.279 litres	2 1/4 pt	
kwarta	kwarti	4	~5.114 L	9 pt, or 1 1/8 gal	'quarter'
qafiż	qofża	16	~20.46 L	4 1/2 gal	Referenced in 1921 Act only.

=== Dry ===
None of these units are mentioned in TY Maltese. Note that there are two conflicting values for the siegħ (1/10 and 1/6 tomna, respectively).

Table of volume (dry) units
Unit	Plural	Relative value	Metric value	Imperial value	Notes
lumin	lumini	1/600	~30.31 ml	~1.849 cu in	
kejla	kejliet	1/60	~303.1 ml	~18.49 cu in	also called a mondell
siegħ	sigħan	1/10	~1.818 L	~111 cu in	This is the value listed for the siegħ by Aquilina. The 1921 Act has a different value. This amount is exactly 3 1/5 imperial pints.
għabara		1/6	~3.031 L	~184.9 cu in, or ~0.107 cu ft	Referenced in Aquilina only. The 1921 Act uses this value for the siegħ, and does not mention the għabara by name.
tomna	tmien, or tomniet	1	~18.18 L	~0.6422 cu ft	Sometimes called the tumolo in English texts. This is exactly 4 imperial gallons.
modd	mdied	16	~290.9 L	~10.27 cu ft, or ~0.3805 cu yd	'weigh'. An alternate name given by Aquilina is the salma. This is exactly 64 imperial gallons.

=== Cubic ===
Table of volume (cubic) units
Unit	Plural	Relative value	Metric value	Imperial value	Notes
pulzier kubu	pulzieri kubi	1/1728	~10.4 ml	~0.6347 cu in	
fitel kubu	iftla kubi	1/8	~2.246 L	~137.1 cu in	
xiber kubu	xbar kubi	1	~17.97 L	~1097 cu in	
qasba kubu	qasab kubi, or qasbiet kubi	512	~9.202 kl	~12.04 cu yd	a volume 1 qasba by 1 qasba by 1 qasba

== Mass ==
All the Maltese mass units were redefined relative to the British Imperial ton in 1921. Before this, the units were presumably based on an Arabic standard. All equivalent measures listed in pounds below are exact values.

Note: there are two distinct units which are named kwart.

Table of mass units
Unit	Plural	Relative value	Metric value	Imperial value	Notes
ottav	ottavi	1/8 uqija	~3.307 g	7/60 oz	'eighth'. Referenced in 1921 Act only.
kwart	kwarti	1/4 uqija	~6.615 g	7/30 oz	'quarter'. Referenced in 1921 Act only.
uqija	ewieq	1/30	~26.46 g	14/15 oz	The Maltese ounce.
kwart	kwarti	1/4	~198.4 g	7 oz	'quarter'. Referenced in Aquilina only.
ratal	irtal	1	~793.8 g	28 oz, or 1 3/4 lb	Sometimes called a rotola in English texts.
qsima	qsimiet	1 1/4	~992.2 g	35 oz, or 2 3/16 lb	Referenced in Aquilina only.
wiżna	wiżniet	5	~3.969 kg	8 3/4 lb	Referenced in Aquilina and TY Maltese. Not mentioned in 1921 Act.
qantar	qnatar	100	~79.38 kg	175 lb	
peżata		300	~238.1 kg	525 lb	Referenced in 1921 Act only.

== Money ==
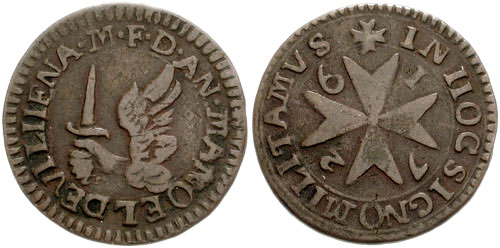
Grano coin of 1726

This system was used during the rule of the Knights of St. John in Malta. Subsequent currencies in use were sterling and the Maltese pound. Malta has since adopted the euro.

Table of money units
Unit	Plural	Relative value	Notes
grano	grani	1	
taro	tari	20	
scudo	scudi	240	
