= Ancient Arabic units of measurement =

System of measurement used in Ancient Arab world

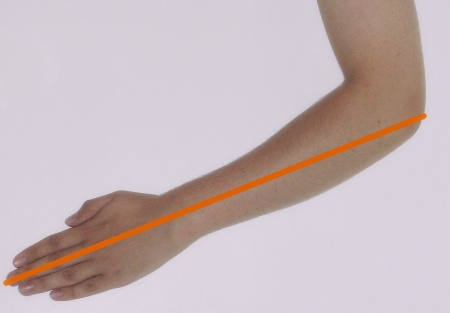
Ell (measure of length)

The Ancient Arabic units of measurement were a system of using units to associate with physical quantities. Arabic symbols are used to represent the values. The measurements were based on body measurements and common natural items. The length of forearm, shin and the standard size of a typical village were among the most accepted length units. About surface, usually Jerib or Djerib, was the most usual unit which is mostly similar to acre or hectare. Another unit known as Sa was mostly used to measure volume which is approximately equal to 3 liters. Although having similar names, the size of units may differ depending on region.

== Length ==
Esbaa إصبع	1/16 Arabic foot	~2.25 cm	A finger-length
Qabḍhah قبضة	fist: 1/4 Arabic foot	~9 cm	A palm-length
Arabic foot قدم عربية		~32 cm	
Dhira ذراع	cubit: traditionally 2 Arabic feet, later 1 1/2 Arabic feet		Cubit
Qamma قامة	fathom: 6 Arabic feet	~1.92 m	A pace-length
Qaṣbah قصبة	12 Arabic feet	~3.84 m	A cane-length
Seirسير	stade: 600 Arabic feet	~192 m	
Ghalwah غلوة	720 Arabic feet	~230.4 m	
Parasang فرسخ	parasang or league: 18,000 Arabic feet	~5.76 km	
Barid بريد	4 parasang	~23.04 km	
Marḥalah مرحلة	8 parasang	~46.08 km	A village-length.

== See also ==
- Uqiyyah, the Arabic ounce or half-pound, depending on region.
- Qafiz, an Arabic unit for measuring volumes.
- Sāʿ, an ancient unit of volume, equal to 2 to 4 liters, depending on region.
- The Arabic mile (al-mīl), a unit of length employed by Arab geographers and scientists.
