= Rest area =

Public area, usually adjacent to limited-access highway, used for rest from travel

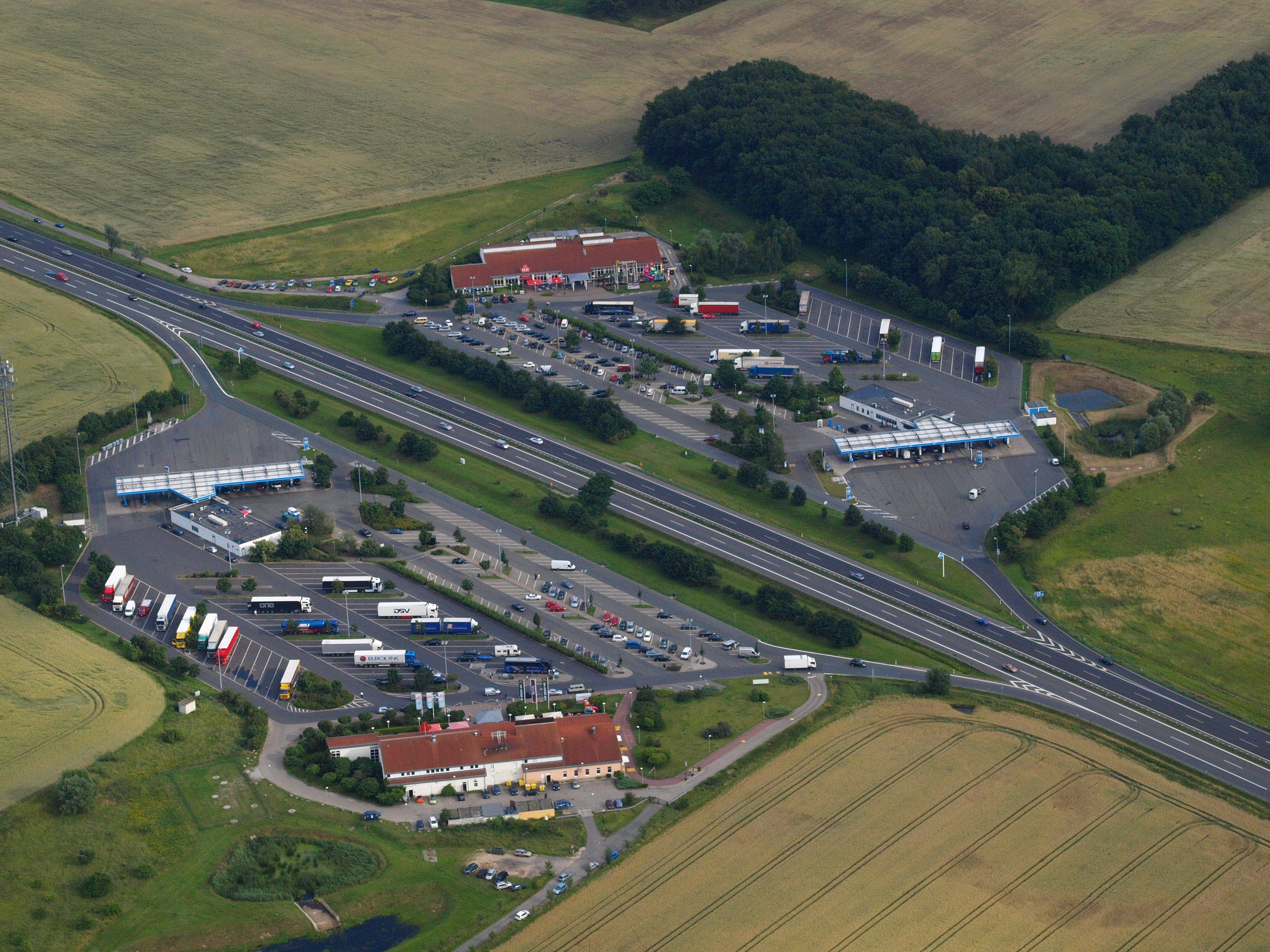
Aerial photograph of the Linumer Bruch rest areas at the A 24 motorway in Germany

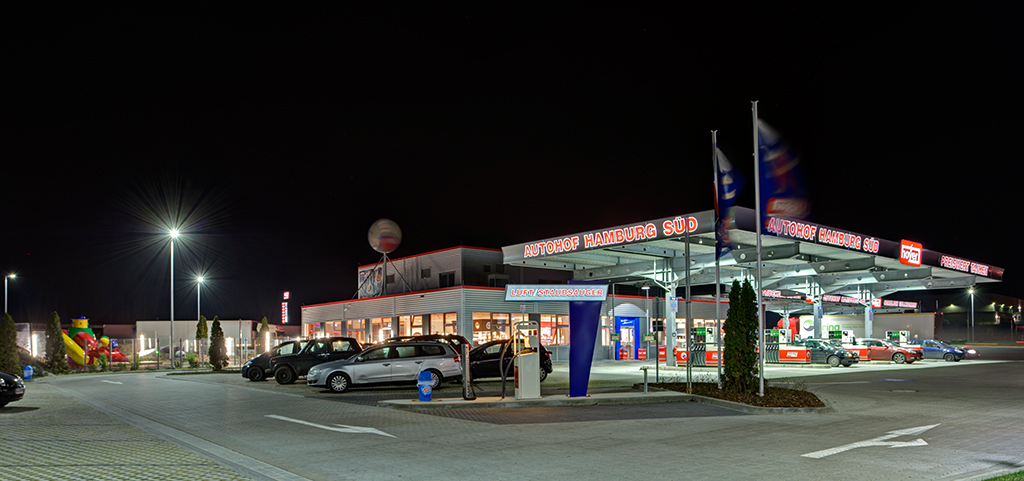
Fuel dispensers at an autohof near a German autobahn in Lower Saxony. Autohöfe, just like rest areas, provide travellers a place to refuel, as well as eat, and rest.

A rest area is a public facility located next to a large thoroughfare such as a motorway, expressway, or highway, at which drivers and passengers can rest, eat, or refuel without exiting onto secondary roads. Other names include motorway service area (UK), services (UK), travel plaza, rest stop, service area, rest and service area (RSA), resto, service plaza, lay-by, and service centre. Facilities may include park-like areas, fuel stations, public toilets, water fountains, restaurants, and dump and fill stations for caravans and motorhomes.

A rest area with limited to no public facilities is a lay-by, scenic area, or scenic overlook. Along some highways and roads are services known as wayside parks, roadside parks, or picnic areas.

== Overview ==
The availability, standards and upkeep of facilities at a stop vary by jurisdiction. Service stations have parking areas allotted for cars and trucks, semi trucks, as well as buses and caravans.

Most rest areas tend to be located in more remote or rural areas, where there are likely no fast food eateries (let alone any full-service restaurants), fuel stations, hotels, campgrounds or other roadside services nearby. The locations of these remote rest areas are usually marked by signs on the freeway or motorway; for example, a sign may read, "Next Rest Area 64 miles", "Next Services 48 miles" or "Next Rest Stop 10 km". However, some rest areas are located close to or in cities, to serve motorists passing through that municipality without them having to exit onto secondary roads. In line with freeways/motorways being fully controlled-access, most rest areas allow general access by freeway entry/exit only and do not connect to adjacent roads, even those located in cities. Some of these urban rest areas may have restricted access to surface streets, during construction, and on an ongoing basis for staff, suppliers' deliveries, and waste disposal.

Driving information is usually available at these locations, such as posted maps and advertising for local tourist attractions, along with public toilets. However, depending on the location or standards of the area, some stops have rows of portable toilets ("porta-potties") available rather than a more permanent structure or restroom building. Some rest areas have visitor information kiosks, or even counters with staff on duty in order to promote local tourism. There may also be drinking fountains, vending machines, pay telephones, a fuel station, an automobile repair shop, a restaurant/food court, and a convenience store at rest areas. Some rest areas provide free coffee for long-distance drivers, paid for by donations from other travelers (or donations from local businesses, civic groups, churches, etc.). Many service stations have Wi-Fi access, bookshops and newsstands. Many scenic rest areas have picnic areas. Service areas tend to have traveller information in the form of so-called "exit guides", which often contain very basic maps and advertisements for local motels and nearby tourist attractions.

Privatised commercial services may take the form of a truck stop, usually including a filling station, shower and/or laundry facilities, convenience store, fast food restaurant(s), or their own cafeteria/food court. Some also have amenities such as arcade games and playgrounds, or offer business and financial services such as ATMs, office cubicles, and Wi-Fi.

=== Safety issues ===
Some rest areas have the reputations of being unsafe with regard to crime, especially at night, since they are usually situated in remote or rural areas and inherently attract transient individuals. California's current policy is to maintain existing public rest areas but no longer build new ones, due to the cost and difficulty of keeping them safe, although many California rest stops now feature highway patrol quarters.

== Asia ==
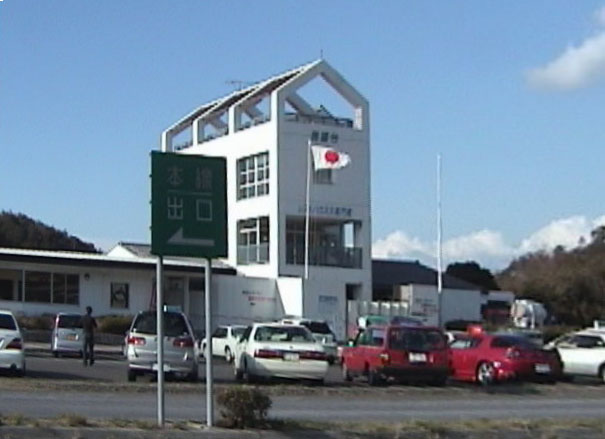
Honshū-Shikoku contact bridge, a rest station at Great Naruto Bridge in Japan

In Malaysia, Indonesia, Iran, Saudi Arabia, and Turkey, rest areas have prayer rooms (musola / masjid) for Muslims travelling more than 90 kilometres (56 mi) (2 marhalah; 1 marhalah ≈ 45 kilometres (28 mi)). In Iran it is called esterāhatgāh (Persian: استراحتگاه), meaning 'rest area'.

In the Philippines, Thailand, and Vietnam, bus travel is common; long-distance bus rides typically include stops at rest areas designed for bus passengers. These rest stops typically have a small restaurant as well as a small store for buying food. Some have proper restrooms and even souvenir shops.

=== Japan ===
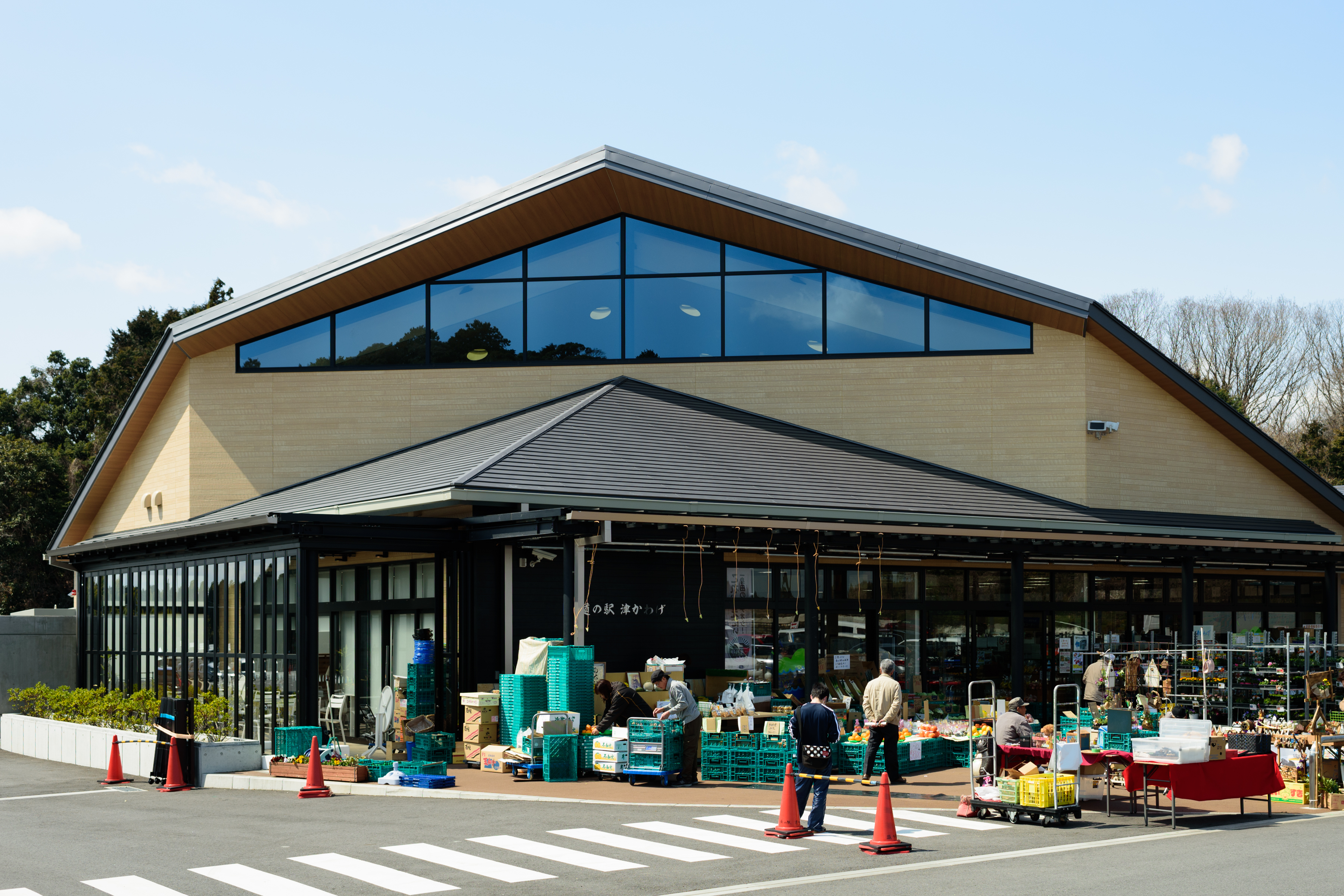
Roadside station Tsu Kawage in Tsu, Mie Prefecture

In Japan, there are two grades of rest areas on Japan's tolled expressways. These are part of the expressway system, allowing a person to stop without exiting the expressway, as exiting and reentering the tollway would lead to a higher overall toll for the trip. They are modeled and named after the motorway service stations in the United Kingdom.

The larger type of rest area is called a service area, abbreviated SA. SAs are usually very large facilities with parking for hundreds of cars and many buses—offering toilets, smoking areas, convenience stores, pet relief areas, restaurants, regional souvenir shops, a filling station, and sometimes even tourist attractions, such as a ferris wheel or a view of a famous location. They are usually spaced about one hour apart on the system, and often a planned stop for tour buses. Two service areas also have a motel. The other grade of rest stop is a parking area", or a PA. PAs are much smaller, and spaced roughly 20 minutes apart on the system. Besides a small parking lot, toilets and drink vending machines are the only consistent amenities offered, while some larger parking areas have small shops, local goods, and occasionally a filling station—but are much smaller than their larger service area counterparts.

Since the 1990s, many Japanese towns have also established roadside stations along highway and trunk routes. In addition to the conventional aspects of service areas, most also provide shops and restaurants dedicated to local culture and local produce, and a number of them also feature information centers, community halls, leisure facilities including hot springs and parks, and other features unique to individual stations. There are now over a thousand across Japan.

In the past, there were shukuba (stage stations) which served as resting places for people travelling along traditional routes by horse or foot before modern transportation was introduced to Japan.

=== Malaysia ===
In Malaysia, an overhead bridge restaurant (OBR), or overhead restaurant, is a special rest area with restaurants above the expressway. Unlike typical laybys and RSAs, which are only accessible in one-way direction only, an overhead restaurant is accessible from both directions of the expressway.

=== Philippines ===
In the Philippines, barring certain exceptions, rest areas typically occupy large land areas with restaurants and retail space on top of filling stations. There are 10 service stations in the North Luzon Expressway, nine service stations in the South Luzon Expressway, three service stations in both STAR Tollway and SCTEX, and a Caltex service station in Muntinlupa-Cavite Expressway.

=== South Korea ===
In South Korea, a rest area usually includes a park and fast casual restaurants that sell regional specialties. Korean rest areas are usually very large and clean. Cellphone charging is free and Wi-Fi is available at every rest area.

=== Taiwan ===
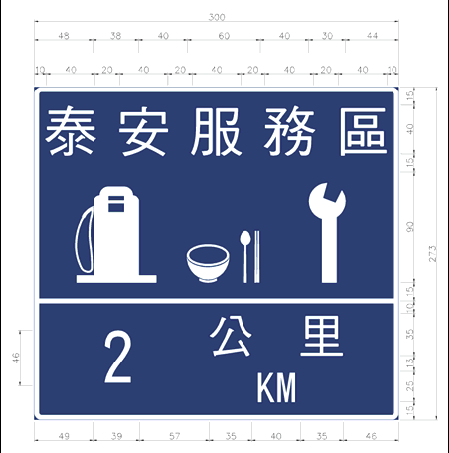
Guide sign of Tai'an Service Area in Taichung City.

In Taiwan, rest areas are maintained by the Freeway Bureau and the Directorate General of Highways. There are 21 rest areas along four important freeways: Freeways Number 1 (Sun Yat-sen Freeway), 3 (Formosa Freeway), 5 (Chiang Wei-shui Memorial Freeway), 6 (Shuishalian Freeway) and one expressway (West Coast Expressway).

=== Thailand ===
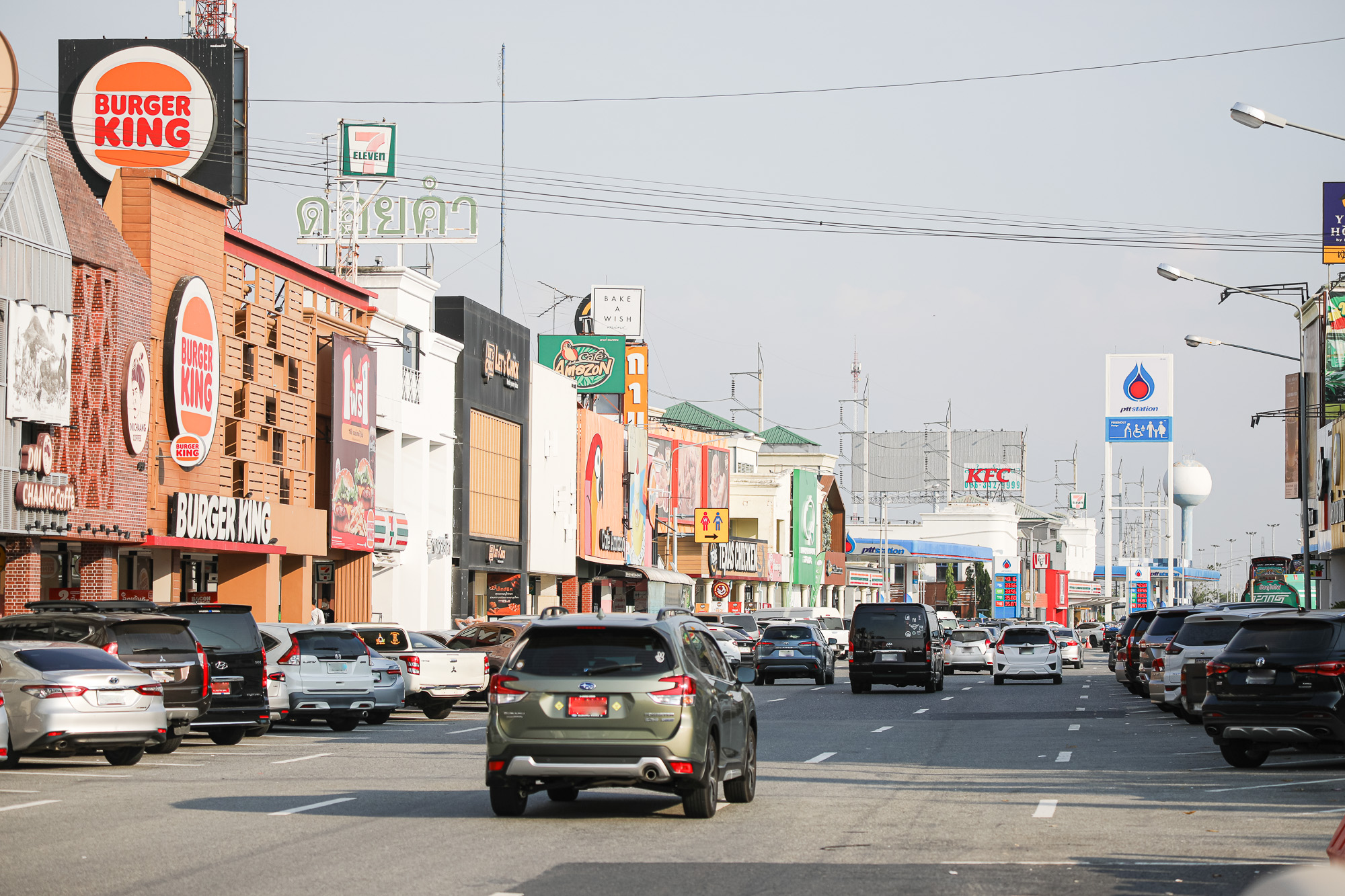
Service Area on Motorway 7

In Thailand, rest areas are considered part of the national highway, especially on intercity highways (motorways), which are under the supervision of the Department of Highways.

For standard rest areas in the areas of motorways and concession highways, they are divided into three types:

- Service Centers, accommodation on large highways, with an area of approximately 50 rai or more
- Service Area, medium-sized highway accommodation, with an area of about 20 rai or more.
- Rest Stop, a small highway accommodation, with an area of approximately 5 acres or more.

There are four rest areas on motorways on Motorway 7 and Motorway 9 and there are plans to open for service in total 18 rest areas.

== Europe ==
In some countries, such as Spain, rest areas are uncommon, as motorists are directed to establishments that serve both the traveling public and the local population. In other areas, access to a rest area is impossible other than from a motorway. The Dutch rest area, De Lucht,^{(nl)} is fairly typical of many European rest areas, in that it has no access roads—other than from the motorway, itself.

=== Austria and Germany ===
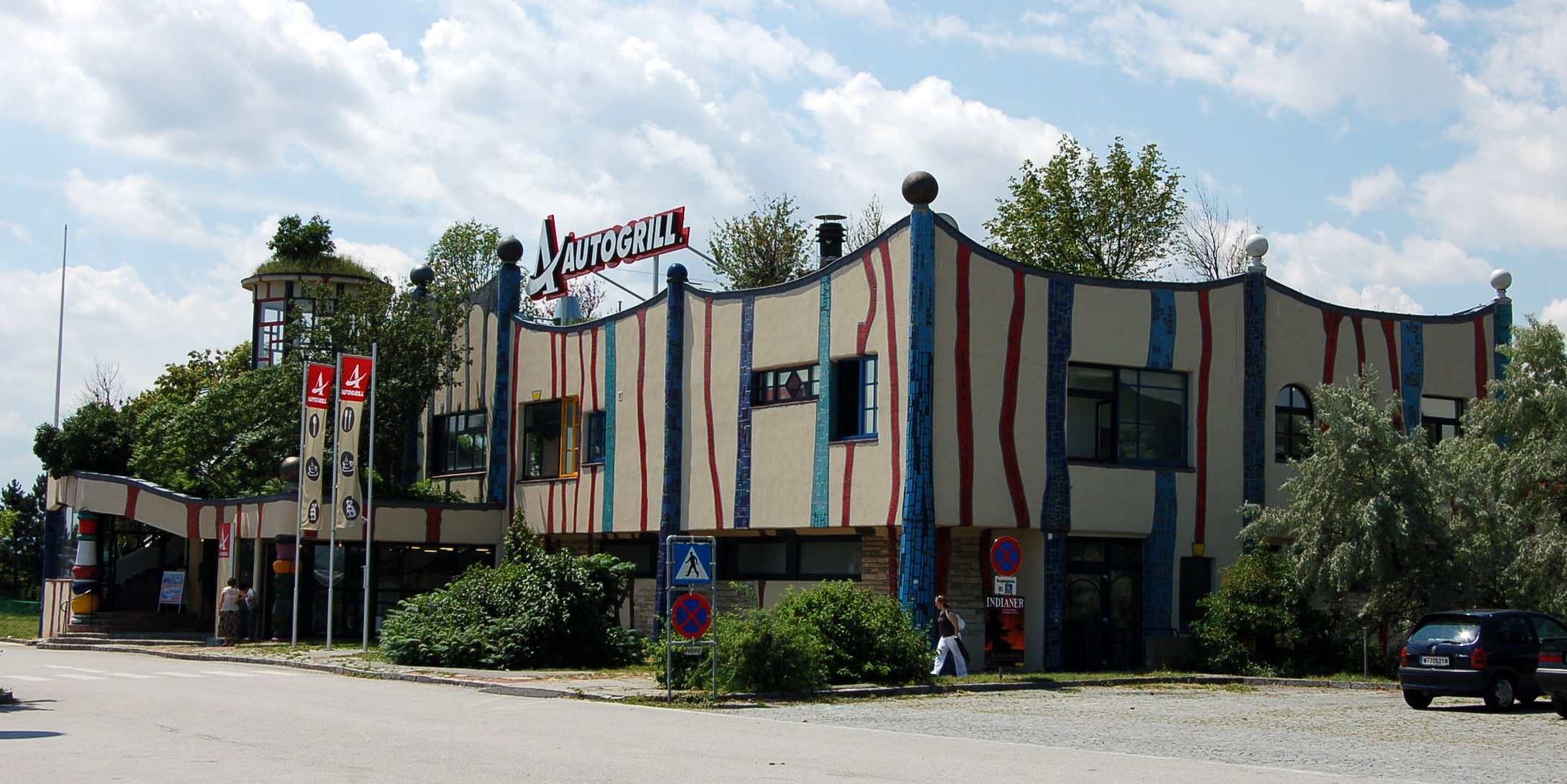
Raststätte Bad Fischau at the Süd Autobahn in Austria

Raststätte (de:Autobahnraststätte) is the name for service areas on the German and Austrian Autobahn. They often include a fuel station, public phones, restaurants, restrooms, parking and, occasionally, a hotel or a motel. If the service area is off the motorway, it is named Rasthof or Autohof.

Smaller parking areas, mostly known as a Rastplatz (de:Rastplatz), are more frequent, but they have only picnic tables, and sometimes, toilets (signposted).

=== Finland ===
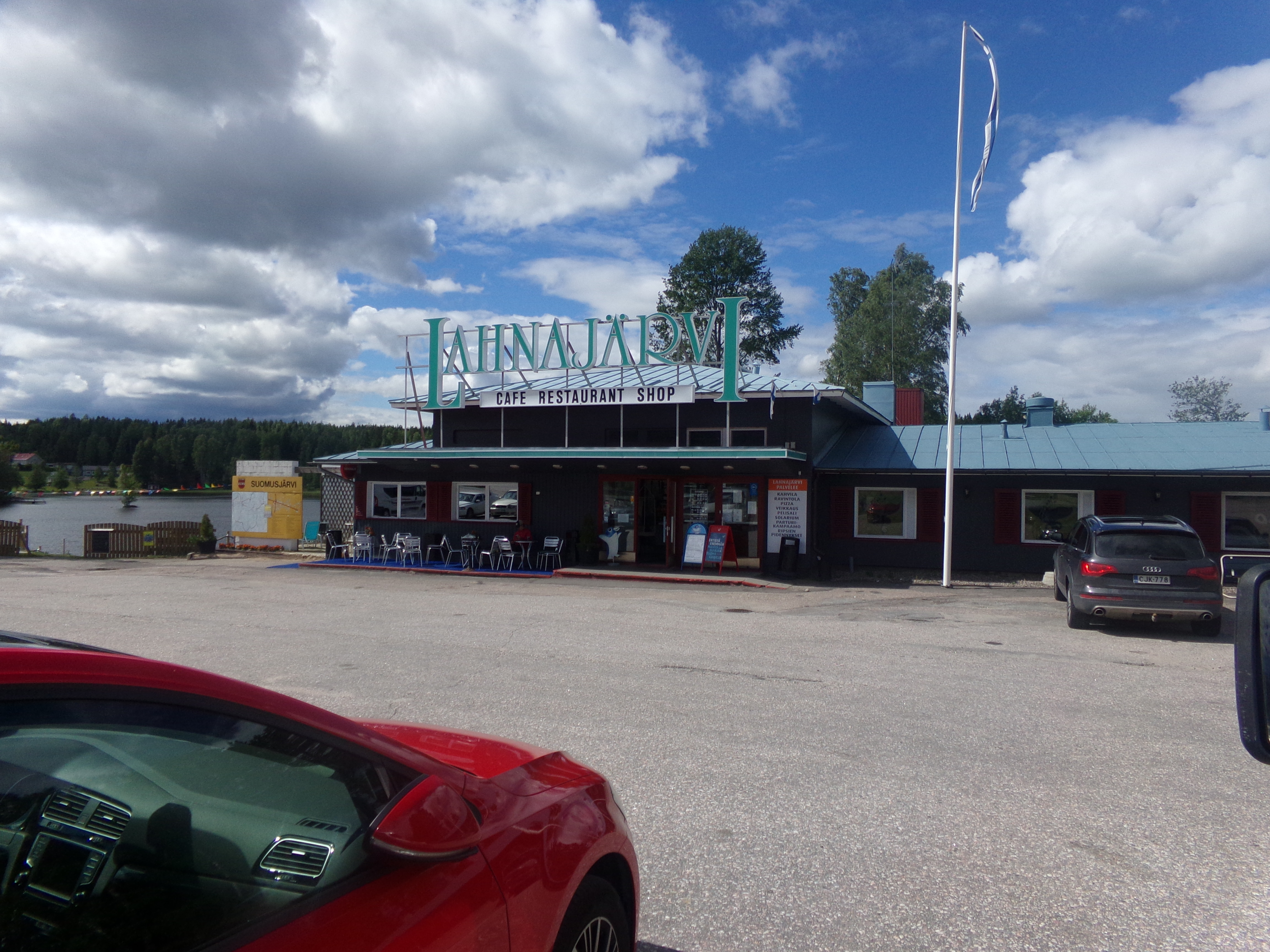
Lahnajärvi's rest area in Salo, Finland

Rest areas are constructed and maintained by the Finnish government, while the local municipality provides area maps and sanitary services. If there are commercial services, the shop inherits the responsibility for cleanliness and upkeep of the area. Rest areas are designed mostly for long-distance drivers. The recommendation in Finland is that there should be a rest area each 20 km (12 miles).

=== France ===
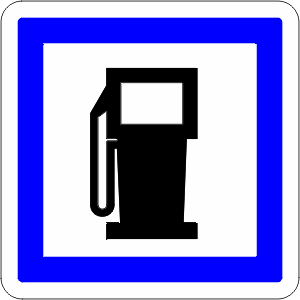
French rest area signage used on controlled-access highways

In France, both full-service rest areas and picnic sites are provided on the autoroute network, and regulations dictate there to be one such area every 20 km (12.4 miles). Both types may also be found on national (N-class) highways, although less frequently than on autoroutes. They are known as aires, or aire de service and aire de pique-nique, respectively; aire de repos ("rest area") usually refers to a picnic stop. These areas are not usually stated on approach signs, but are rather distinguished by the symbols used. A name is usually given, generally that of a nearby town or village, such as "aire de Garonne".

=== United Kingdom and Ireland ===
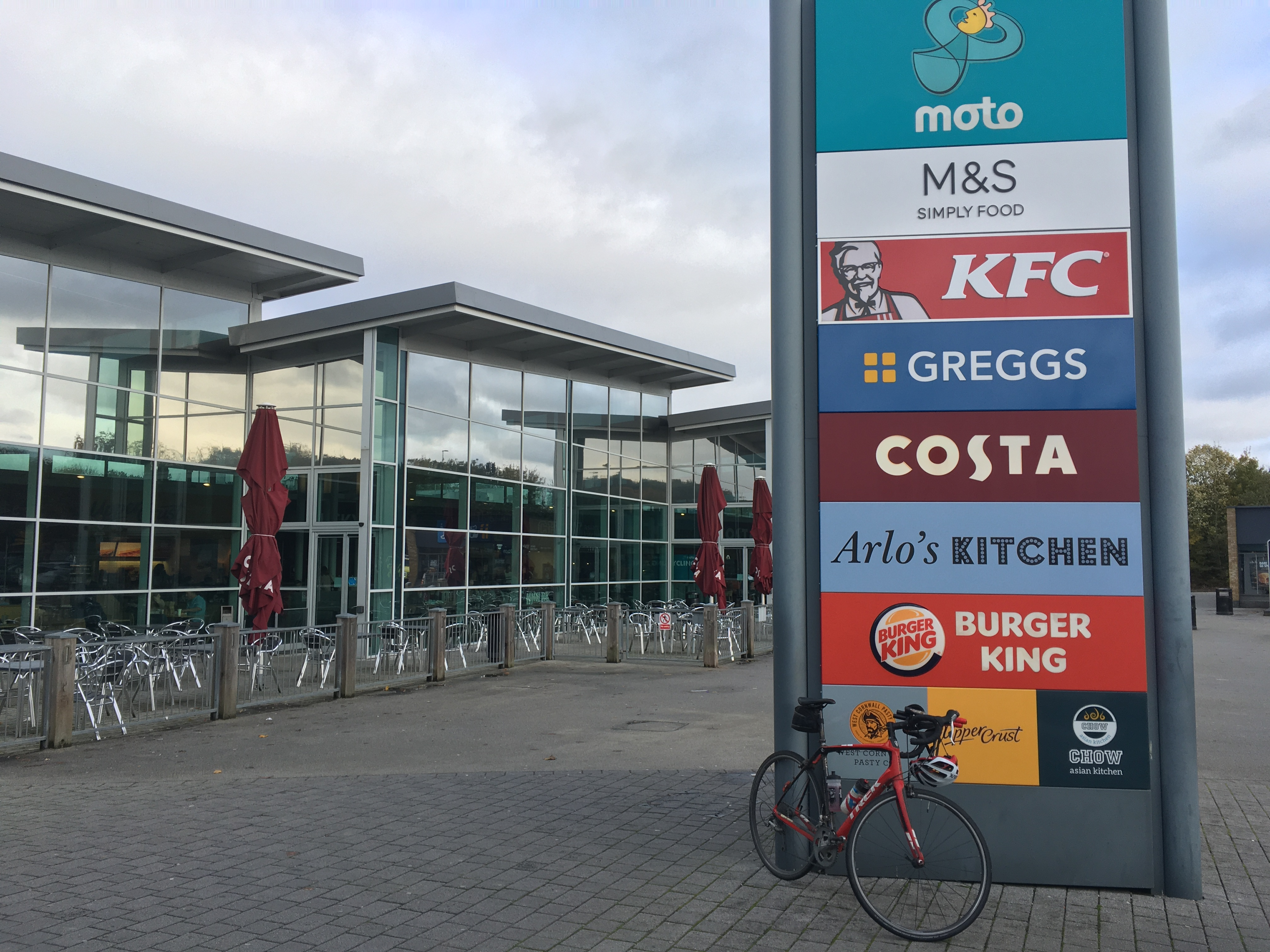
Signage for services provided at Cherwell Valley services, UK. Most motorway services accommodate restaurants, fast food outlets, and coffee shops.

The term rest area is not generally used in the United Kingdom and Ireland. The most common term is services, an abbreviation of motorway service areas (MSA) or motorway service stations. As with the rest of the world, these are places where drivers can leave a motorway to refuel, rest, or get refreshments. Most service stations accommodate fast food outlets, restaurants, coffee shops, general goods, stationery and book shops and mini supermarkets. Some service stations also incorporate hotels.

Services may also be present on non-motorway roads, as well; many A-roads have services, possibly only providing a petrol station and, in some cases, a restaurant or café.

The majority of service areas within Ireland are operated by Circle K or Applegreen, and contain fuel stations, truck stops, shops and fast food outlets, such as McDonalds, Burger King, Subway or Chopstix; they differ, from the United Kingdom for example, in that only one service station contains a hotel (the M7 services in Portlaoise, County Laois).

==== Lay-bys ====
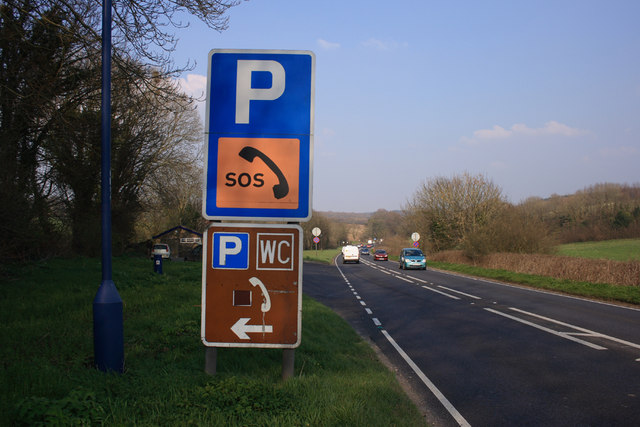
Signage for a larger lay-by with some facilities near Dorchester, UK

The term lay-by is used in the UK and Ireland to describe a roadside parking or rest area for drivers. Equivalent terms in the United States are turnout or pullout.

Lay-bys can vary in size, from a simple parking bay alongside the carriageway (sufficient for one or two cars only) to substantial areas that are separated from the carriageway by verges, which can accommodate dozens of vehicles. Lay-bys are to be found on the side of most rural UK roads, except motorways that are not on sections of smart motorways (but for emergencies only) where the hard shoulder is missing. They are marked by a rectangular blue sign bearing a white letter P, and there should also be advance warning of lay-bys to give drivers time to slow down safely.

== North America ==
=== Canada ===
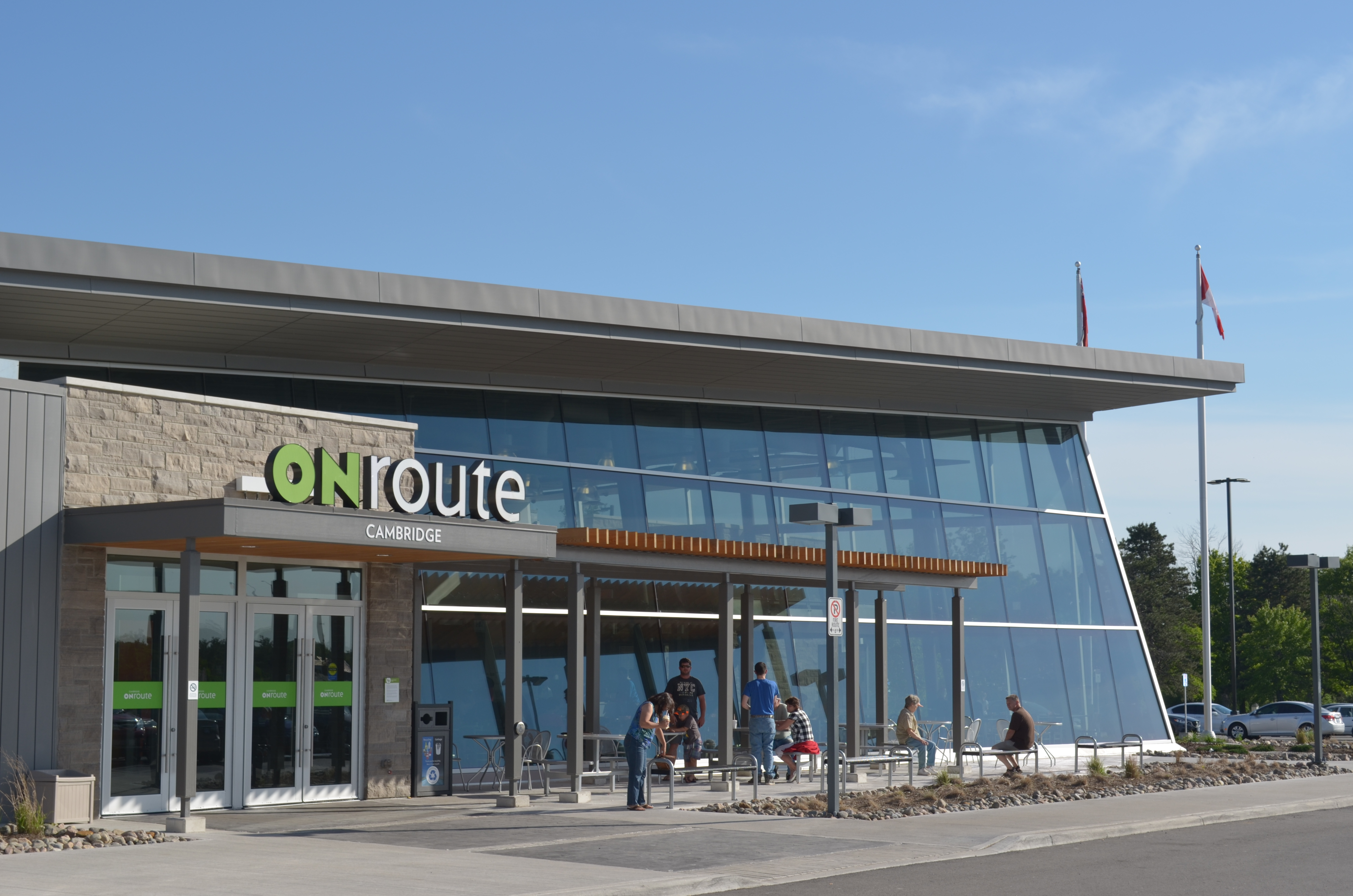
A service centre in Cambridge, Ontario

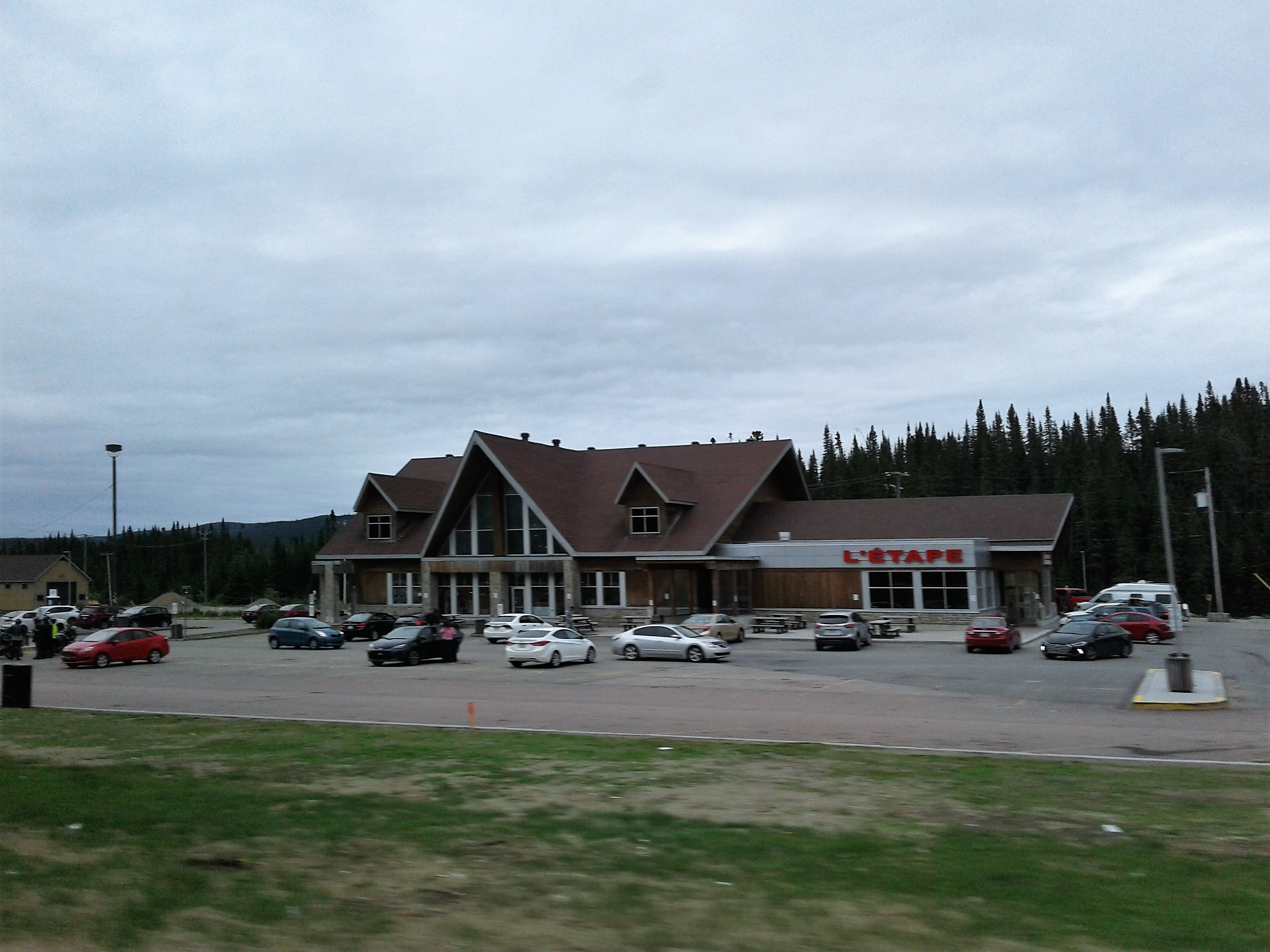
A service centre in Québec

In Canada, roadside services are known as service centres in most provinces. In some instances, where there are no retail facilities, they may be known as rest areas or text stops (halte-texto in French). Most service centres are concentrated along Ontario's 400-series highway and Quebec's Autoroute networks, while rest areas are found along the highway networks of all provinces, and the Trans-Canada Highway.

In New Brunswick, the only rest areas are roadside parks with picnic tables and washrooms operated as a part of the provincial park system. However, many have closed due to cutbacks. Occasionally, litter barrels are also found along the side of the road.

The Prairie provinces of Saskatchewan and Manitoba have rest stops located along the Trans-Canada Highway (Highway 1). However, these stops are simply places to rest, or go to the washroom; they are not built to the standard rest area found on the 400-series highways in Ontario, or the Interstate Highways of the United States.

==== Alberta ====
Alberta Transportation operates seven provincial rest areas or safety rest areas. These include:

- Highway 1 (Trans-Canada Highway) westbound between Brooks and Bassano;
- Highway 1 (Trans-Canada Highway) eastbound between Tilley and Suffield;
- Highway 2 (Queen Elizabeth II Highway) southbound between Crossfield and Airdrie;
- Highway 2 (Queen Elizabeth II Highway) northbound near Highway 13 west of Wetaskiwin;
- Highway 16 (Yellowhead Highway) eastbound and westbound between Edson and Carrot Creek;
- Highway 43 accessible from both directions south of Valleyview; and
- Highway 63 accessible both ways between Atmore and Breynat.

Alberta Transportation also designates partnership rest areas or highway service rest areas that are privately owned and operated highway user facilities. These facilities are located on Highway 1 at Dead Man's Flats, Highway 2 at Red Deer (Gasoline Alley), Highway 9 near Hanna, Highway 16 at Niton Junction and at Innisfree, and Highway 43 at Rochfort Bridge.

==== British Columbia ====
British Columbia has many services centres on its provincial roads, particularly along the Yellowhead Highway/Highway 16, the Coquihalla Highway/Highway 5, and on Highway 97C, the first service centres built in the province. One notable curiosity is a service centre built along Highway 118: it is a minor road connecting two towns to the Yellowhead Highway (Hwy. 16).

==== Ontario ====
Ontario has a modern and well-developed network of service centres, most being branded as ONroute, located along Highway 401 along the Quebec City-Windsor Corridor, as well as the segment of Highway 400 south of Barrie. Other shorter and/or less trafficked 400-series highways (including the northern sections of Highway 400), do not have even basic rest areas along them at all, though gas stations and fast food restaurants are located close to interchanges with these freeways.

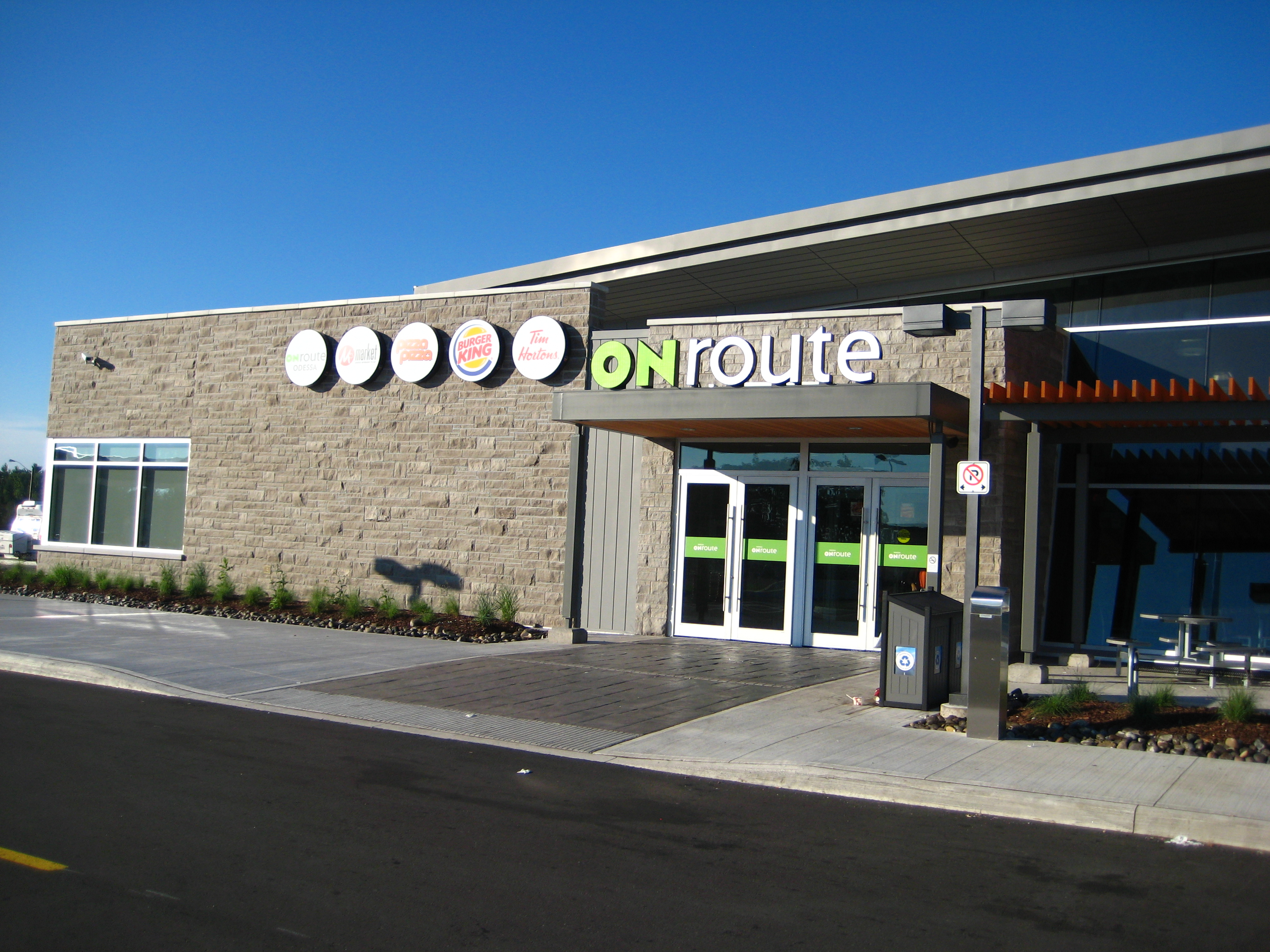
An ONroute service centre in Kingston, Ontario. The province has a number of ONroute service centres along its highway network.

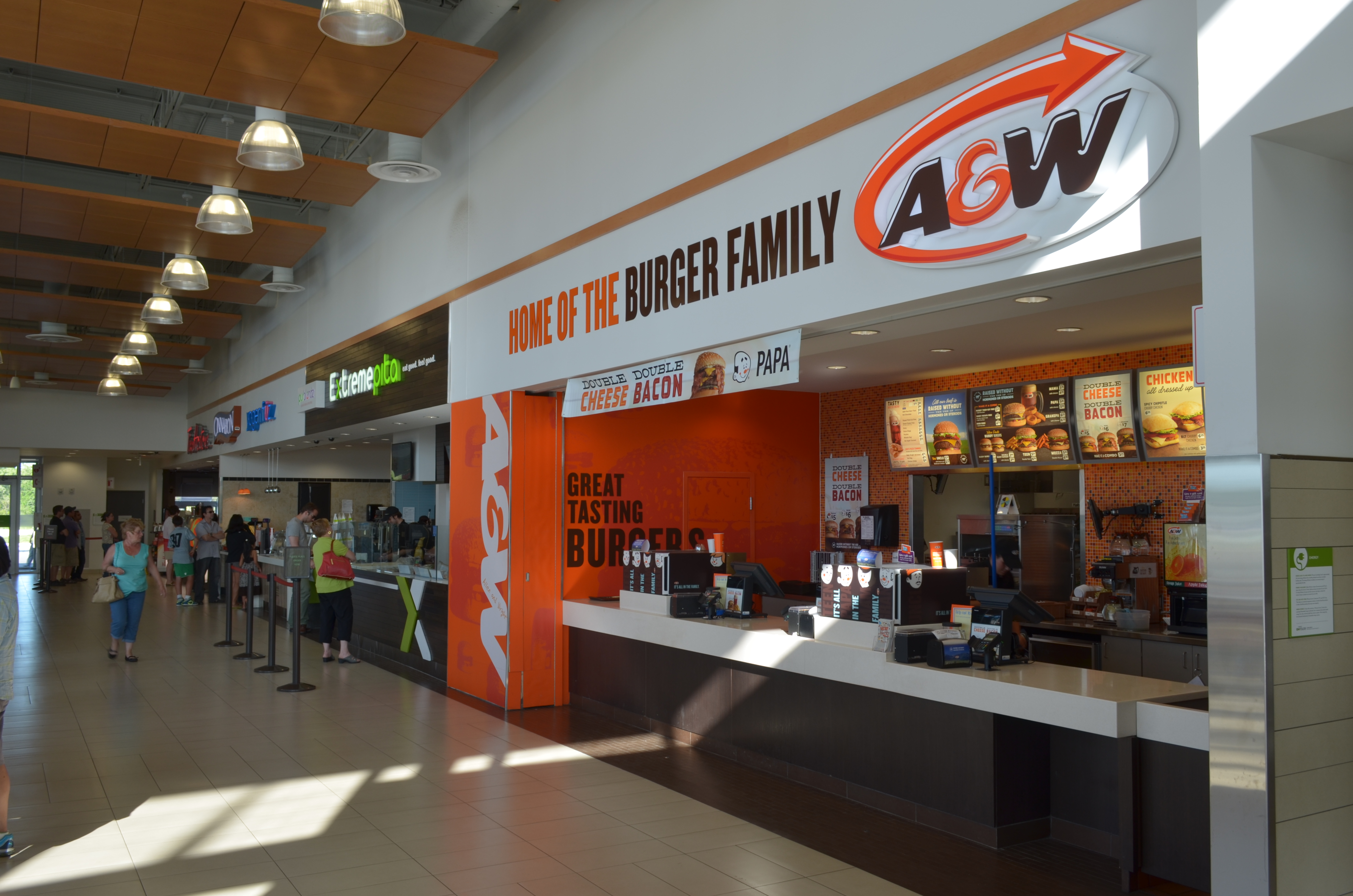
Interior of an ONroute in Cambridge, which accommodates several fast food restaurant outlets, typical of Ontario service centres.

The original service centres for Highway 401 were mostly built around 1962. The service centres in Ontario were originally of a generic, cafeteria-style nature. They contain filling stations, washrooms, picnic areas, and vending machines. During the late 1980s the service centres were taken over by Scott's Hospitality, a major publicly traded Canadian restaurant operator, who leased them out to major oil companies and fast food restaurant chains, with a single gasoline distributor and sole restaurant for most locations, with some centres also receiving limited renovations in the early 1990s to extend their service life by a couple decades. In 1991, a service centre was placed in Mississauga to cater to eastbound traffic entering the west of the Greater Toronto Area; this location was branded as Info Centre, promoting Toronto tourism, and served until its closure on September 30, 2006. The rest areas on Highway 401 at Ingersoll and Newcastle (both serving only the westbound carriageway) and the Highway 400 rest area in Maple (Vaughan) (serving southbound traffic only) were completely rebuilt to a shared design in the late 1990s, and remain in service today with minor modifications. In 2010–11, all the remaining older service centres were replaced by a common design operated by HMSHost subsidiary Host Kilmer under the ONroute banner, which features a selection of fast food providers akin to a food court.

In line with the 400-series Highways being fully controlled-access, all of these service centres allow general access by freeway entry/exit only and do not connect to adjacent roads, even those located in cities. Some of these urban service centres may have restricted access to surface streets, during construction, and on an ongoing basis for staff, suppliers deliveries, and waste disposal. The only exception was the Cookstown service centre, which was directly connected to Highway 89 (a surface street) as well as the Highway 400 freeway since the centre was located at their interchange. The Cookstown service centre closed on February 1, 2013 in order to accommodate reconfiguration of the interchange ramps, being replaced by a new service centre (Innisfil ONRoute) on Highway 400 north of Fourth Line which opened in June 2015.

Outside of the ONRoute locations there are 211 rest areas along provincial highways. Most are basic stops (picnic area) with restrooms for most locations and parking for most vehicles (commercial trucks may not be serviced at small areas). Most are seasonal operated from mid May to mid November.

Reese's Corner at the intersection of Highway 21 and Highway 7 is often considered a service centre. Although Highway 7 was bypassed by the freeway Highway 402 in the late 1970s, Reese's Corner still receives much traffic as it is only a short distance from the interchange of Highway 402 and Highway 21 (Exit 25). Lastly, truck inspection stations (which are more frequent than service centres) can be used by travellers for bathroom breaks, although this is not encouraged.

Two off-highway service campuses at Exit 74 along the Queen Elizabeth Way in Grimsby are unofficial rest areas for travelling motorists. Two smaller such facilities (Seguin Trail Road south of Parry Sound and Port Severn Road in Port Severn) also exist on the less-busy section Highway 400 north of the last official on-highway service centre.

==== Quebec ====
In Quebec, rest areas are known as haltes routières and service areas as aires de services. Rest rooms and picnic areas are located along the autoroutes and many of the provincial highways. Some of the rest areas have vending machines and/or canteens. Some truck and isolated rest areas have no services or they have been removed due to facilities having deteriorated beyond repair. Beginning in 2019, the province began to modernize some rest areas to provide needs for families and truckers.

There are about 10 service areas (on Highways 10, 15, 20, 40, 55, 117, and 175); with some of these rest areas have restrooms, filling stations and restaurants/vending machines.

=== United States ===
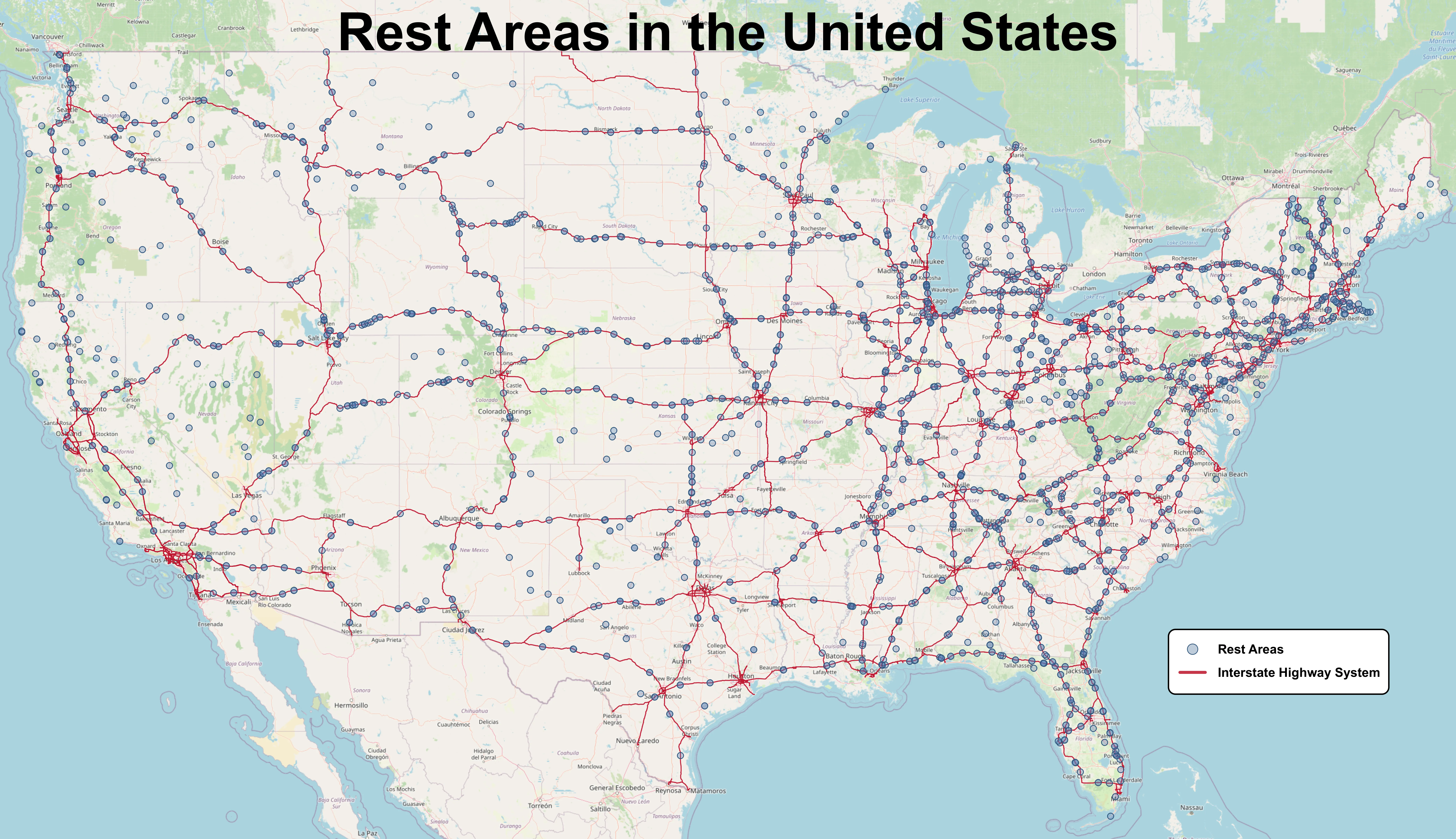
Rest areas in the United States

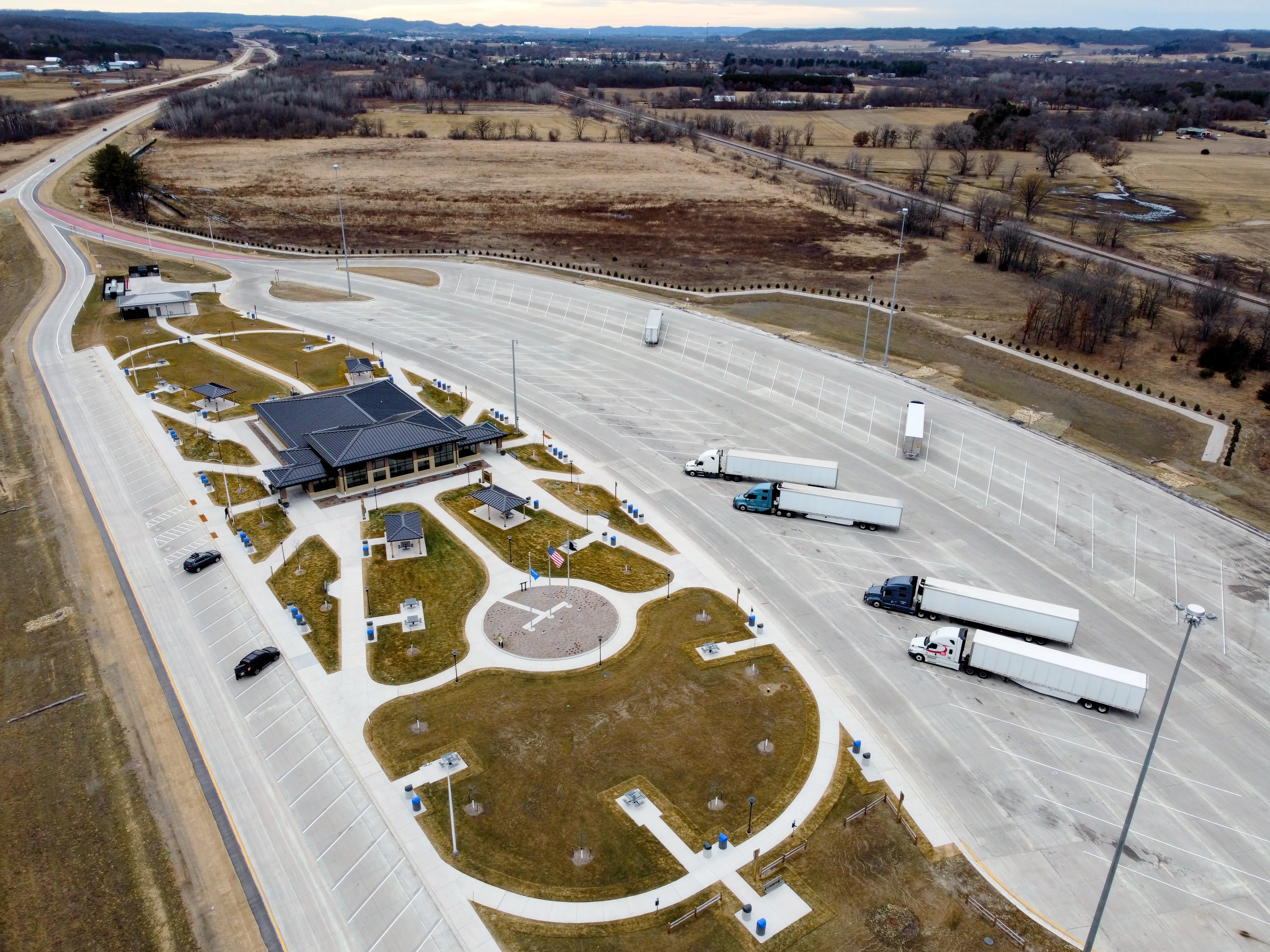
Rest stop on I-90 in Wisconsin on the west bound lanes, near Sparta, Wisconsin.

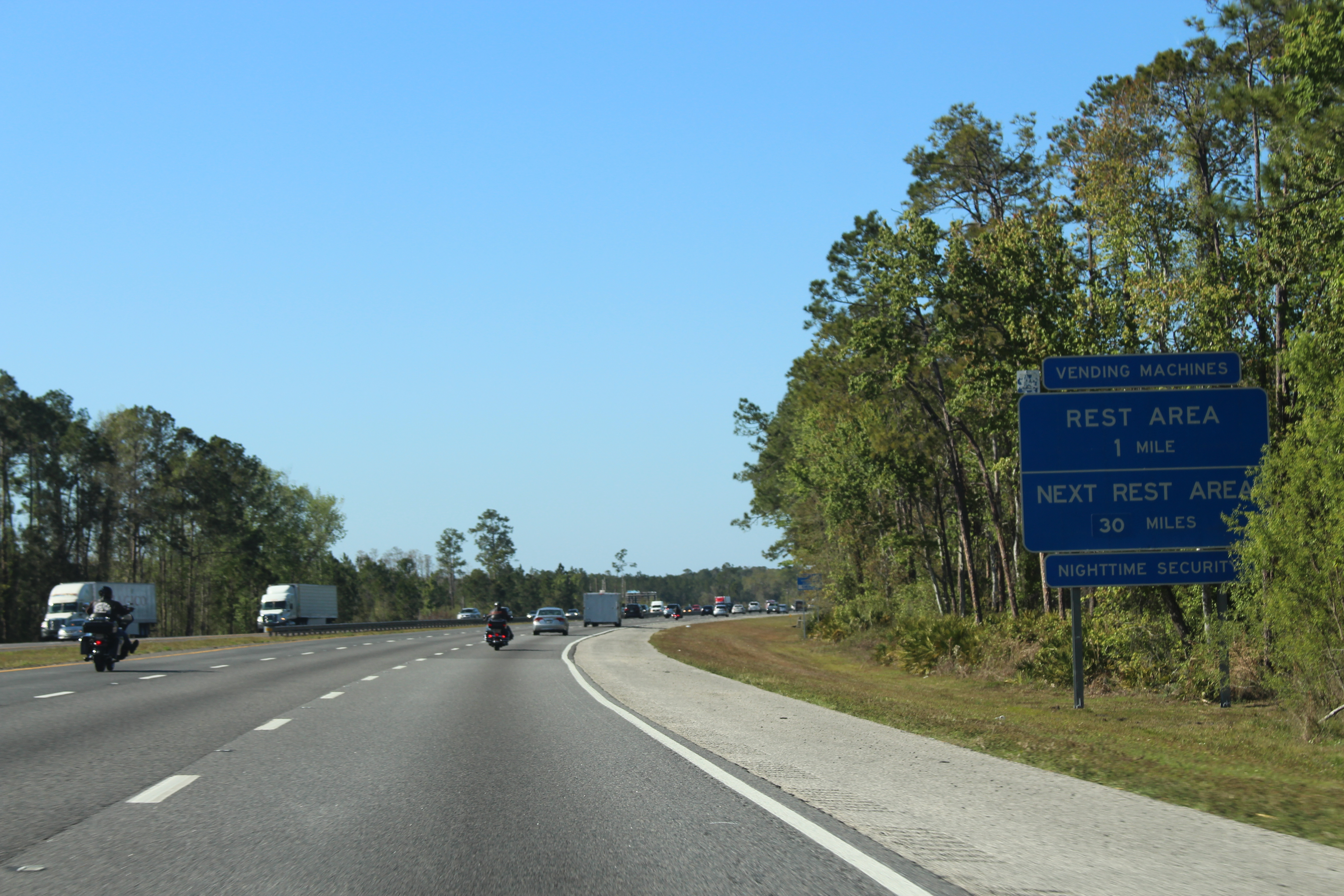
A rest area sign on Interstate 95 in Florida. The sign also makes note of the existence of secure overnight parking and vending machines in the rest area.

In the United States, rest areas are typically non-commercial facilities that provide, at a minimum, parking and restrooms. In the United States, there are 1,840 rest areas along interstate routes. They usually have information kiosks, vending machines, and picnic areas, but little else. Some have "dump" facilities, where recreational vehicles may empty their sewage holding tanks. They are typically maintained and funded by the departments of transportation of the state governments. For example, rest areas in California are maintained by Caltrans. In 2008, state governments began to close some rest areas as a result of the Great Recession.

Some places, such as California, have laws that explicitly prohibit private retailers from occupying rest stops. A federal statute passed by Congress also prohibits states from allowing private businesses to occupy rest areas along interstate highways. The relevant clause of 23 U.S.C. § 111 states:

The State will not permit automotive service stations or other commercial establishments for serving motor vehicle users to be constructed or located on the rights-of-way of the Interstate System.

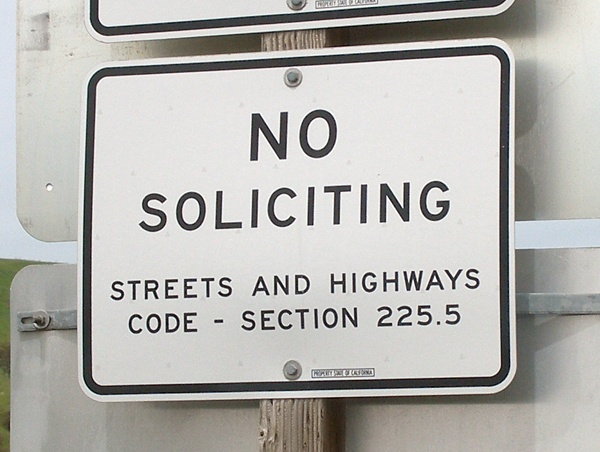
"No soliciting" sign in a rest area in California. Some states, like California, prohibit private retailers from occupying rest areas.

The original reason for this clause was to protect innumerable small towns whose survival depended upon providing roadside services such as gasoline, food, and lodging. Because of it, private truck stops and travel plazas have blossomed into a $171 billion industry in the United States. The clause was immediately followed by an exception for facilities constructed prior to January 1, 1960, many of which continue to exist, as explained further below.

Therefore, the standard practice is that private businesses must buy up land near existing exits and build their own facilities to serve travelers. Such facilities often have tall signs that can be seen from several miles away (so that travelers have adequate time to make a decision). In turn, it is somewhat harder to visit such private facilities, because one has to first exit the freeway and navigate through several intersections to reach a desired business's parking lot, rather than exit directly into a rest area's parking lot. Public rest areas are usually (but not always) positioned so as not to compete with private businesses.

Special blue signs indicating gas, food, lodging, camping and roadside attractions near an exit can be found on most freeways in the United States. Beginning in the mid-1970s, private businesses have been permitted to display their logos or trademarks on these signs by paying a transportation department (or a subcontractor to a transportation department) a small fee. Until the release of the 2000 edition of the Manual on Uniform Traffic Control Devices, these signs were allowed only on the rural sections of highways. The 2000 MUTCD added provisions for allowing these signs on highways in urban areas as long as adequate sign spacing can be maintained, however, some states (such as California and New York) continue to restrict these signs to rural areas only. These signs are allowed on urban freeways in 15 states, with Arizona being the most recent state (as of 2013) to repeal the restriction of these signs to only rural highways.

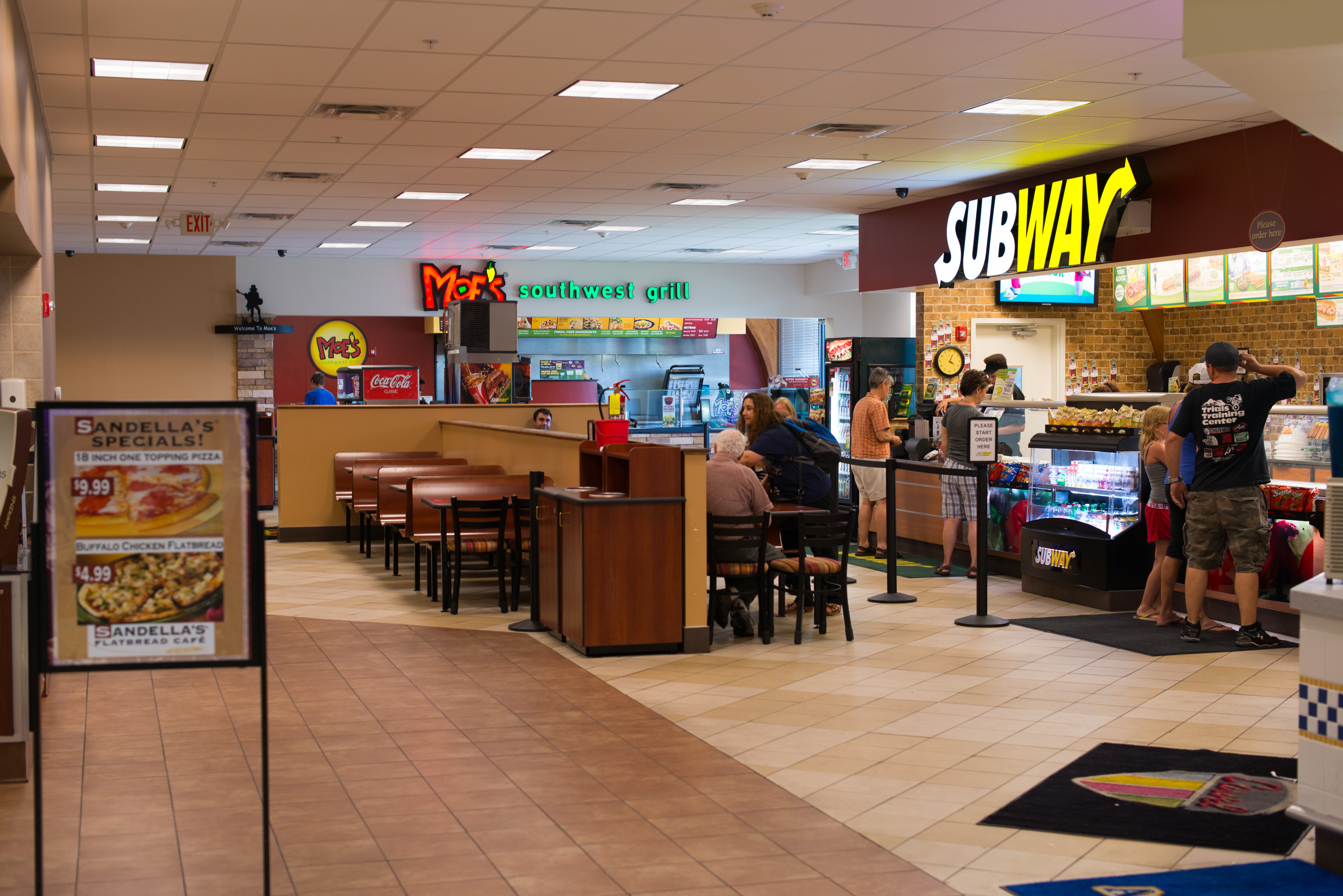
A rest area featuring several private fast food chains in Angola, New York

Attempts to remove the federal ban on privatized rest areas have been generally unsuccessful, due to resistance from existing businesses that have already made enormous capital investments in their existing locations.

For example, in 2003, Congress's federal highway funding reauthorization bill contained a clause allowing states to start experimenting with privatized rest areas on Interstate highways. The clause was fiercely resisted by the National Association of Truck Stop Owners (NATSO), which argued that allowing such rest areas would shift revenue to state governments (in the form of lease payments) that would have gone to local governments (in the form of property and sales taxes). NATSO also argued that by destroying private commercial truck stops, the bill would result in an epidemic of drowsy truck drivers, since such stops provide about 90% of the parking spaces used by American truck drivers while in transit.

==== Service areas ====
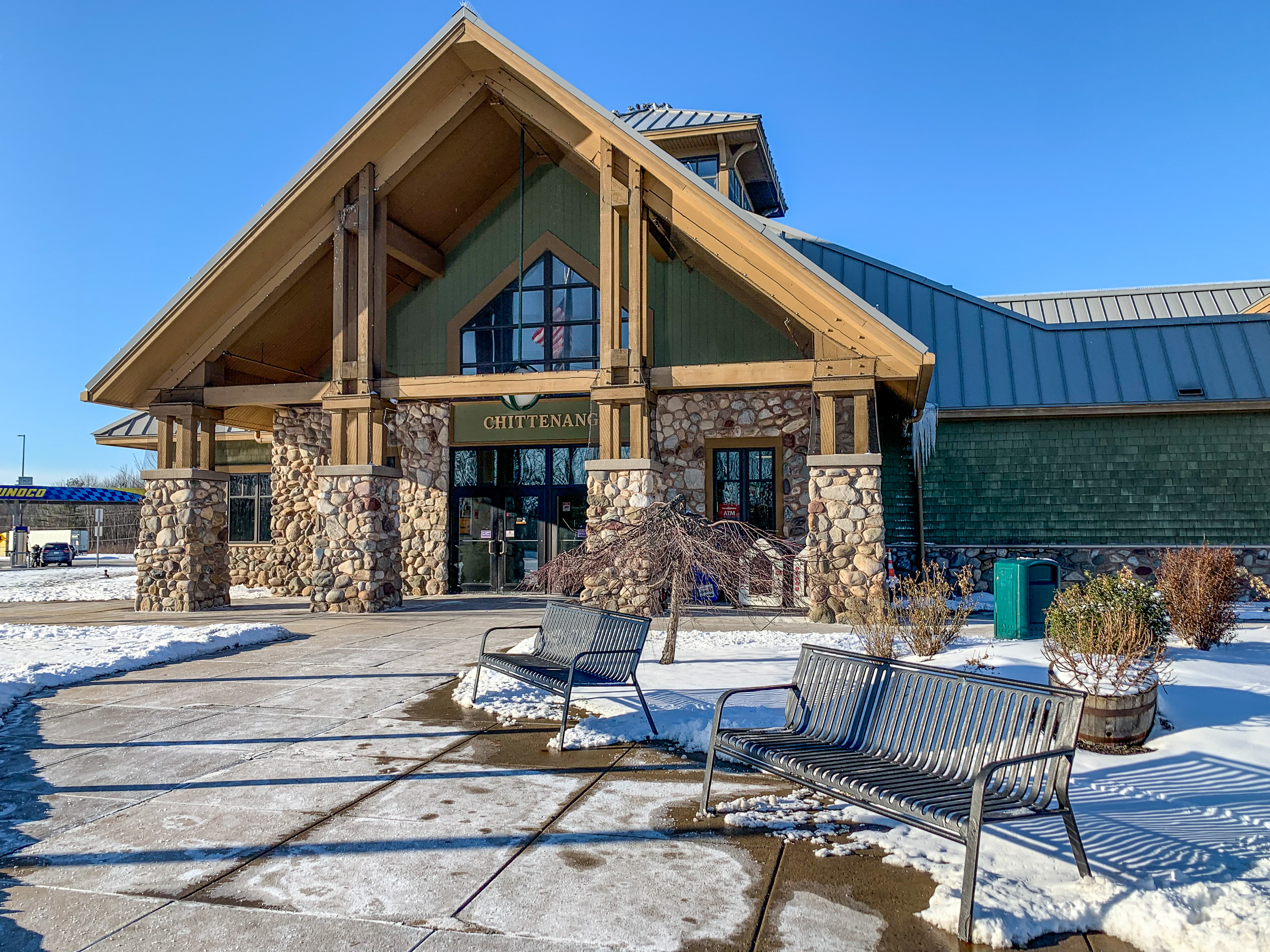
A travel plaza along Interstate 90 in Chittenango, New York

Prior to the creation of the Interstate Highway System, many states east of the Rocky Mountains had already started building and operating their own long-distance intercity toll roads (turnpikes). To help recover construction costs, most turnpike operators leased concession space at rest areas to private businesses. In addition, the use of this sort of service area allows drivers to stop for food and fuel without passing through additional tollbooths and thereby incurring a higher toll.

Pennsylvania, which opened the first such highway in 1940 with the mainline Pennsylvania Turnpike, was the model for many subsequent areas. Instead of operating the service areas themselves, the Pennsylvania Turnpike Commission opted to lease them out to Standard Oil of Pennsylvania (which was acquired shortly afterward by the modern-day Exxon), which in turn operated a filling station with a garage and Howard Johnson's franchises as a restaurant offering. The turnpike leases the filling station space to Sunoco (which operates 7-Eleven convenience stores instead of garages at the sites) and, as of 2021, the rest of the service area space to Applegreen.

In the summer of 2021, Iris Buyer LLC (an Applegreen company) announced that they were acquiring all travel plazas by HMSHost. The deal reached an agreement at the end of July 2021 officially transferring ownership. The New York State Thruway Service Areas (which will be owned by another company by Applegreen) was not affected by this transition due to the fact that Host's contract was expired. As of July 2022, Connecticut, Delaware, Indiana, Maine, Massachusetts, New Jersey, New York, Ohio, Pennsylvania, and West Virginia have service areas that are operated or have stake by Applegreen.

Some turnpikes, such as Florida's Turnpike, were never integrated into the Interstate system and never became subject to the federal ban on private businesses. On turnpikes that did become Interstates, all privatized rest areas in operation prior to January 1, 1960, were allowed to continue operating. Such facilities are often called service areas by the public and in road atlases, but each state varies:

- Connecticut, Florida, Maine, Massachusetts, Ohio, Pennsylvania, and West Virginia – service plaza
- Delaware, Kansas, Maryland, and Oklahoma – service area
- Illinois – oasis
- Indiana and New York – travel plaza
- New Jersey – service area or service plaza

Some states, such as Ohio, allow nonprofit organizations to run a concession trailer in a rest area.

Started in 2015(ish), The New Jersey Turnpike and Garden State Parkway Service Areas started advertising and selling products from Popcorn for The People. It is a non-profit organization which creates employment for people with disabilities, specifically autism.

==== Text stops ====
In 2013, the state of New York launched "It Can Wait", a program for encouraging drivers to pause at rest stops and parking areas along state roads to text (thereby avoiding texting while driving), by designating all such areas "text stops". The practice involves placing road signs which indicate the nearest "texting zone" at which to legally stop and use mobile devices such as smartphones.

==== Welcome centers ====
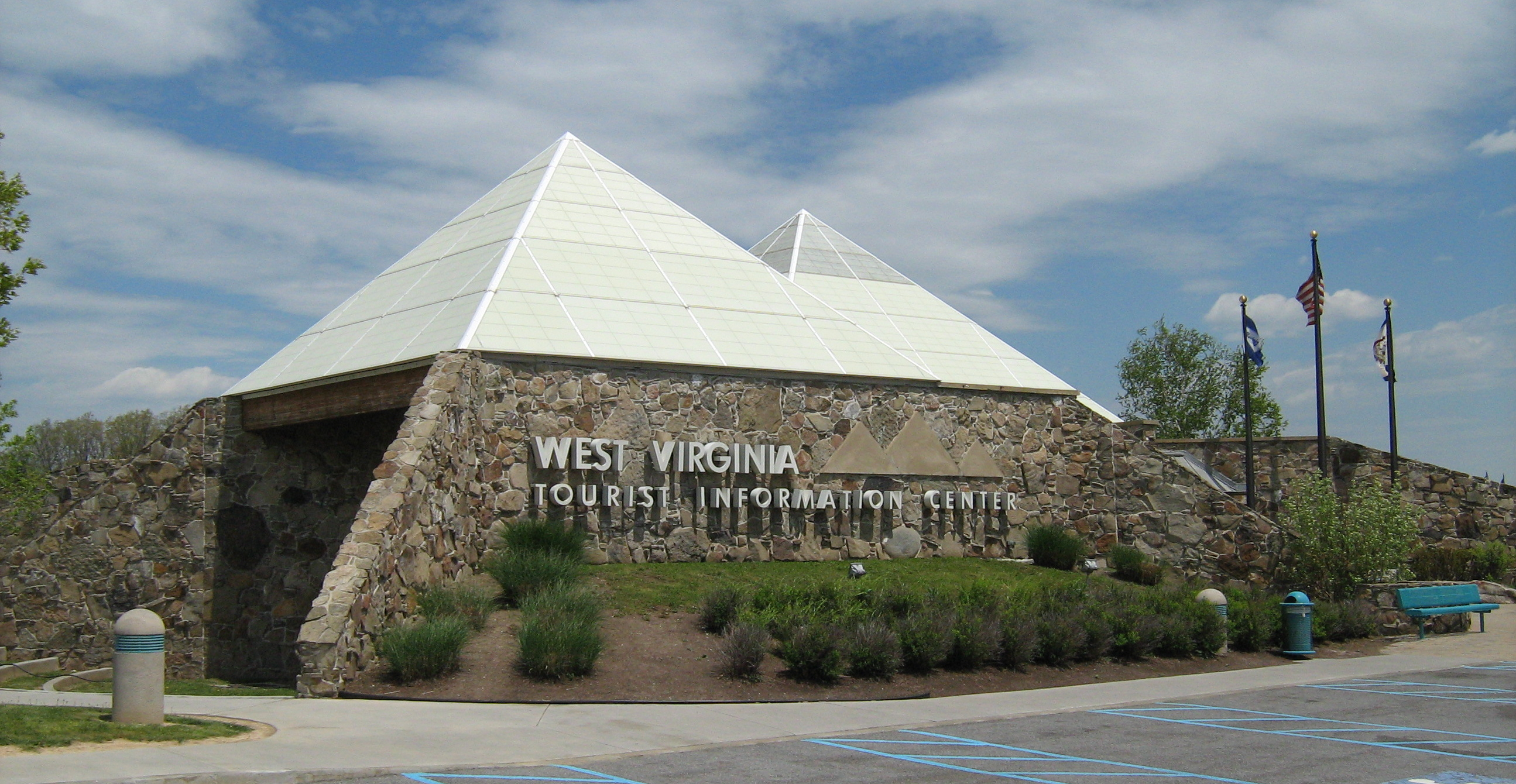
A state welcome center in West Virginia. State welcome centers are often located near state or municipal borders in the United States.

A rest area often located near state or municipal borders in the United States is sometimes called a welcome center. Welcome centers tend to be larger than regular rest areas, and are staffed at peak travel times with one or more employees who advise travelers as to their options. Some welcome centers contain a small museum or at least a basic information kiosk about the state. Because air travel has made it possible to enter and leave many states without crossing the state line at ground level, some states, like California, have official welcome centers inside major cities far from their state borders. In some states (such as Massachusetts), these rest areas are called tourist information centers and in others (such as New Jersey), visitor centers.

==== Other types ====
Rest areas without modern restrooms are called waysides. These locations have parking spaces for trucks and cars, or for semi-trailer trucks only. Some have portable toilets and waste containers. In Missouri these locations are called roadside parks or roadside tables.

The most basic parking areas have no facilities of any kind; they consist solely of a paved shoulder on the side of the highway where travelers can rest for a short time. A scenic area is similar to a parking area, but it is provided to the traveler in a place of natural beauty. These are also called scenic overlooks.

== Oceania ==
=== Australia ===
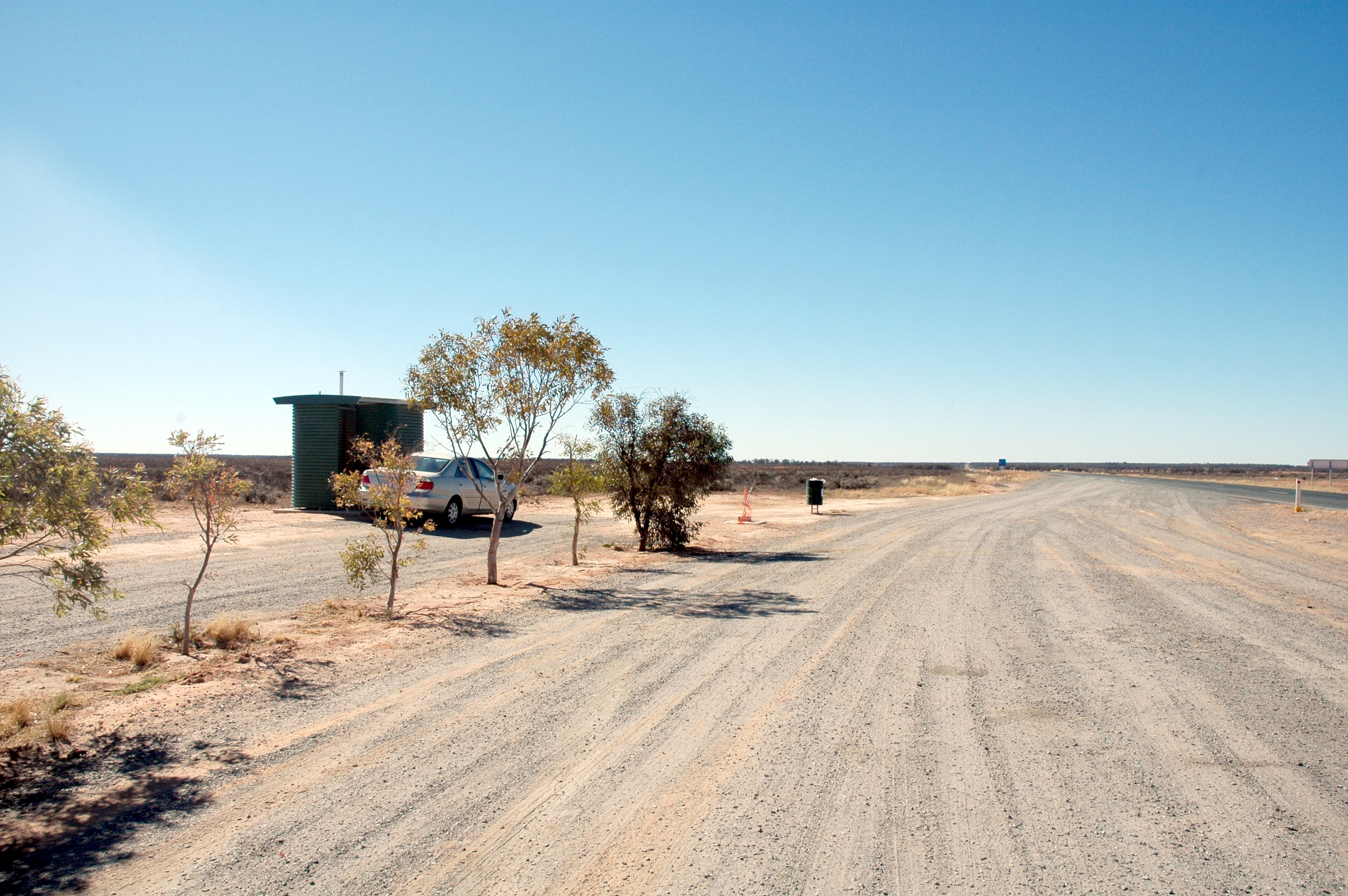
Roadside 'rest area' 20 kilometres (12 mi) north of Wentworth, New South Wales

Rest areas in Australia are a common feature of the road network in rural areas. They are the responsibility of a variety of authorities, such as a state transport or main roads bureau, or a local government's works department. Facilities and standards vary widely and unpredictably: a well-appointed rest area will have bins to deposit small items of litter, a picnic table with seating, a cold water tap (sometimes fed by a rainwater tank), barbecue fireplace (sometimes gas or electric), toilets, and – less commonly – showers. Other rest areas, especially in more remote locations, may lack some or even all of these facilities: in South Australia, a rest area may be no more than a cleared section besides the road with a sign indicating its purpose. Rest areas in Australia do not provide service stations or restaurants (such facilities would be called roadhouses or truck stops), although there may be caravans, often run by charities, providing refreshments to travellers.

Comfort and hygiene are important considerations for the responsible authorities, as such remote sites can be very expensive to clean and maintain, and vandalism is common. Also, Australia's dependence on road transport by heavy vehicles can lead to competition between the amenity needs of recreational travelers and those of the drivers of heavy vehicles—so much so that on arterial routes it is common to see rest areas specifically signed to segregate the two user groups entirely. Thus rest areas generally do not allow overnight occupation. In Queensland, however, well-maintained rest areas sometimes explicitly invite travelers to stay overnight, as a road safety measure, but this is rare elsewhere.

== See also ==
- Aid station
- Caravanserai
- Diner
- Truck stop
