= Ratl =

Middle Eastern unit of measurement

A ratl (رطل ) is a medieval Middle Eastern unit of measurement found in several historic recipes. The term was used to measure both liquid and weight (around a pound and a pint in 10th century Baghdad, but anywhere from 8 ounces to 8 pounds depending on the time period and region).

While there were a variety of names for different shapes of cups and mugs in use at the time, the ratl seems to have had a position roughly equivalent to a British pint in that the name of the drinking-vessel also implied a standardized measurement as opposed to merely the object's shape, in both 10th century Baghdad and 13th century Andalusia. However, those standardized measures varied both by region and by purpose: the spice-measuring ratl, the flax-measuring ratl, the oil-measuring ratl, and the quicksilver-measuring ratl all differed from each other.

The ratl was a part of a sequence of measurements ranging from a grain of barley through the dirham (used as a common point of reference in both medieval European and Middle Eastern regions) on up to the Sa (Islamic measure).

== measurement ==
1 Mudd = 8/6 ratl

1 Sá = 4 mudd = 5+1/3 ratl.

1 Ratl = 128+4/7 dirham or 128 dirham or 130 dirham.

1 Uqiyyah = 40 dirham.

1 Nashsh = 20 dirham.

7 mithqal = 10 dirham.

1 mithqal = 72 grains of average barely both edges cut.

1 mithqal = 20 qirat قِيراط of makkah = 21+3/7 qirat of Damascus.

1 Dirham = 0.7 mithqal =14 qirat of makkah = 15 qirat of Damascus.

1 mil = 4000 zira.

1 wasq = 60 sá.

In al-Warraq's tenth-century cookbook, different regions used some of the same terms to mean different units of measurement and the relationships between them. Some of those relationships are described below.

Unit name	Weight	Weight in dirham
Dirham	8 daniq	7 mithqal (dinar)=10 dirham
Uqiyyah	40 dirhams	
Ratl misri or fulfuli / spice measure	8 uqiyyahs	144 to 150 dirhams (Between 413 and 436 g)
Jarwi ratl / oil measure		312 dirhams (Between .9 and .95 kg)
Ratl shami	8 Baghdadi ratls (about 8 lb)	
