= Ramadan in France =

Religious observance in France

Ramadan in France is a significant religious and cultural observance, combining Islamic traditions with Western cultural practices. France is home to one of the largest Muslim populations in Europe, estimated between 6.8 and 9 million people (10–13% of the population), predominantly Sunni of Maghrebi origin.

== Observance ==
The start and end of Ramadan in France are determined by lunar observation, as in other Muslim-majority countries, often announced by Islamic organizations such as the French Council of the Muslim Faith (CFCM) and the Grand Mosque of Paris.

During this holy month, Muslims abstain from food, drink, and other physical needs from dawn to sunset, engaging in additional prayers and charitable activities.

Ramadan also serves as a communal observance. Participants engage in nightly prayers (Taraweeh) and Quran recitation. Each day concludes with Iftar, the meal breaking the fast, bringing together families and communities.

== Community engagement and charity ==
Public events such as the Paris Ramadan Festival facilitate interfaith dialogue and cultural exchange.

A central practice during Ramadan is Zakat al-Fitr, a compulsory charity given before Eid al-Fitr, the festival marking the end of fasting. Mosques and Islamic organizations in France play a key role in collecting and distributing donations. Volunteer initiatives, including food drives and free Iftar meals, foster solidarity across socioeconomic divides.

== Challenges and controversies ==
Ramadan observance in France intersects with the country's strict secular policies, creating challenges.

In 2024, the French Football Federation (FFF) faced criticism over policies perceived as limiting support for Muslim players observing Ramadan, sparking debates on religious freedom and discrimination.

In 2023, reports highlighted violations of secular rules in schools, with students and staff openly practicing religious observances. Government scrutiny increased, and in some cases disciplinary measures were applied.

Despite diplomatic tensions, the French government continued to issue visas to Algerian imams to lead Ramadan prayers.

Islamophobic incidents, including mosque vandalism and restrictions on hijab wearing, have increased, framed by debates on secularism.

Moon-sighting disputes occur as some communities follow their countries of origin, resulting in variations in Ramadan observance.
