= National Association of Truck Stop Owners =

The National Association of Truck Stop Owners, representing travel centers, truck stops and off-highway transportation energy providers, is a Washington-based trade association of more than 2,000 locations belonging to the travel plaza, truck stop and fuel retail industries. The organization lobbies the United States federal and local government to improve the business environment in which its members operate. It was formerly called the National Association of Truck Stop Operators. As a guiding force for transportation industry NATSO was founded in 1960. NATSO encourages market-oriented policies that enhance the fuel supply and refueling options for consumers and motor carriers while improving the environmental attributes of transportation energy. The association supports the ban of commercialization in state-sanctioned service plazas along toll-free roads, the establishment of the Interstate Oasis program (which designates eligible venues as an "oasis" on a sign along the Interstate), the continued federal ownership of the highway system and greater transparency on the pricing procedure of credit card fees.

NATSO has published the bimonthly Stop Watch magazine since 2011.
