= Marhala (unit) =

Marḥala (Arabic: مرحلة) was an ancient Arab unit of distance traditionally defined as the length of a day’s journey on foot or by camel under ordinary travel conditions. Estimates of its length vary, but it is generally considered to correspond to 40–45 kilometers (24.5–28 miles) in modern measurement.

The Marḥala served as a practical measure for organizing travel routes, particularly for trade caravans and pilgrimage journeys, where distances were often calculated in terms of stages or “day’s marches”. Prominent geographers such as al-Baladhuri, Yaqut al-Ḥamawi, and al-Idrisi employed the term to describe distances between cities, regions, and stations along major travel routes.

== See also ==
- Ancient Arabic units of measurement
- Arabic mile
- League: old European unit of distance
