= Qafiz =

Qafiz (Arabic: قفيز) is a traditional Arabian unit of measure for several quantities including volume, weight and area which took several different values depending on the time and region. The oldest accurate information about it is that of the qafiz of Hajjaj which equaled one Sa' of the Prophet's (4.2125 liter). It is still used in at least one country— Libya— to measure quantities of olive oil. In Libya it measures about 7 liters (almost 2 gallons). A measurement derived from it is cafisu (aka. cafiso or caffiso) and is still in use in Malta, Calabria and Sicily and is also used to measure olive oil. It generally measures 16-17 litres. Formerly a same name unit of measurement (aka cafesse) was used to measure the grain. Traditionally, qafiz, also denoted a unit for measuring land, equaling 360 square dhira' (sq. cubits).

== See also ==
- Sa'
