= Uqiyyah =

Historical unit of weight

The uqiyyah (Arabic: أُوقِيَّة), sometimes spelled awqiyyah, is the name for a historical unit of weight that varies between regions, as listed below. 1 uqiyyah= 40 dirham. 1 dirham= 0.7 dinar.

It corresponds to the historical Roman ounce and was defined in Iraq as one twelfth of a ratl or in parts of Egypt as one eighth of a ratl. As the ratl varied so did the uqiyyah as its part.

- Egypt: 37g
- Aleppo: 320g
- Beirut: 213.39g
- Jerusalem: 240g
- Malta: ~26.46 g

The same unit, pronounced okka (uqqa) in Turkish, was used in the Ottoman Empire until the early 20th century. The standard Istanbul okka equaled 128.3 g.

The ouguiya, the currency of Mauritania, takes its name from the Hassaniya Arabic pronunciation of uqiyyah.
