= Zakat al-Fitr =

Obligatory form of alms-giving in Islam

In Islam, Zakat al-Fitr or Zakat al-Fitrah (the Alms of Human Nature), is a form of charitable giving (almsgiving) that Islam requires of every able Muslim at the end of Ramadan. It consists of giving staple food to enable poor people to celebrate Eid al-Fitr, the festival marking the end of the Ramadan fast.

The obligation begins at sunset on the last day of Ramadan and continues until the start of Eid prayer on the following morning, though it may be paid earlier. Some of the Sahabah (companions of Muhammad) paid it several days before Eid al-Fitr. The required amount is the same for everyone regardless of income: one sa` (four double handfuls) of food, grain, or dried fruit per family member, or the equivalent monetary value.

== Classification ==
Zakat al-Fitr is a duty which is considered wajib (required) of every Muslim, whether male or female, minor or adult, as long as they have the means to do so.

According to Islamic tradition (Sunnah), Ibn 'Umar said that the Islamic prophet Muhammad made Zakat al-Fitr compulsory on every slave, freeman, male, female, young and old among the Muslims; one Saa` of dried dates or one Saa` of barley.

The head of the household may pay the required amount for the other members. Abu Sa'eed al-Khudree said:

On behalf of our young and old, free men and slaves, we used to take out during Allah's Messenger's (upon whom be God's peace and blessings) lifetime one Saa` of grain, cheese or raisins".

== Significance ==
The significant role played by Zakat in the circulation of wealth within the Islamic society is also played by the Sadaqat al-Fitr. However, in the case of Sadaqat al-Fitr, each individual is required to calculate how much charity is due from themselves and their dependents and go into the community in order to find those who deserve such charity. Thus, Sadaqat al-Fitr plays a very important role in the development of the bonds of community. The rich are obliged to come in direct contact with the poor, and the poor are put in contact with the extremely poor. This contact between the various levels of society helps to build real bonds of kinship and love within the Islamic community and trains those who have to be generous to those who do not have.

== Purpose ==
The main purpose of Zakat al-Fitr is to provide the poor which they can celebrate the festival of breaking the fast (`Eid al-Fitr) along with the rest of the Muslims.

Its purpose is:

1. As a levy on the fasting person. This is based on the hadith: The Prophet of Allah said, "The fasting of the month of fasting will be hanging between earth and heavens and it will not be raised up to the Divine Presence without paying the Zakat al-Fitr."
2. To purify those who fast from any indecent act or speech and to help the poor and needy.

The latter view is based upon the hadith from Ibn `Abbas who related, "The Prophet of Allah enjoined Zakat al-Fitr on those who fast to shield them from any indecent act or speech, and for the purpose of providing food for the needy. It is accepted as Zakah for the one who pays it before the `Eid prayer, and it is sadaqah for the one who pays it after the prayer."

== Conditions ==
Zakat al-Fitr is Wajib and must be distributed during a particular period of time. If one misses the time period without a good reason, they have sinned and must make it up. This form of charity becomes obligatory from sunset on the last day of fasting and remains obligatory until the beginning of Eid prayer (i.e., shortly after sunrise on the following day). However, it can be paid prior to the above-mentioned period, as many of the Sahabah (companions of Muhammad) used to pay Sadaqah al-Fitr a couple days before the `Eid.

After the spread of Islam, the jurists permitted its payment from the beginning and middle of Ramadan so as to ensure that the Zakat al-Fitr reached its beneficiaries on the day of `Eid. It is particularly emphasized that the distribution be before the `Eid prayers in order that the needy who receive are able to use the fitr to provide for their dependents on the day of `Eid.

Nafi` reported that Muhammad's companion Ibn 'Umar used to give it to those who would accept it, and the people used to give it a day or two before the `Eid.

Ibn 'Umar reported that Muhammad ordered that it (Zakat al-Fitr) be given before people go to perform the (`Eid) prayers.

One who forgets to pay this Zakat al-Fitr on time should do so as soon as possible even though it will not be counted as Zakat al-Fitr.

== Rate ==
The amount of Zakat is the same for everyone regardless of their different income brackets. The minimum amount is one sa` (four double handfuls) of food, grain or dried fruit for each member of the family. This calculation is based on Ibn 'Umar's report that Muhammad made Zakat al-Fitr compulsory and payable by a sa` of dried dates or a sa` of barley. The Hanafi school permits paying Zakat al-Fitr in the form of cash, equivalent to the above amount, while this is not permitted Maliki, Shafi'i and Hanbali schools. Using cash as a form of payment became the adopted position by many official fataw councils around the world.

A companion of Muhammed, Abu Sa`eed al-Khudree said, "In the Prophet's time, we used to give it (Zakatal-Fitr) as a sa` of food, dried dates, barley, raisins or dried cheese". (According to the majority of Sunni scholars One Sa'a is approximately between 2.6 kg to 3 kg.)

The distribution of Zakat al-Fitr is the same as that of Zakat, and is included within its broader sense. Those who may receive Zakat al-Fitr are the eight categories of recipients mentioned in Surat Al-Tawbah, [9: 60]. They include:

1. the poor,
2. the needy,
3. collectors of Zakah,
4. reconciliation of hearts,
5. freeing captives / slaves (fee al-Riqab),
6. debtors,
7. those fighting for a religious cause or a cause of God (Fī Sabīlillāh) or for Jihad in the way of Allah,
8. the traveler.

Zakat al-Fitr must go to the above-mentioned categories. The Zakat al-mal cannot be used for any other such things either.
