= Arabic mile =

Historical unit of length used by Arabs

The Arab, Arabic, or Arabian mile (Arabic: الميل, al-mīl) was a historical Arabic unit of length. Its precise length is disputed, lying between 1,800 metres (5,900 ft) and 2,000 metres (6,600 ft). It was used by medieval Arab geographers and astronomers.

The Arabian scholar Al-Farghani of the ninth century (AD) tells us that 1 mile is equal to 4000 cubits. However, there were three kinds of cubits, the "black cubit" (54.04 cm), the "legal cubit" (49.8 cm), and the surveying cubit (48.25 cm), giving respectively about 2162, 1992, or 1930 metres for the Arabian mile. If it was 1,925 meters long this was 1.04 nautical miles (1.93 km) Al-Farghani gave 20,400 miles as the circumference of the Earth in Elements of astronomy on the celestial motions (p. 31.) in 833. This would be correct for an Arabian mile of ~1.96 km, close too the values above based on the legal cubit and surveying cubit.

During the Umayyad period (661–750), the "Umayyad mile" was roughly equivalent to 2,285 metres (7,497 ft), or a little more than 2 kilometres (6,600 ft), or about 2 biblical miles, for every Umayyad mile.

== Al-Ma'mun's arc measurement ==
Around AD 830, Caliph Al-Ma'mun commissioned a group of Muslim astronomers and Muslim geographers to perform an arc measurement. The distance between two pillars whose latitudes differed by 1 degree in a north–south direction was measured using sighting pegs along a flat desert plane. One was in the Sinjar plain and the other near Kufa. Another source says from Tadmur (Palmyra, around 34°33′N 38°16′E) to Raqqa (around 35°57′N 39°01′E), in Syria. They found the cities to be separated by one degree of latitude and the corresponding meridian arc distance to be 66 2/3 Arabian miles and thus calculated the Earth's circumference to be 24,000 Arabian miles. Firuzabadi in his dictionary says that a mile equals 3000 old dhira` (ie 3000 old cubits).

Another determination by his astronomers was 56 2/3 (or 170/3) Arabian miles per degree, which corresponds to a circumference of 20,400 Arabian miles. Using the above-mentioned lengths based on the legal cubit or the surveying cubit, this is very close to the currently known values of 111.3 kilometres (69.2 mi) per degree and 40,068 kilometres (24,897 mi) circumference, respectively.

== See also ==
- Ancient Arabic units of measurement
- mile
- Biblical mile

== Bibliography ==
- Rashed, Roshdi; Morelon, Régis (1996), Encyclopedia of the History of Arabic Science, vol. 1, Routledge, ISBN 0-415-12410-7
