= Sa (Islamic measure) =

Islamic measurement of volume

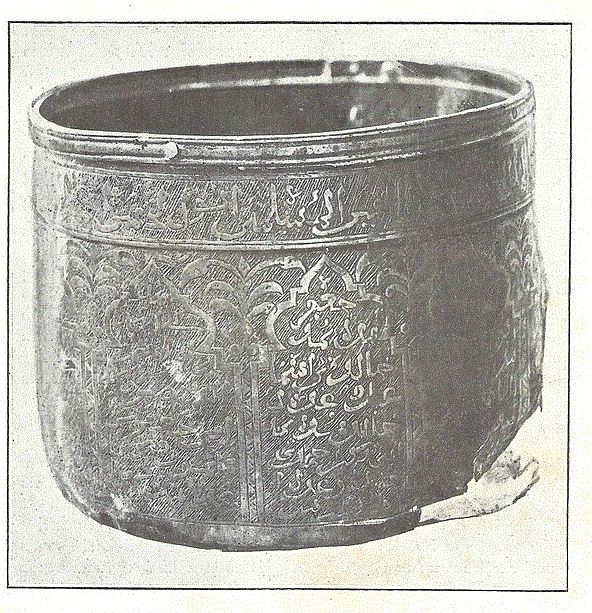
Moroccan Sāʿ-measure made of copper for measuring zakāt al-fitr from the time of Meriniden

The Sāʿ (Arabic: ص‍َاعًا and صَ‍ۡع in spelling, and sa'e in the Latin alphabet, literally: "one") is an ancient measurement of volume from the Islamic world, with cultural and religious significance. While its exact volume is uncertain, the Arabic word Sāʿ translates to "small container," related to the Quranic word ṣuwāʿ ("cup, goblet"). Together with the Mudd and the Makkūk, the Sāʿ is part of the system of units of volume used in the Arabic peninsula.

== Proportion to other Arabic measures ==
There is general agreement between medieval Arabic authors that 1 Sāʿ = 4 Mudd. The 9th-century scholar al-Khwārizmī indicates that this was the opinion of the people of Medina. Likewise, Shams al-Dīn al-Maqdisī, who lived in the 10th century, stated that in al-Ḥijāz 1 Sāʿ = 4 Mudd = 1/3 Makkūk. Az-Zahrāwī related the Sāʿ with Xestes, declaring that at the Rûm, 1 Sāʿ = 10 Xestes.

Because the Sāʿ was related to different measures of mass, many standardization problems occurred. Its relation to the Ratl was especially controversial, with two prevailing opinions:

- 1 Sāʿ = 8 Ratl was how the people of Kufa defined 1 Sāʿ. It was also the measure used by Umar (reg. 634–644) when he atoned oaths.
- 1 Sāʿ = 5 1/3 Ratl was how the people of people of Medina defined 1 Sāʿ. It was reduced to this relation by Saʿīd ibn al-ʿĀs, who was Governor of Medina under Muawiyah I (reg. 661–680).

Al-Juwayni reported that Al-Shafi‘i and also the hanafi scholar Abu Yusuf quarreled about the measurement of the Sāʿ in front of the Kalif Harun al-Rashid (reigned 786–809) at Medina. The Kalif invited the progeny of Muhajirun with their Sāʿ- Vessels, which they inherited from their ancestors. When it turned out that the measurement given by Al-Shafi‘i (1 Sāʿ = 4 Mudd = 5 1/3 Ratl) was right, Abū Yūsuf ultimately agreed with the opinion. Taking into account the fact that in Baghdad, 1 Ratl = 130 dirhams, the Muslim scholars have also established the equation: 1 Sāʿ = 693 1/3 dirhams.

== Meaning for Islamic teachings ==
Like the Mudd, the Sāʿ has an additional symbolic and religious meaning in Islam than simply a measurement. According to a hadith referred to by Anas ibn Malik in different versions and is also found in Sahih al-Bukhari, Muhammad asked God on the return from the Battle of Khaybar to bless the Sāʿ and the Mudd of the Muslims.

The Sāʿ is especially important for the measurement of the Zakat al-fitr, a beautiful alms-giving that must be done on Eid al-Fitr. This alms has the value of one Sāʿ of grain per family member. According to Islamic tradition, this value was established by Muhammad in the year 2 of the Hijra (623/624 AD). In the absence of a Mudd or Sā measure, the amount of grain for the Zakāt al-fitr can also be measured with the two hands held together; four of these double handfuls are considered equal to one Sāʿ. In Fès, the rule was that in the occasion that needy people received a larger amount of grain in the distribution of zakāt al-fitr by their neighbors, they would have to pass on the surplus to other needy people. You should only keep one Sāʿ per family member.

Special Sāʿ-measuring vessels were produced for the metering of the Zakāt al-fitr. For example, for the merinid sultan Abu al-Hasan Ali ibn Othman (reigned 1331–1351), a vessel was made from copper, which should represent the "Sāʿ of the Prophet." An inscription attached to the vessel contains a long Isnad, over which the calibration of the measuring vessel could be retraced to the prophet's companion, Zaid ibn Thabit.

Based on hadith, the Sāʿ is also considered to be the minimum amount of water that must be available to perform a valid ghusl.

Use of the Sāʿ for non-ritual purposes is recorded only in the Arabian Peninsula. Al-Maqdisī reports that the Arabs had two different Sāʿ units on the ships, a small one for compensating sailors, and a large one used for commercial transactions.

== Conversion to the metric system ==
According to Walther Hinz, who relies on the news of a Mudd calibration vessel from Ayyubid time, the "Sāʿ of the Prophet" ( ṣā' an-nabī ) is exactly 4.2125 liters. Converting this measure to the weight of wheat it is a value of 3.24 kg. The Sāʿ-vessel for the Merinid Sultan Abū l-Hasan, which was also to represent the "Sāʿ of the Prophet," has a volume of 2.75 liters.

According to students of Abdul Muhsin bin Hamad al Abbaad, the head of the department of Sharia in the Islamic University of Medina, the Majority opinion of the Fuqaha (experts in Islamic jurisprudence) is:

A Sa of raw grain is 2.3 kilograms according to the Hanbali, Maliki & Shafi'i schools of thought. A Mudd of raw grain is 510 grams according to the Hanbali, Maliki & Shafi'i schools of thought. 2.3 kilograms of grain is about 3 liters, this being the minimum amount of water to perform a valid Ghusl (full body ablution) 60 Sa = 1 Wask

The Minority opinion of the Fuqaha is: A Sa of raw grain is 3.3 kilograms according to the Hanafi school of thought.

== Literature ==
=== Arabic sources ===
- Abū-ʿUbaid al-Qāsim Ibn-Sallām: al- Amwāl. Ed. Muḥammad al-ʿAmmāra. Dār aš-Šurūq, Beirut, 1989. S. 615–627. Digitalisat
- Abū-ʿAbdallāh Muḥammad Ibn-Aḥmad al-Ḫwārizmī: Kitāb Mafātīḥ al-ʿulūm. Ed. Gerlof van Vloten. Brill, Leiden, 1895. S. 14. Digitalisat
- Šams ad-Dīn al-Maqdisī: Kitāb Aḥsan at-taqāsīm fī maʿrifat al-aqālīm. Ed. M. J. de Goeje. 2. Aufl. Brill, Leiden 1906. s. 98f. Digitalisat

=== Literature ===
- Alfred Bel: "Ṣāʿ" in Enzyklopaedie des Islam Brill, Leiden, 1913–1936. Bd. IV, S. 1. Digitalisat
- Alfred Bel: "Note sur trois anciens vases de cuivre gravé trouvés à Fès et servant à mesurer l'aumône légale du fitr." in Bulletin archéologique 1917. S. 359–387. Digitalisat
- Walther Hinz: Islamische Masse und Gewichte. Umgerechnet ins metrische System. E. J. Brill, Leiden/Köln 1970, S. 51.
- Cengiz Kellek: "Sâʿ" in Türkiye Diyanet Vakfı İslâm Ansiklopedisi Bd. XXXV, S. 317c-319c. Digitalisat
- Paul Pascon: "Description des mudd et ṣāʿ Maghribins" in Hespéris Tamuda 16 (1975) S. 25–88 Digitalisat
- M. H. Sauvaire: "Matériaux pour servir à l'histoire de la numismatique et de la métrologie musulmanes" in Journal Asiatique VIII/7 (1886) 394–417 Digitalisat.
