= History of Tunisia =

The Coat of Arms of the Republic of Tunisia

The present day Republic of Tunisia, al-Jumhuriyyah at-Tunisiyyah, is situated in Northern Africa. Geographically situated between Libya to the east, Algeria to the west and the Mediterranean Sea to the north. Tunis is the capital and the largest city (population over 800,000); it is near the ancient site of the city of Carthage.

Throughout its recorded history, the physical features and environment of the land of Tunisia have remained fairly constant, although during ancient times more abundant forests grew in the north, and earlier in prehistory the Sahara to the south was not an arid desert. (Note: Prior to 6000 years ago, evidently the vast Sahara region to the south was better watered, resembling a savanna and able to support herds; then a gradual desiccation process set in, leaving the parched desert it is today.)

The weather is temperate in the north, which enjoys a Mediterranean climate with mild rainy winters and hot dry summers, the terrain being wooded and fertile. The Medjerda river valley (Wadi Majardah, northeast of Tunis) is currently valuable farmland. Along the eastern coast the central plains enjoy a moderate climate with less rainfall but significant precipitation in the form of heavy dews; these coastlands are currently used for orchards and grazing. Near the mountainous Algerian border rises Jebel ech Chambi, the highest point in the country at 1544 meters. In the near south, a belt of salt lakes running east–west cuts across the country. Further south lies the Sahara desert, including the sand dunes of the Grand Erg Oriental.

== Early history ==
=== First peoples ===
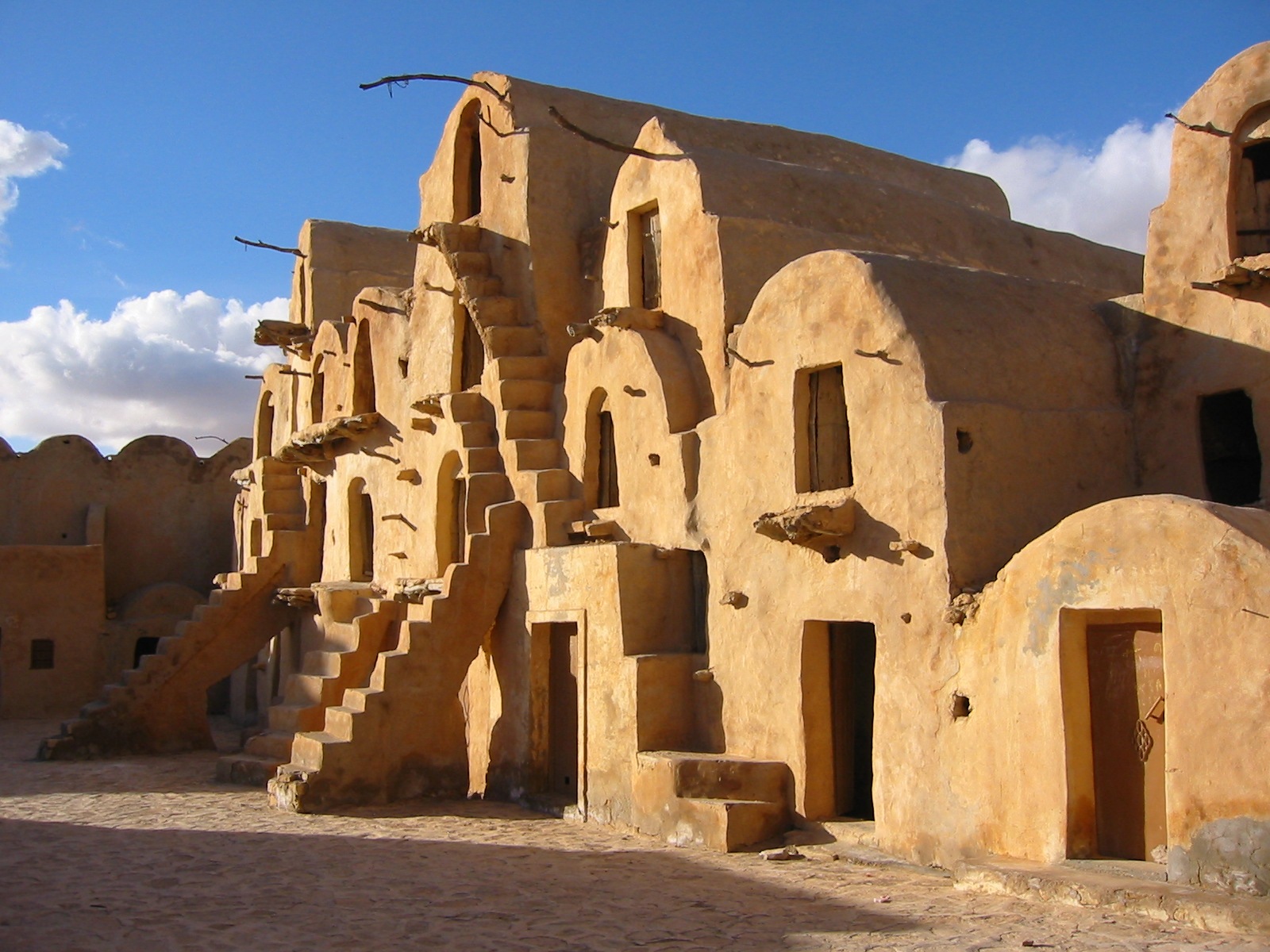
Ksar Ouled Soltane (Note: Ksar Ouled Soltane was filmed for an episode of Star Wars.) near the city of Tataouine in southern Tunisia

Stone age tools dating from the Middle Stone Age (around 200,000 years ago) found near Kelibia are the earliest evidence of human activity in the region. Finds have been made of stone blades, tools, and small figurines of the Capsian culture (named after Gafsa in Tunisia), which lasted from around 10,000 to 6,000 BC (the Mesolithic period). (Note: The Capsian culture was preceded by the Ibero-Maurusian.) Seasonal migration routes evidence their ancient journeys. Saharan rock art, consisting of inscriptions and paintings that show design patterns as well as figures of animals and of humans, are attributed to the Berbers and also to Native Africans from the south. Dating these outdoor art works has proven difficult and unsatisfactory. Egyptian influence is thought very unlikely. Among the animals depicted, alone or in staged scenes, are large-horned buffalo (the extinct bubalus antiquus), elephants, donkeys, colts, rams, herds of cattle, a lion and lioness with three cubs, leopards or cheetahs, hogs, jackals, rhinoceroses, giraffes, hippopotamus, a hunting dog, and various antelope. Human hunters may wear animal masks and carry their weapons. Herders are shown with elaborate head ornamentation; a few other human figures are shown dancing, while others are driving chariots or riding camels.

By five thousand years ago, a Neolithic culture was evolving among the sedentary proto-Berbers of the Maghrib in northwest Africa, characterized by the practice of agriculture and animal domestication, as well as the making of pottery and finely chipped stone arrowheads. They planted wheat, barley, beans and chick peas in their fields, and used ceramic bowls and basins, goblets, plates, and large cooking dishes daily. These were stored by hanging on the walls of their domiciles. Archaeological evidence shows these proto-Berbers were already "farmers with a strong pastoral element in their economy and fairly elaborate cemeteries," well over a thousand years before the Phoenicians arrived to found Carthage. Individual wealth was measured among the nomadic herders of the south by the number of sheep, goats, and cattle a man possessed. Finds of scraps of cloth woven in stripes of different colors indicate that these groups wove fabrics.

The religion of the ancient Berbers is undocumented and only funerary rites can be reconstructed from archaeological evidence. Burial sites provide an early indication of religious beliefs; almost sixty thousand tombs are located in the Fezzan alone, according to the Italian scholar Giacomo Caputo. A more recent tomb, the Medracen in eastern Algeria, still stands. Built for a Berber king and traditionally assigned to Masinissa (r. 202–149 BC), it may have belonged instead to his father Gala (or Gaia). The architecture of the elegant tower tomb of his contemporary Syphax shows Greek or Punic influence. (Note: Tomb of Syphax is at Siga near Oran.) Most other information about Berber religious beliefs comes from later, classical times. The Libyans believed that divine power showed itself in the natural world, and could, for example, inhabit bodies of water or reside in stones, which were objects of worship. Procreative power was symbolized by the bull, the lion, and the ram. Among the proto-Berbers in the area that is now Tunisia, images of fish, often found in mosaics excavated there, were phallic symbols that fended off the evil eye, while sea shells signified the female sex. Herodotus mentions that Libyans of the Nasamone tribe slept on the graves of their ancestors in order to induce dreams for divination. Libyans sacrificed to the sun and to the moon (Ayyur). Eventually supernatural entities became personalized as gods, perhaps influenced by Egyptian or Punic practice; yet the Berbers seemed to be "drawn more to the sacred than to the gods." Often only a little more than the names of the Berber deities are known, e.g., Bonchar, a leading god. (Note: There is a third century A.D. relief from ancient Vaga (now Béja, Tunisia), with Latin inscription, which shows seven Berber gods (the Dii Mauri or Mauran gods) seated on a bench: Bonchar in the center with a staff (master of the pantheon), to his right sits the goddess Vihina with an infant at her feet (childbirth?), to her right is Macurgum holding a scroll and a serpent entwined staff (health?), to Bonchar's left is Varsissima (without attributes), and to her left is Matilam evidently presiding over the sacrifice of a boar; at. the ends are Macurtan holding a bucket and Iunam (moon?).) Eventually, Berbero-Libyans came to adopt elements from ancient Egyptian religion. Herodotus writes of the divine oracle sourced in the Egyptian god Ammon located among the Libyans, at the oasis of Siwa. (Note: The Libyan oracle was sister to the divine oracle of Dodona in Greece) Later, Berber beliefs influenced the Punic religion of Carthage, the city-state founded by the Phoenicians.

G20 SA A wA A SA A T14 A1 Z2
Meshwesh (mšwš.w)
in hieroglyphs

Egyptian hieroglyphs from the early dynasties also testify to Libyans, the Berbers of the "western desert". (Note: The Palermo Stone (named for the Museo Archeologico Regionale in Palermo, where much of it is kept), also called the Libyan Stone, contains a list of the earliest pharaohs up to the Fifth dynasty of Egypt (2487–2348) as well as about fifty prior rulers. Some consider these fifty earlier rulers to be Libyan Berbers, from whom the pharaohs derived. Helene F. Hagan, "Book Review" Archived 2008-12-09 at the Wayback Machine of Brett and Fentress, The Berbers (1996), at paragraph "a".) First mentioned as the Tehenou during the pre-dynastic reigns of Scorpion II (c. 3050) and of Narmer (on an ivory cylinder), their appearance is later disclosed in a bas relief of the Fifth Dynasty temple of Sahure. Ramses II (r. 1279–1213) placed Libyan contingents in his army. Tombs of the 13th century BC show paintings of Libu leaders wearing fine robes, with ostrich feathers in their "dreadlocks", short pointed beards, and tattoos on their shoulders and arms. Evidently, Osorkon the Elder (Akheperre setepenamun), a Berber of the Meshwesh tribe, became the first Libyan pharaoh. Several decades later, his nephew Shoshenq I (r. 945–924) became Pharaoh of Egypt, and the founder of its Twenty-second Dynasty (945–715). (Note: In 818 the ruling Bubastid house split, both of its Berber Meshwesh branches continuing to rule, one later called the 23rd Dynasty.) (Note: Almost two millennia later a Fatimid Berber army would again occupy Egypt from the west, and establish a dynasty there.) In 926 Shoshenq I (thought to be Shishak of the Bible) successfully campaigned to Jerusalem then ruled by Solomon's heir. For several centuries Egypt was governed by a decentralized system based on the Libyan tribal organization of the Meshwesh. Becoming acculturated, Libyans also served as high priests at Egyptian religious centers. Hence during the classical era of the Mediterranean, all of the Berber peoples of Northwest Africa were often known collectively as Libyans.

Farther west, foreigners knew some Berbers as Gaetulians (who lived in remote areas), and those Berbers more familiar as the Numidians, and as the Mauri or Maurisi (later the Moors). (Note: Yet these names (Mauri from which Moor) have been used by ancient and medieval authors to designate also black Africans coming from south of the Sahara. Frank M. Snowden, Jr., Blacks in Antiquity: Ethiopians in the Greco-Roman Experience (Harvard University 1970) pp. 11–14.) These Berber peoples interacted with Phoenicia and Carthage (who also used the name "Libyphoenicians"), and later with Rome. Yet prior to this era of history, sedentary rural Berbers apparently lived in semi-independent farming villages, composed of small tribal units under a local leader. Yet seasonally they might leave to find pasture for their herds and flocks. Modern conjecture is that robust feuding between neighborhood clans kept Berber political organization from rising above the village level, yet the military threat from the city-state of Carthage would inspire Berber villages to join in order to marshall large-scale armed forces under a strong leader. Social techniques from the nearby polity of Carthage were adopted and modified for Berber use. A bilingual (Punic and Berber) urban inscription of the 2nd century BC from Berber Numidia, specifically from the city of Thugga (modern Dougga, Tunisia), indicates a complex city administration, with the Berber title GLD (corresponding to modern Berber Aguellid, or paramount tribal chief) being the ruling municipal office of the city government; this office apparently rotated among the members of leading Berber families. Circa 220 BC, in the early light given us by historical accounts, three large kingdoms had arisen among the Berbers of Northwest Africa (west to east): (1) the Mauri (in modern Morocco) under king Baga; (2) the Masaesyli (in northern Algeria) under Syphax who ruled from two capitals, Siga (near modern Oran) and to the east Cirta (modern Constantine); and (3) the Massyli (south of Cirta, west and south of Carthage) ruled by Gala, father of Masinissa. Later Masinissa would receive full honors befitting an important leader from both Roman and Hellenic states. Berber ethnic identities were maintained during the long periods of dominance by Carthage and Rome.

During the first centuries of the Islamic era, it was said that the Berber tribes were divided into two blocs, the Butr (Zanata and allies) and the Baranis (Sanhaja, Masmuda, and others). The etymology of these names is unclear, perhaps deriving from tribal customs for clothing ("abtar" and "burnous"), or perhaps distinguishing the nomad (Butr) from the farmer (Baranis). The Arabs drew most of their early recruits from the Butr. (Note: Singular of Baranis is Burnus, from which burnous, understood as a long garment. "Abtar" signifies cut short, hence a short tunic. E.F.Gautier is cited for his conjecture regarding farmers and nomads.) Later, legends arose of an obscure, ancient invasion of Northwest Africa by the Himyarite Arabs of Yemen, from which a prehistoric ancestry was evidently fabricated: Berber descent from two brothers, Burnus and Abtar, who were sons of Barr, the grandson of Canaan (Canaan being the grandson of Noah through his son Ham). Both Ibn Khaldun (1332–1406) and Ibn Hazm (994–1064) as well as Berber genealogists held that the Himyarite Arab ancestry was totally unacceptable. This legendary ancestry, however, played a role in the long Arabization process that. continued for centuries among the Berber peoples. (Note: See below, section Berber Role per the Umayyad Conquest of Ifriqiya.)

In their medieval Islamic history the Berbers may be divided into three major tribal groups: the Zanata, the Sanhaja, and the Masmuda. (Note: The tribal divisions are taken from Ibn Khaldun (1332–1406). Abun-Nasr remarks that "[T]hese divisions do not seem to coincide entirely either with the ethnic groupings or distinctions of dialect.") The Zanata early on allied more closely with the Arabs and consequently became more Arabized, although Znatiya Berber is still spoken in small islands across Algeria and in northern Morocco (the Rif and north Middle Atlas). The Sanhaja are also widely dispersed throughout the Maghrib, among which are: the sedentary Kabyle on the coast west of modern Algiers, the nomadic Zanaga of southern Morocco (the south Anti-Atlas) and the western Sahara to Senegal, and the Tuareg (al-Tawarik), the well-known camel breeding nomads of the central Sahara. The descendants of the Masmuda are sedentary Berbers of Morocco, in the High Atlas, and from Rabat inland to Azru and Khanifra, the most populous of the modern Berber regions.

Medieval events in Ifriqiya and al-Maghrib often have tribal associations. Linked to the Kabyle Sanhaja were the Kutama tribes, whose support helped to establish the Fatimid Caliphate (909–1171, only until 1049 in Ifriqiya); their vassals and later successors in Ifriqiya the Zirids (973–1160) were also Sanhaja. The Almoravids (1056–1147) first began far south of Morocco, among the Lamtuna Sanhaja. From the Masmuda came Ibn Tumart and the Almohad movement (1130–1269), later supported by the Sanhaja. Accordingly, it was from among the Masmuda that the Hafsid dynasty (1227–1574) of Tunis originated.

=== Migrating peoples ===
The historical era opens with the advent of traders coming by sea from the eastern Mediterranean. Eventually they were followed by a stream of colonists, landing and settling along the coasts of Africa and Iberia, and on the islands of the western seas.

The Neolithic Revolution brought technological innovations and economic development in the eastern Mediterranean, Mesopotamia, and along the Nile, increased the demand for various metals not found locally in sufficient quantity. Phoenician traders recognized the relative abundance and low cost of the needed metals among the goods offered for trade by local merchants in Hispania, which spurred trade. In the Phoenician city-state of Tyre, much of this Mediterranean commerce, as well as the corresponding trading settlements located at coastal stops along the way to the west, were directed by the kings, e.g., Hiram of Tyre (969–936).

By three thousand years ago the Levant and Hellas had enjoyed remarkable prosperity, resulting in population growth in excess of their economic base. On the other hand, political instability from time to time caused disruption of normal business and resulted in short-term economic distress. City-states started organizing their youth to migrate in groups to locations where the land was less densely settled. Importantly, the number of colonists coming from Greece was much larger than those coming from Phoenicia.

To these migrants, lands in the western Mediterranean presented an opportunity and could be reached relatively easily by ship, without marching through foreign territory. Colonists sailed westward following in the wake of their commercial traders. The Greeks arrived later, coming to (what is now) southern France, southern Italy including Sicily, and eastern Libya. Earlier the Phoenicians had settled in (what is now) Sardinia, Spain, Morocco, Algeria, Sicily, and Tunisia. In Tunisia the city of Carthage was founded, which would come to rule all the other Phoenician settlements.

Throughout Tunisia's history many peoples have arrived among the Berbers to settle: most recently the French along with many Italians, before them came the Ottoman Turks with their multi-ethnic rule, yet earlier the Arabs who brought their language and the religion of Islam, and its calendar; (Note: The Islamic calendar starts on July 16, 622 A.D., an estimated day for Muhammad's flight (Hijra) from Mecca to Medina. Years in this calendar are designated A.H. for Anno Hegira or the Hijri year. Since the Islamic calendar is strictly lunar, it runs about eleven and one-quarter days shorter than a solar year; hence calculation of dates between this lunar and a solar calendar are complicated. The calendar used in this article is a solar calendar, the traditional western calendar, or the Gregorian, with the years dating from an approximate birth date of Jesus, designated either B.C. for Before Christ, or A.D. for Anno Domini. Alternatively the western calendar can be renamed to sanction a secular modernism, a nominal neutrality, or otherwise, the years being called B.C.E. and C.E., for Common Era. For prehistory, the kya (thousands of years ago) notation is more often employed.) before them arrived the Byzantines, and the Vandals. Over two thousand years ago came the Romans, whose Empire long governed the region. The Phoenicians founded Carthage close to three thousand years ago. Also came migrations from the Sahel region of Africa. Perhaps eight millennia ago, already there were peoples established among whom the proto-Berbers (coming from the east) mingled, and from whom the Berbers would spring, during an era of their ethno-genesis.

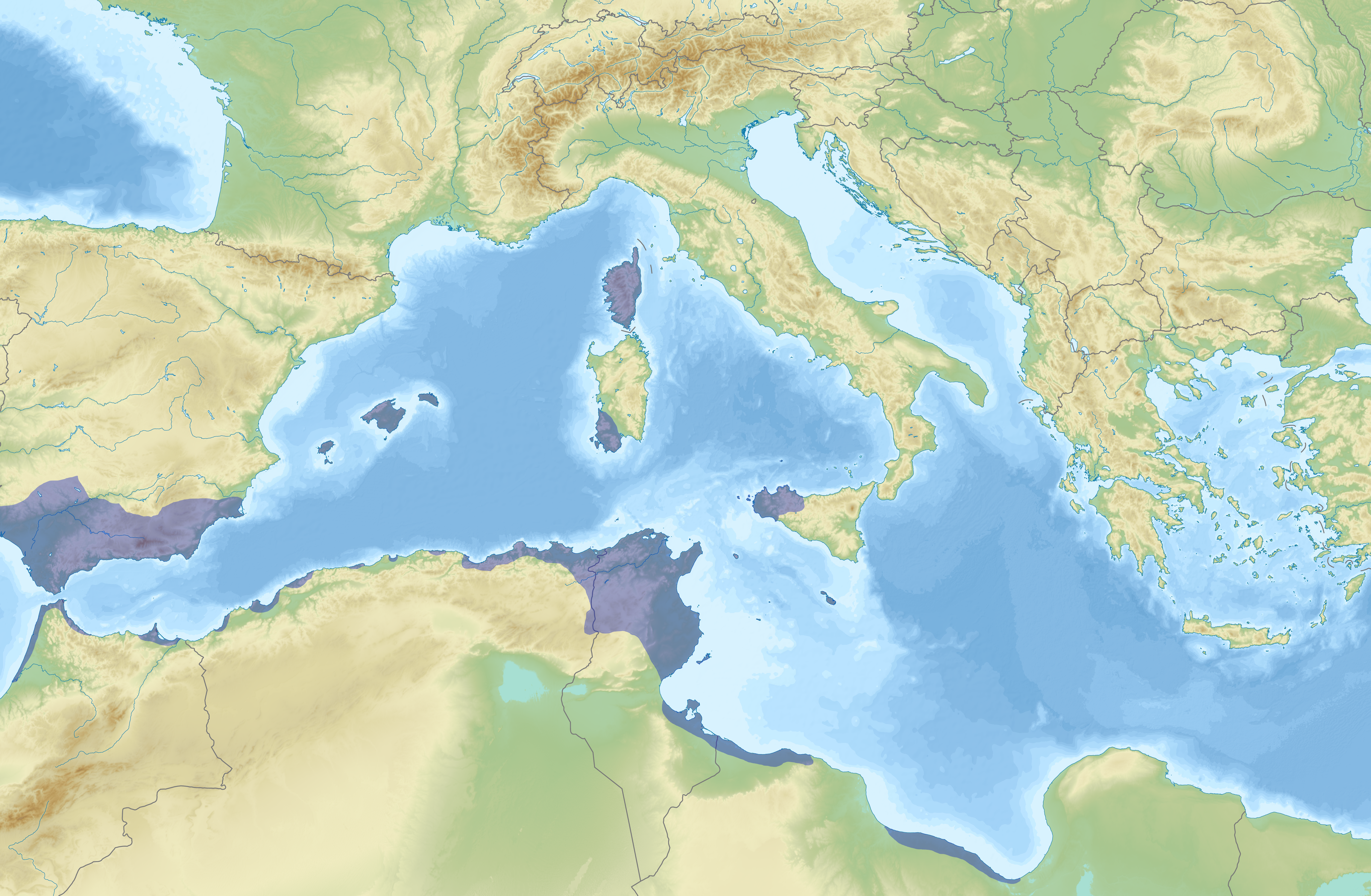
The city-state of Carthage and territories under its political or commercial influence, circa 264 BC

== Carthage ==
=== Foundation ===
The city of Carthage (site of its ruins near present-day Tunis) was founded by Phoenicians coming from the eastern Mediterranean coast. Its name, pronounced Qart Hadesht in the Punic language that meant "new city" (It's cognate with Arabic, "Qarya Ħadītha", lit: "Modern Village/City). (Note: Here qart meant "city" (cognate with Arabic "Qarya"), ħadesht "new" (cognate with Arabic "Ħadītha). Note that Qart-Ħadesht is pronounced Carchedon (Καρχήδόν) in ancient Greek.) The Punic idiom is a Canaanite language, in the group of Northwest Semitic languages.

Timaeus of Taormina, a third century BC Greek historian from Sicily, gives the date of the founding of Carthage as thirty-eight years before the first Olympiad (776 BC), which in today's calendar would be the year 814 BC. Timaeus in Sicily was proximous to Cathaginians and their version of the city's foundation; his date is generally accepted as approximate. (Note: Noting that the Greek city of Cumae was founded in Italy shortly thereafter.) Ancient authors, such as Sallust and Pliny the Elder, give founding dates several hundred years earlier for other Phoenician cities in the western Mediterranean, such as Utica and Gades, but recent archeology has been unable to verify these earlier dates.

It was Tyre, a major maritime city-state of Phoenicia, which first settled Carthage, probably in order to enjoy a permanent station there for its ongoing trade. Legends alive in the African city for centuries assigned its foundation to a queen of Tyre, Elissa, also called Dido. (Note: Queen Elissa (Dido) would be related to Jezebel of the Bible. David Soren, Aicha Ben Abed Ben Khader, Hedi Slim, Carthage. Uncovering the Mysteries and Splendors of Ancient Tunisia (New York: Simon & Schuster 1990) pp. 21, 24. Jezebel was the Phoenician wife of Ahab, King of Israel (c.875–854).) The Roman historian Pompeius Trogus, a near contemporary of Virgil, describes a sinister web of court intrigue which caused Queen Elissa (Dido) to flee the city of Tyre westward with a fleet of ships. The Roman poet Virgil (70–19 BC) portrays Dido as the tragic, admirable heroine of his epic the Aeneid, which contains many inventions loosely based on legendary history, and includes the story about how the Phoenician queen acquired the Byrsa.

=== Sovereignty ===
By the middle of the sixth century BC, Carthage had grown into a fully independent thalassocracy. Under Mago (r., c.550–530) and later his Magonid family, Carthage became preeminent among the Phoenician colonies in the western Mediterranean, which included nearby Utica.

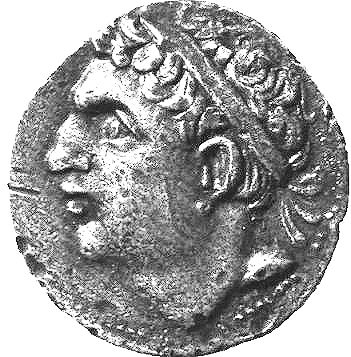
Hasdrubal of Carthage, younger brother of Hannibal (247–c.182)

Trading partnerships were established among the Numidian Berbers to the west along the African coast as well as to the east in Libya; other stations were located in southern Sardinia and western Sicily, Ibiza in the Balearics, Lixus south of the straits, and Gades north of the straits, with additional trading stations in the south and east of Iberia. Also, Carthage enjoyed an able ally in the Etruscans, who then ruled a powerful state to the north of the infant city of Rome.

A merchant sailor of Carthage, Himilco, explored in the Atlantic to the north of the straits, along the coast of the Lusitanians and perhaps as far as Oestrymnis (modern Brittany), circa 500 BC. Carthage would soon supplant the Iberian city of Tartessus in carrying the tin trade from Oestrymnis. Another, Hanno the Navigator explored the Atlantic to the south, along the African coast well past the River Gambia. The traders of Carthage were known to be secretive about business and particularly about trade routes; it was their practice to keep the straits to the Atlantic closed to the Greeks.

In the 530s there had been a three sided naval struggle between the Phoenicians, the Greeks, and the Etrusco-Punic allies; the Greeks lost Corsica to the Etruscans and Sardinia to Carthage. Then the Etruscans attacked Greek colonies in the Campania south of Rome, but unsuccessfully. As an eventual result, Rome threw off their Etruscan kings of the Tarquin dynasty. The Roman Republic and Carthage in 509 entered into a treaty which set out to define their commercial zones.

=== Greek rivalry ===
The energetic presence of Greek traders and their emporia in the Mediterranean region led to disputes over commercial spheres of influence, especially in Sicily. This Greek threat, plus the foreign conquest of Phoenicia in the Levant, had caused many Phoenician colonies to come under the leadership of Carthage. In 480 BC (concurrent with Persia's invasion of Greece), Mago's grandson Hamilcar landed a large army in Sicily in order to confront Syracuse (a colony of Corinth) on the island's eastern coast, but the Greeks prevailed at the Battle of Himera. A long struggle ensued with intermittent warfare between Syracuse led by e.g., the tyrant Dionysius I (r.405–367), and Carthage led by e.g., Hanno I the Great. Later, near Syracuse Punic armies defeated the Greek leader Agathocles (r.317–289) in battle, who then attempted a bold strategic departure by leaving Sicily and landing his forces at Cape Bon near Carthage, frightening the city. Yet Carthage again defeated Agathocles (310–307). Greece, preoccupied with its conquest of the Persian Empire in the east, eventually became supplanted in the western Mediterranean by Rome, the new rival of Carthage.

All this while Carthage enlarged its commercial sphere, venturing south to develop the Saharan trade, augmenting its markets along the African coast, in southern Iberia, and among the Mediterranean islands, and exploring in the far Atlantic. Carthage also established its authority directly among the Numidian Berber peoples in the lands immediately surrounding the city, which grew ever more prosperous.

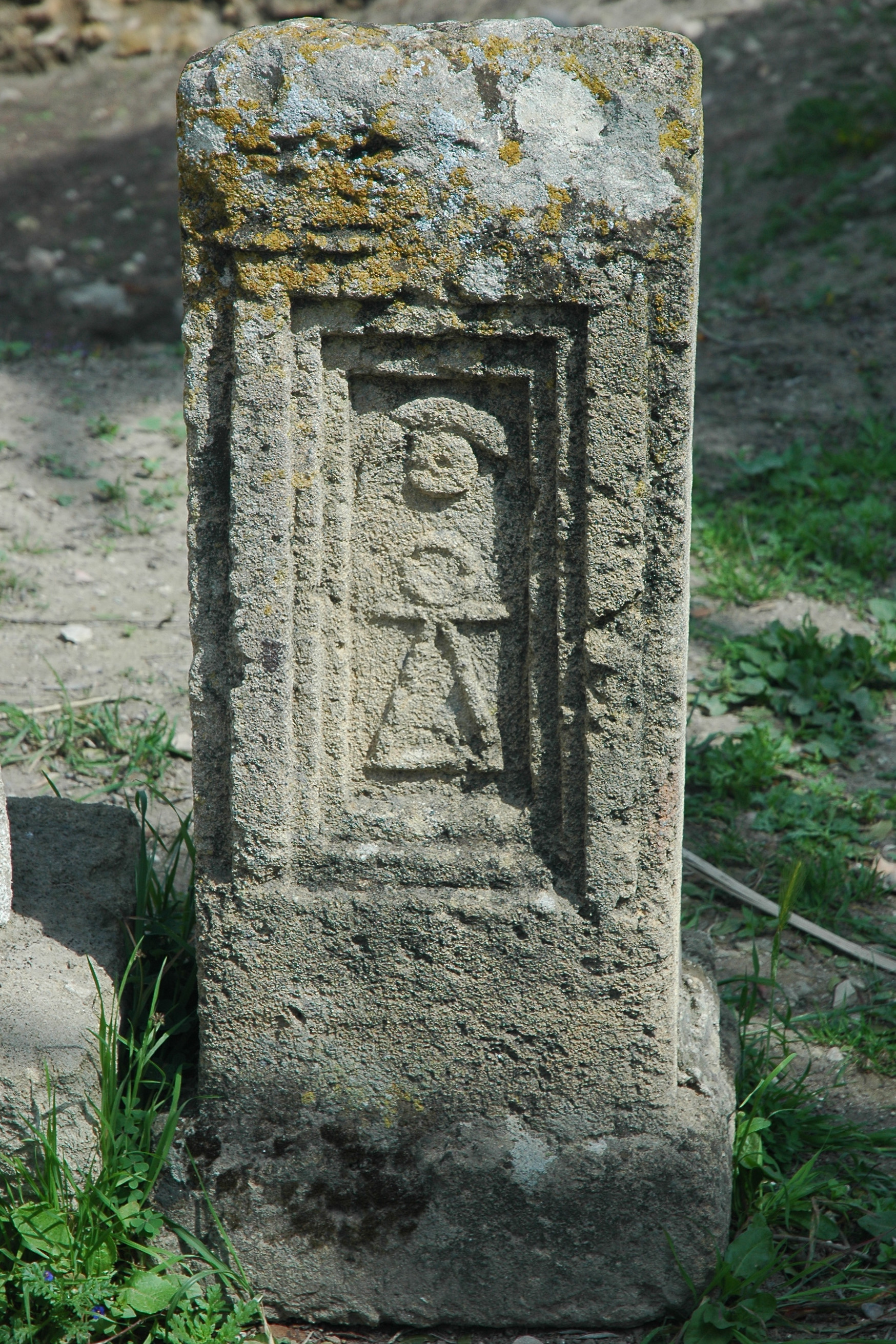
Tophet funerary stelae, showing (below moon and sun) a symbol of Tanit, queen goddess of Carthage

=== Religion of Carthage ===
The Phoenicians of Tyre brought their lifestyle and inherited customs with them to Northwest Africa. Their religious practices and beliefs were generally similar to those of their neighbors in Canaan, which in turn shared characteristics common throughout the ancient Semitic world. Several aspects of Canaanite religion have been widely criticized, particularly temple prostitution and child sacrifice. Canaanite religious sense and mythology do not appear as elaborated or developed as those of Mesopotamia. In Canaan the supreme god was called El, which means "god" in common Semitic. The important storm god was called Baal, which means "master". Other gods were called after royalty, e.g., Melqart means "king of the city".

The gods of the Semitic pantheon that were worshipped would depend on the identity of the particular city-state or tribe. (Note: Eshmun the god of healing was the chief god of Sidon, Dagon (whose son was Baal) of Ashdod, the rejuvenating Melqart of Tyre, Terah the moon god of the Zebulon, while in Mesopotamia the moon god was Sin (called Nanna at Ur), the fertility goddess of Uruk being Ishtar, the great. god of Babylon being Marduk. Brandon (ed.), Dictionary of Comparative Religion re "Canaanite Religion" p. 173, "Phoenician Religion" p. 501; Richard Carlyon, A Guide to the Gods (New York 1981) pp. 311, 315, 320, 324, 326, 329, 332, 333.) After being transplanted to Africa far from its regional origins, and after co-existing with the surrounding Berber tribes, the original Phoenician pantheon and ways of worship evolved distinctly over time at the city-state of Carthage. (Note: See also: Punic religion)

=== Constitution of Carthage ===
The government of Carthage was undoubtedly patterned after the Phoenician, especially the mother city of Tyre, but Phoenician cities had kings and Carthage apparently did not. (Note: This discussion first follows Warmington in essence, then turns to Charles-Picard's substantially different results.) An important office was called in Punic the Suffets (a Semitic word agnate with the Old Hebrew Shophet usually translated as Judges as in the Book of Judges). Yet the Suffet at Carthage was more the executive leader, but as well served in a judicial role. Birth and wealth were the initial qualifications. (Note: A circa 2nd century B.C. bilingual inscription from Thugga (modern Dougga, Tunisia), describes Berber political office holders and indicates some influence by Carthage on Berber state institutions.) It appears that the Suffet was elected by the citizens, and held office for a one-year term; probably there were two of them at a time; hence quite comparable to the Roman Consulship. A crucial difference was that the Suffet had no military power. Carthaginian generals marshalled mercenary armies and were separately elected. From about 550 to 450 the Magonid family monopolized the top military position; later the Barcid family acted similarly. Eventually it came to be that, after a war, the commanding general had to testify justifying his actions before a court of 104 judges.

Aristotle (384–322, Greek) discusses Carthage in his Politica describing the city as a "mixed constitution", a political arrangement with cohabiting elements of monarchy, aristocracy, and democracy. Later Polybus of Megalopolis (c.204–122, Greek) in his Histories would describe the Roman Republic as a mixed constitution in which the Consuls were the monarchy, the Senate the aristocracy, and the Assemblies the democracy.

Evidently Carthage also had an institution of elders who advised the Suffets, similar to the Roman Senate. We do not have a name for this body. At times members would travel with an army general on campaign. Members also formed permanent committees. The institution had several hundred members from the wealthiest class who held office for life. Vacancies were probably filled by co-option. From among its members were selected the 104 Judges mentioned above. Later the 104 would come to judge not only army generals but other office holders as well. Aristotle regarded the 104 as most important; he compared it to the ephorate of Sparta with regard to control over security. In Hannibal's time, such a Judge held office for life. At some stage there also came to be independent self-perpetuating boards of five who filled vacancies and supervised (non-military) government administration.

Popular assemblies also existed at Carthage. When deadlocked the Suffets and the quasi-senatorial institution might request the assembly to vote, or in very crucial matters in order to achieve political coherence. The assembly members had no legal wealth or birth qualification. How its members were selected is unknown, e.g., whether by festival group or urban ward or another method.

The Greeks were favorably impressed by the constitution of Carthage; Aristotle had a study of it made which unfortunately is lost. In the brief approving review of it found in his Politica Aristotle saw one fault: that focus on pursuit of wealth led to oligarchy. So it was in Carthage. The people were politically passive; popular rights came late. Being a commercial republic fielding a mercenary army, the people were not conscripted for military service, an experience which can foster the feel for popular political action. On the other hand, Carthage was very stable; there were few openings for tyrants. "The superiority of their constitution is proved by the fact that the common people remain loyal," noted Aristotle. Only after defeat by Rome devastated Carthage's imperial ambitions did the people express interest in reform

In 196, following the Second Punic War, Hannibal, still greatly admired as a Barcid military leader, was elected Suffet. When his reforms were blocked by a financial official about to become a Judge for life, Hannibal rallied the populace against the 104 Judges. He proposed a one-year term for the 104, as part of a major civic overhaul. His political opponents cravenly went to Rome and charged Hannibal with conspiracy, with plotting war against Rome in league with Antiochus the Hellenic ruler of Syria. Although Scipio Africanus resisted such maneuver, eventually Roman intervention forced Hannibal to leave Carthage. Thus corrupt officials of Carthage efficiently blocked Hannibal's efforts at reform.

The above description of the constitution basically follows Warmington. Largely it is taken from descriptions by Greek foreigners who likely would see in Carthage reflections of their own institutions. How strong was the Hellenizing influence within Carthage? The basic difficulty is the lack of adequate writings due to the secretive nature of the Punic state as well as to the utter destruction of the capital city and its records. Another view of the constitution of Carthage is given by Charles-Picard as follows.

Mago (6th century) was King of Carthage, Punic MLK or malik (Greek basileus), not merely a SFT or Suffet, which then was only a minor official. Mago as MLK was head of state and war leader; being MLK was also a religious office. His family was considered to possess a sacred quality. Mago's office was somewhat similar to that of Pharaoh, but although kept in a family it was not hereditary, it was limited by legal consent; however, the council of elders and the popular assembly are late institutions. Carthage was founded by the King of Tyre who had a royal monopoly on this trading venture. Accordingly, royal authority was the traditional source of power the MLK of Carthage possessed. Later, as other Phoenician ship companies entered the trading region, and so associated with the city-state, the MLK of Carthage had to keep order among a rich variety of powerful merchants in their negotiations over risky commerce across the seas. The office of MLK began to be transformed, yet it was not until the aristocrats of Carthage became landowners that a council of elders was institutionalized.

=== Punic Wars with Rome ===
The emergence of the Roman Republic and its developing foreign interests led to sustained rivalry with Carthage for dominion of the western Mediterranean. As early as 509 BC Carthage and Rome had entered into treaty status, but eventually their opposing positions led to disagreement, alienation, and conflict.

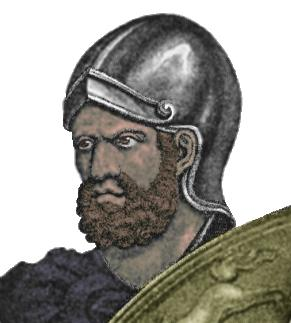
Modern engraving of Hannibal, based on marble bust found at Capua, said to have been made during his lifetime. Museo Nazionale, Naples.

The First Punic War (264–241 BC) started in Sicily. It developed into a naval war in which the Romans learned how to fight at sea and prevailed. Carthage lost Sardinia and its western portion of Sicily. Following their defeat, the Mercenary revolt threatened the social order of Carthage, which they survived under their opposing leaders Hanno II the Great, and Hamilcar Barca, father of Hannibal.

The Second Punic War (218–201 BC) started over a dispute concerning Saguntum (near modern Valencia) in Hispania, from whence Hannibal set out, leading his armies over the Alps into Italy. At first Hannibal ("grace of Baal") won great military victories against Rome, at Trasimeno (217 BC) and at Cannae (216 BC), which came close to destroying Rome's ability to wage war. Yet the majority of Rome's Italian allies remained loyal; Rome drew on all her resources and managed to rebuild her military strength. For many years Hannibal remained on campaign in southern Italy. An attempt in 207 BC by his brother Hasdrubal to reinforce him failed. Meanwhile, Roman armies were contesting Carthage for the control of Hispania, in 211 BC the domain of armies under Hannibal's three brothers (Hasdrubal and Mago), and Hasdrubal Gisco; by 206 BC the Roman general Cornelius Scipio (later Africanus) had defeated Punic power there. In 204 BC Rome landed armies at Utica near Carthage, which forced Hannibal's return. One Numidian king, Syphax, supported Carthage. Another, Masinissa, Rome. At the Battle of Zama in 202 BC the same Roman general Scipio Africanus defeated Hannibal, ending the long war. Carthage lost its trading cities in Hispania and elsewhere in the Western Mediterranean, and much of its influence over the Numidian Kingdoms in Northwest Africa. Carthage became reduced to its immediate surroundings. Also, it was required to pay a large indemnity to Rome. Carthage revived, causing great alarm in Rome.

The Third Punic War (149–146 BC) began following the refusal by Carthage to alter the terms of its agreement with Rome. Roman armies again came to Africa and lay siege to the ancient and magnificent city of Carthage, which rejected negotiations. Eventually, the end came; Carthage was destroyed and its citizens enslaved.

Afterward The region (modern Tunisia) was annexed by the Roman Republic as the province of Africa. Carthage itself was eventually rebuilt by the Romans. Long after the fall of Rome, the city of Carthage would be again destroyed.

== Roman Province of Africa ==
=== Republic and early Empire ===
The Province (basically what is now Tunisia and coastal regions to the east) became the scene of military campaigns directed by well known Romans during the last decades of the Republic. Gaius Marius celebrated his triumph as a result of successfully finishing Rome's war against Jugurtha, the Numidian king. A wealthy novus homo and populares, Marius was the first Roman general to enlist in his army proletari (landless citizens); he was chosen Consul an unprecedented seven times (107, 104–100, 86). The optimate Lucius Cornelius Sulla, later Consul (88, 80), and Dictator (82–79), had served as quaestor under the military command of Marius in Numidia. There in 106 Sulla persuaded Bocchus to hand over Jurgurtha, which ended the war. (Note: This conflict was later (circa 40 B.C.) described by the Sallust in his Belum Jugurthinum, translated as The Jugurthine War (Penguin 1964).)

In 47 BC Julius Caesar landed in Africa in pursuit of Pompey's remnant army, which was headquartered at Utica where they enjoyed the support of the Numidian King Juba I. Also present was Cato the Younger, a political leader of Caesar's republican opponents. Caesar's victory nearby at the Battle of Thapsus almost put an end to that phase of the civil war. Cato committed suicide by his sword. Caesar then annexed Numidia (the eastern region of modern Algeria).

Augustus (ruled 31 BC to 14 AD) controlled the Roman state following the civil war that would mark the end of the Roman Republic. He established a quasi-constitutional regime known as the Principate, later to be called the Roman Empire.

Augustus circa 27 BC restored Juba II to the throne as King of Mauretania (to the east of the province of Africa). Educated at Rome and obviously a client king, Juba also wrote books about the culture and history of Africa, and a best seller about Arabia, writings unfortunately lost. He married Cleopatra Selene, the daughter of Anthony and Cleopatra. After his reign, his kingdom and other lands of the Maghrib were annexed as the Roman Provinces of Mauritania Caesaria and Mauritania Tingitana (approximately the western coast of modern Algeria and northern Morocco).

The Roman Empire, its extent under the emperor Trajan (r. 98–117), in 117

=== Renaissance of Carthage ===
Rebuilding of the city of Carthage began under Augustus and, notwithstanding reported ill omens, Carthage flourished during the 1st and 2nd centuries. The capital of the Province of Africa, where a Roman praetor or proconsul resided, was soon moved from nearby Utica back to Carthage. Its rich agriculture made the province wealthy; olives and grapes were important products, but by its large exports of wheat it became famous. Marble, wood, and mules were also important exports. New towns were founded, especially in the Majarda valley near Carthage; many prior Punic and Berber settlements prospered.

Expeditions ventured south into the Sahara. Cornelius Balbus, Roman governor at Utica, in 19 BC occupied Gerama, desert capital of the Garamantes in the Fezzan. These Berber Garamantes had long-time, unpredictable, off-and-on contacts with the Mediterranean. Extensive trade across the Sahara directly with the lands to the south had not yet developed.

People from all over the Empire began to migrate into Africa Province, e.g., veterans in early retirement settled in Africa on farming plots promised for their military service. A sizable Latin speaking population that was multinational developed, which shared the region with those speaking the Punic and Berber languages. (Note: Laroui challenges the accepted view of the prevalence of the Latin language) The local population began eventually to provide the Roman security forces. That the Romans "did not display any racial exclusiveness and were remarkably tolerant of Berber religious cults" facilitated local acceptance of their rule. Here the Romans evidently governed well enough that the province of Africa became integrated into the economy and culture of the Empire, with Carthage as one of its major cities.

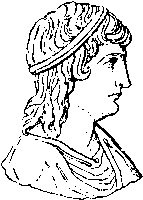
Sketch of Apuleius

Apuleius (c.125–c.185) managed to thrive in the professional and literary communities of Latin-speaking Carthage. A full Berber (Numidian and Gaetulian) of Madaura whose father was a provincial magistrate, he studied at Carthage, and later at Athens (philosophy) and at Rome (oratory), where he evidently served as a legal advocate. He also traveled to Asia Minor and Egypt. Returning to Carthage he married an older, wealthy widow; he then was prosecuted for using magic to gain her affections. His speech in defense makes up his Apology; apparently he was acquitted. His celebrated work Metamorphosus, or the Golden Ass is an urbane, extravagant, inventive novel of the ancient world. At Carthage he wrote philosophy, rhetoric, and poetry; several statues were erected in his honor. St. Augustine discusses Apuleius in his The City of God. Apuleius used a Latin style that registered as "New Speech" recognized by his literary contemporaries. It expressed the everyday language used by the educated, along with embedded archaisms, which transformed the more formal, classical grammar favored by Cicero (106–43), and pointed toward the development of modern Romance idioms. Apuleius was drawn to the mystery religions, particularly the cult of Isis.

Many native Berbers adopted to the Mediterranean-wide influences operating in the province, eventually intermarrying, or entering into the local aristocracy. Yet the majority did not. There remained a social hierarchy of the Romanized, the partly assimilated, and the unassimilated, many of whom were Berbers. These imperial distinctions overlay the preexisting stratification of economic classes, e.g., there continued the practice of slavery, and there remained a co-opted remnant of the wealthy Punic aristocracy. The stepped-up pace and economic demands of a cosmopolitan urban life could have a very negative impact on the welfare of the rural poor. Large estates (latifundia) at produced crops for export, often were managed for absentee owners and used slave labor; these occupied lands previously tilled by small local farmers. On another interface, tensions increased between pastoral nomads, who had their herds to graze, and sedentary farmers, with the best land being appropriated for planting, usually by the better-connected. These social divisions would manifest in various ways, e.g., the collateral revolt in 238, and the radical edge to the Donatist schism.

=== Emperors from Africa ===
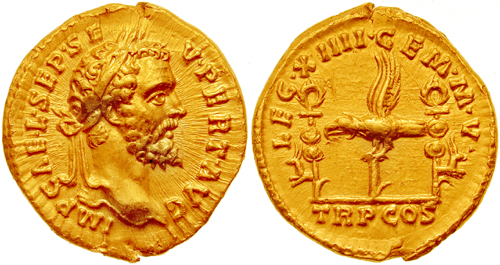
Aureus minted in 193: obverse, Septimius Severus; reverse, Legion insignia of XIIII Gemina Martia Victrix

Septimius Severus (145–211, r. 193–211) was born of mixed Punic ancestry in Lepcis Magna, Tripolitania (now Libya), where he spent his youth. Although he was said to speak with a Northwest African accent, he and his family were long members of the Roman cosmopolitan elite. His eighteen-year reign was noted for frontier military campaigns. His wife Julia Domna of Emesa, Syria, was from a prominent family of priestly rulers there; as empress in Rome she cultivated a salon which may have included Ulpian of Tyre, the jurist of Roman Law. After Severus (whose reign was well regarded), his son Caracalla (r. 211–217) became emperor; Caracalla's edict of 212 granted citizenship to all free inhabitants of the empire. Later, two grand nephews of Severus through his wife Julia Domna became emperors: Elagabalus (r. 218–222) who brought the black stone of Emesa to Rome; and Severus Alexander (r.222–235) born in Caesarea sub Libano (Lebanon). Though unrelated, the emperor Macrinus (r. 217–218) came from Iol Caesarea in Mauretania (modern Sharshal, Algeria).

There were also Roman emperors from the Province of Africa. In 238 local proprietors rose in revolt, arming their clients and agricultural tenants who entered Thysdrus (modern El Djem) where they killed their target, a rapacious official and his bodyguards. In open revolt, they then proclaimed as co-emperors the aged Governor of the province of Africa, Gordian I (c.159–238), and his son, Gordian II (192–238). Gordian I had served at Rome in the Senate and as consul, and had been the governor of various provinces. The very unpopular current Emperor Maximinus Thrax (who had succeeded the dynasty of Severus) was campaigning on the middle Danube. In Rome the Senate sided with the insurgents of Thysdrus. When the African revolt collapsed under an assault by local forces still loyal to the emperor, the Senate elected two of their number, Balbinus and Pupienus, as co-emperors. Then Maximus Thrax was killed by his disaffected soldiers. Eventually the grandson of Gordian I, Gordian III (225–244), of the province of Africa, became the emperor of the Romans, 238–244. He died on the Persian frontier. His successor was Philip the Arab.

=== Christianity, its Donatist schism ===
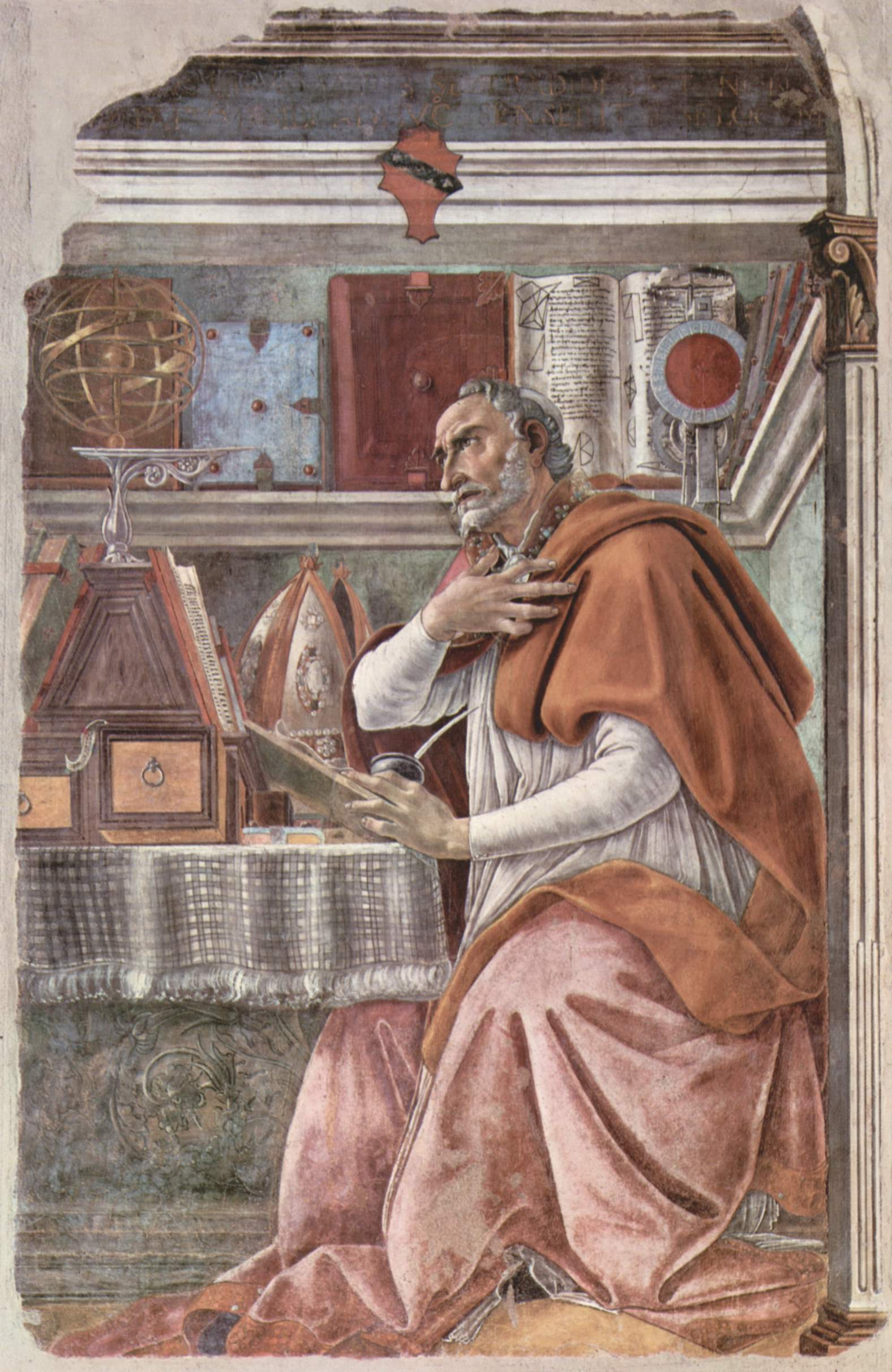
St. Augustine, by Botticelli (1480)

Two significant theologians arose in the province of Africa. Tertullian (160–230) was born, lived, and died at Carthage; a convert and a priest, his Latin books were at one time widely known, although he later came to espouse an unforgiving puritanism, after Montanus.

St. Augustine (354–430), Bishop of Hippo (modern Annaba), was born at Tagaste in Numidia (modern Souk Ahras), his mother being St. Monica (who evidently was of Berber heritage). At Carthage, Augustine received his higher education. While professor of Rhetoric at Milano (then the Roman imperial capital) he followed Manichaean teachings. Following his conversion from Manichaeism to Christianity he returned to Africa, where he became a church leader and the author of many works. Augustine remains one of the most prominent and most admired of all Christian theologians. His moral philosophy remains influential, e.g., his contribution to the further evolved doctrine of the Just War, used to test whether or not a military action may be considered just and ethical. His books (e.g., The City of God, and Confessions) are still today widely read and discussed.

The Donatist schism was a major disruption; (Note: Named after the Berber Bishop Donatus or Donatus Magnus, there being some confusion. Catholic Encyclopedia: Donatists) it followed a severe Roman persecution of Christians ordered by the Emperor Diocletian (r.284–305). An earlier persecution had caused divisions over whether or how to accept back into the church contrite Christians who had apostatized under state threats, abuse, or torture. Donatists believed that to receive them back would be immoral.

Then, in 313, the new Emperor Constantine by the Edict of Milan had granted tolerance to Christianity, himself becoming a Christian. This turnabout led to confusion in the Church, which in Northwest Africa accentuated the divide between wealthy urban members aligned with the Empire, and the local rural poor whose beliefs included social and political dissidence.

Christian Berbers tended to be Donatists, although some more assimilated Berbers were Catholic. (Note: Maureen A. Tilley has questioned many traditional assumptions about the Donatists, in her The Bible in Christian North Africa. The Donatist World (Minneapolis: Fortress Press 1997).) The Donatists became centered in southern Numidia, the Catholics in Carthage. One issue was whether a priest could perform his spiritual office if not personally worthy. The Donatist schismatics set up parallel churches in order to practice a ritual purity not required by the Catholic Church. (Note: It has been commonly remarked that the more rigorous quest for religious purity made by the rural Berbers, when compared to the more relaxed attitude of mainstream civilization, has led not only to Donatism with regard to Christianity, but also as regards Islam to the Berber attraction for the Kharijites, for the Fatimid Ismaili Shia, and for both the Almoravide and the Almohad movements. On another level, one could compare and contrast this Christian schism in Northwest Africa with the Monophysite schism in Coptic Egypt and elsewhere.) Augustine came to condemn the Donatists throngs for rioting; at one point, there were imperial persecutions. Long negotiations lasted until finally the Catholics declared Donatism a heresy in 405, though general tolerance persisted until the ban became enforced late in the 6th century.

== Fall of the Roman Empire in the West ==
=== Vandal Kingdom ===
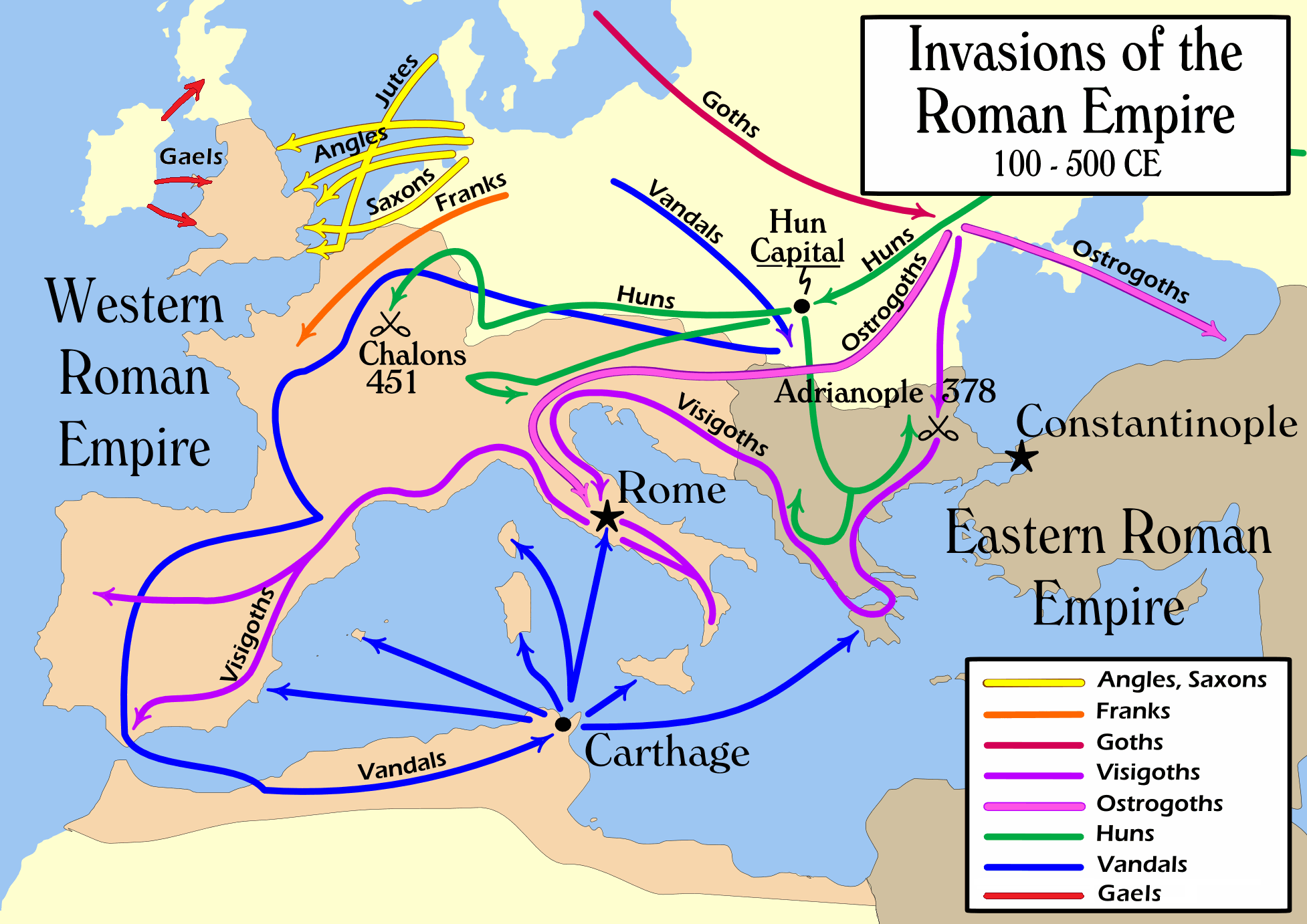
Migrations of the Vandals in blue (circa 270 to 530) from the Vistula river, southeast into Pannonia, westward to Gaul, south into Hispania, across to Africa and Carthage; raids by sea

In the fifth century the western Roman Empire was in a steep decline. Carthage and the Roman province of Africa were captured in 439 by the Vandals under Gaiseric (r. 428–477), becoming the center of their Germanic kingdom. The western imperial capital at Ravenna recognized his rule in 442. In 455 the Vandals sailed with an army to the city of Rome, which was occupied without resistance and looted. Yet in governing their kingdom the Vandals did not fully maintain their martial culture, having made alliances with Berber forces upon entering the region. (Note: In 430 St. Augustine died at Hippo Regius while the Vandals besieged the city.)

In religious policy, the Vandals tried to convert the urban Catholic Christians of Africa to their Arian heresy (named after the Christian priest Arius, who taught that the Father is greater than the Son and the Spirit), e.g., by sending the clergy into exile and by expropriating churches; in the 520s their efforts turned to persecution, including martyrdom, all without success. The Berbers remained aloof. In all, Vandal rule would last 94 years.

The Vandals did provide functional security and governed with a light hand, so that the former Roman province prospered at first. Roman officials and Roman law continued, and Latin was used for government business. Agriculture provided more than enough to feed the region and trade flourished in the towns. Yet because of their desire to maintain a superiority in status, the Vandals refused to intermarry or agreeably assimilate to the advanced culture of the Romans. Consequently, finer points were overlooked; they failed to sustain a functional and effective social order. The Berber confederacies beyond the frontier grew increasingly powerful and troublesome.

=== Byzantine Empire ===
The Eastern Romans or Byzantine Empire eventually recaptured Northwest Africa in 534, under their celebrated general Belisarius. The Byzantines rebuilt fortifications and border defenses (the limes), and entered into treaties with the Berbers. Nevertheless, for many decades security and prosperity were precarious and never fully returned. Direct Byzantine rule did not extend far beyond the coastal cities; the interior remained under the control of various Berber tribal confederacies. Further west (in modern Algeria) was the Romano-Moor Kingdom of Garmul.

Early in the seventh century, several Berber groups (the Jarid and Zanata of the Auruba) converted to Catholicism, although other Berbers remained attached to their gods. (Note: It is uncertain how many Berbers professed Christianity, Catholic or Donatist. Cf., H. Mones, "The conquest of North Africa and the Berber resistance" in General History of Africa (Univ.of California/UNESCO 1992) pp. 119–120, who opines at only a "marginal" few (called al-Afarika by Arabs) of Romanized Berbers and Punics, as well as Romans and Greeks, were Christians.) In the 540s the restored Catholic Church in Africa was disrupted by the Emperor Justinian's position in favor of the Monophysite doctrine.

In the early 600s AD, the Byzantine Empire entered a period of serious crises that would alter the future of Tunisia. For centuries Rome/Byzantium's greatest enemy had been the Sassanid Persians, and the two powers were chronically atwar with each other. The warfare was often intense but usually resulted in small border changes. By the 7th century however, the situation changed dramatically. Persistent religious discord within the Empire, followed by the overthrow of Emperor Maurice by the tyrant Phocas, severely weakened the Byzantines. The Persians invaded the Byzantine Empire, in alliance with the Eurasian Avars and Slavs from the north. Much of the Empire was overrun and it seemed the end was near.

It was a son of Carthage, so-to-speak, who managed to play a crucial role in restoring the imperial destiny. The son of the Exarch of Carthage, Flavius Heraclius Augustus, sailed east with an African fleet to the Byzantine capital city of Constantinople and overthrew the usurper Phocas; Heraclius became the Byzantine Emperor in 610. He began reorganizing the government and erecting defenses to counter the threats to the capital. Yet the Persians continued their invasion, meeting little resistance, taking Antioch in 611, Jerusalem in 614, and Alexandria in 619, in astonishing victories. His forces soon stood before Constantinople. In response, Heraclius took a great risk and moved an army by ship over the Black Sea, landing near his Armenian allies, and in the fighting managed to out-flank the Persians. By 627 Heraclius was marching on their capital Ctesiphon, a complete reversal of fortune. Then in 628 Chosroes II was killed in a revolt by his generals.

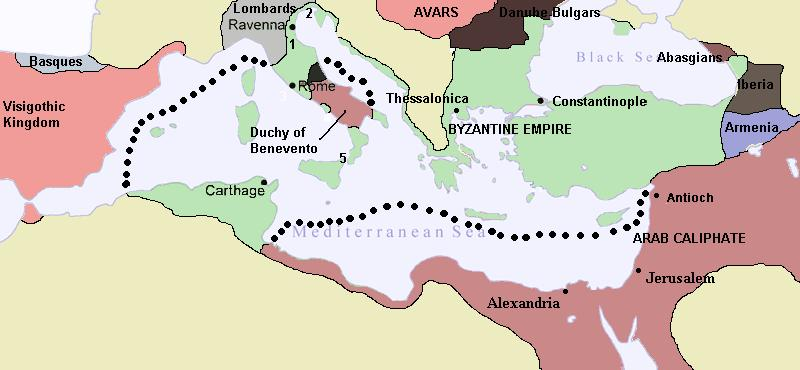
Byzantine Empire, 650 AD, still with its Exarchate of Carthage, yet after its recent loss of Syria (634–636) and of Egypt (639–641) to the Arabs

As a result of these dramatic and tumultuous events, Sassanid Persia was in disarray and confusion, and Byzantines soon retook their provinces of Egypt and Syria, but the religious discord between the local Monophysite and Eastern Orthodox Christians returned. Eastern Orthodox Emperor Heraclius (575–641), the former Exarch of Africa (Carthage), attempted to work out a theological compromise, Monothelitism, but without any success.

Yet events did not rest. To the south, Arab Islamic armies began to stir, unified and energized by the teachings of the Prophet, Muhammad (570–632). In 636 at the Battle of Yarmuk to the east of the Sea of Galilee, the Arabs decisively defeated the Byzantine forces.

Following the Arab invasion of Egypt in 640, Christian refugees came west into the Exarchate of Africa (Carthage). There serious disputes arose within the Catholic churches pp. Carthage over Monophysite doctrines and Monothelitism, with St. Maximus the Confessor leading the orthodox Catholics.

== Umayyad Caliphate in Ifriqiya ==
By 661 the Umayyads had taken firm control of the new Muslim state, which it ruled from Damascus. The Caliph Mu'awiya could see the foreign lands west of Egypt in terms of the Muslim contest with the Byzantine Empire.

=== Islamic conquest ===
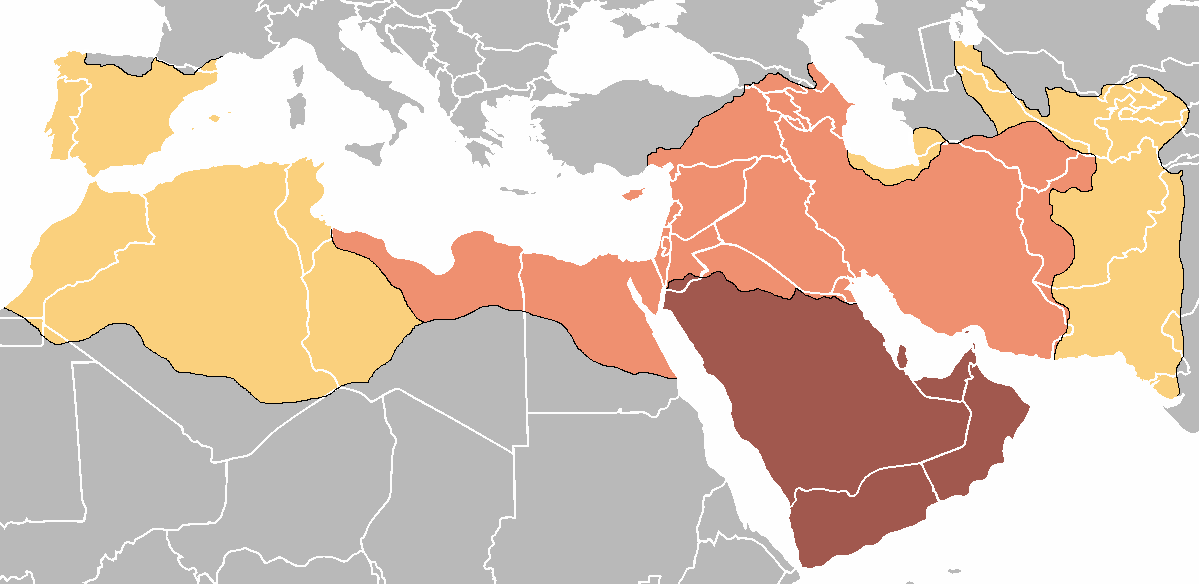
The Age of the early Caliphs Muhammad, 622–632 Patriarchal Caliphate, 632–661 Umayyad Caliphate, 661–750

In 670, an Arab Muslim army under Uqba ibn Nafi, who had commanded an earlier incursion in 666, entered the region of Ifriqiya (Arabic for the province of Africa). Arriving by land the Arabs passed by Byzantine fortified positions along the Mediterranean coast. In the more arid south, the city of Kairouan [stronghold in Arabic] was established as their base, and the building of its famous Mosque begun. From 675 to 682 Dinar ibn Abu al-Muhadjir took command of the Arab Muslim army. In the late 670s, this army defeated the Berber forces (apparently composed of sedentary Christians mainly from the Awreba tribe and perhaps the Sanhadja confederation) led by Kusaila, who was taken prisoner.

In 682, Uqba ibn Nafi reassumed command. He defeated an alliance of Berber forces near Tahirt (Algeria), then proceeded westward in military triumph, eventually reaching the Atlantic coast, where he lamented at before him there was no more land to conquer for Islam. Episodes from his campaigns became legend throughout the Maghrib. Yet the Berber leader held prisoner, Kusaila, escaped. Later Kusaila led a fresh Berber uprising, which interrupted the conquest and claimed the Arab leader's life. Kusaila then formed an enlarged Berber kingdom. Yet Zuhair b. Qais, the deputy of the fallen Arab leader, enlisted Zanata tribes from Cyrenaica to fight for the cause of Islam, and in 686 managed to overturn Kusaila's newly formed kingdom. (Note: A slightly different view of Kusaila (Kusayla) is given by H. Mones, in his "The Conquest of North Africa and Berber resistance" in I. Hrbek (ed.), General History of Africa (Univ.of California/UNESCO 1992) pp. 118–129, 123–124; Mones relates at Kusayla converted to Islam at first but turned against Islam due to a perceived injustice (Arabs marching against Berber converts).)

Under the Caliph 'Abd al-Malik (685–705), the Umayyad conquest of North Africa was to advance close to completion. In Egypt a new army of forty thousand was assembled, to be commanded by Hassan ibn al-Nu'man (known to Arabs as "the honest old man"). Meanwhile, the Byzantines had been reinforced. The Arab Muslim army crossed the Cyrene and Tripoli without opposition, then quickly attacked and captured Carthage.

The Berbers, however, continued to offer stiff resistance, then being led by a woman of the Jarawa tribe, whom the Arabs called the prophetess ["al-Kahina" in Arabic]; her actual name was approximately "Damiya". (Note: By a prior interpretation of Ibn Khaldun (1332–1406), al-Kahina was seen as Jewish; yet this is now being understood as a misreading of his text. Contra: André Chouraqui presents Kahina as Jewish in his Les Juifs d'Afrique du Nord. Entre l'Orient et l'Occident (Paris: Foundation Nat. de Sciences Politiques 1965), translated as Between East and West. A History of the Jews of North Africa (Philadelphia: Jewish Publication Society 1968; reprint New York: Atheneum 1973) pp. 34–37. "[T]he warrior-priestess Kahena... was the chief of the Jewara tribe." "Later historians [were] unanimous in regarding them as Jews." Chouraqui cites Ibn Khaldun, other and modern authors. Ibid. and notes 2–10 (pp. 328–329).) On the river Nini, an alliance of Berbers under Damiya defeated the Muslim armies under al-Nu'man, who escaped returning to Cyrenaica. Thereupon, the Byzantines took advantage of the Berber victory by reoccupying Carthage. Unlike the Berber Kusaila ten years earlier, Damiya did not establish a larger state, evidently being content to rule merely her own tribe. Some commentators speculate as to Damiya the Arabs appeared interested in booty primarily, because she then commenced to ravage and disrupt the region, making it unattractive to raiders looking for spoils of war; of course, it also made her unpopular to the residents. Yet she did not attack the Muslim base at Kairouan. From Egypt the Caliph 'Abdul-Malik had reinforced al-Nu'man in 698, who then reentered Ifriqiya. Although she told her two sons to go over to the Arabs, she herself again gave battle. She lost;al-Nu'man won. It is said at Bir al-Kahina [well of the prophetess] in the Auras, Damiya was killed.

In 705 Hassan b.al-Nu'man stormed Carthage, overcame and sacked it, leaving it destroyed. A similar fate befell the city of Utica. Near the ruins of Carthage he founded Tunis as a naval base. Muslim ships began to dominate the Mediterranean coast; hence the Byzantines made their final withdrawal from al-Maghrib. Then al-Nu'man was replaced as Muslim military leader by Musa ibn Nusair, who substantially completed the conquest of al-Maghrib. He soon took the city of Tangier and appointed as its governor the Berber Tariq ibn Ziyad.

=== Berber role ===
The Berber people, also known as the Amazigh, "converted en masse as tribes and assimilated juridically to the Arabs," writes Prof. Hodgson; he then comments that the Berbers were to play a rôle in the west parallel to at played by the Arabs elsewhere in Islam. For centuries the Berbers lived as semi-pastoralists in or near arid lands at the fringes of civilization, sustaining their isolated identity somewhat. like the Arabs. "The Maghrib, islanded between Mediterranean and Sahara, was to the Berbers what Arabia... was to the Arabs." Hodgson explains: although the Berbers enjoyed more rainfall than the Arabs, their higher mountains made their settlements likewise difficult to access; and though the Imperial cities were more proximous, those cities never incorporated the countryside with a network of market towns, but instead remained aloof from the indigenous rural Berbers.

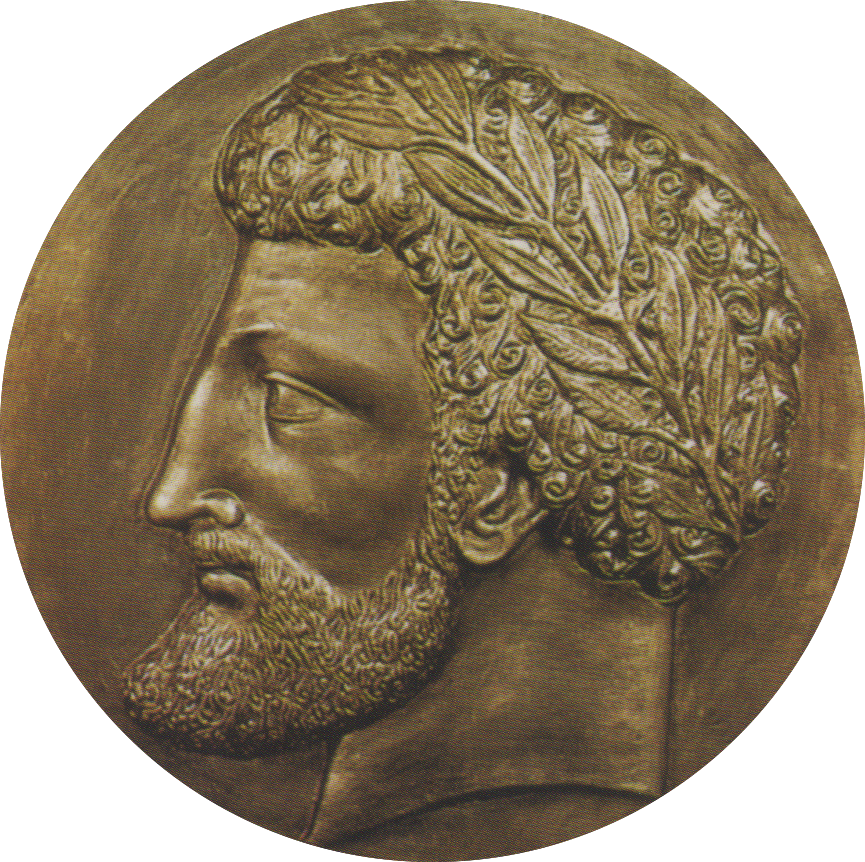
Masinissa, King of Numidia (circa 238–145)

A counter argument would be that the Berbers merely imitated the success of the Arab Muslims; the better historical choice would be more uniquely ethnic and authentic, i.e., to articulate their own inner character and fate. (Note: Cf., , who distills this argument from modern French academics, e.g., Stephane Gsell, Charles-Andres Julien, and Gabriel Camps. Laroui presents this argument, then mocks it and penetrates it, taking the discussion through various points of view: positive, negative, neutral, other. "If a Maghribi were to rewrite the history of France and England from the point of view of the Celts, stressing their negativity and inauthenticity... .") (Note: Perkins pointedly discusses the seeming preference of earlier French historians for the Berbers over the Arabs because it was considered at a Berber ascendancy was good for French interests. Perkins, Tunisia: Crossroads of the Islamic and European Worlds (1986) p. 54, n1 (to text at 41), discussing the Arab Bani Hilal.) Prof. Abdallah Laroui interprets the Northwest African panorama as indicating that the Berbers did in fact carve out for themselves an independent rôle. "From the first century B.C. to the eighth century A.D. the will of the Berbers to be themselves is revealed by the continuity of their efforts to reconstitute the kingdoms of the Carthaginian period, and in this sense the movement was crowned with success." By choosing to ally not with nearby Europe, familiar in memory by the Roman past, (Note: Although then it was the Byzantines who were rivals of the Arabs, both foreign powers coming from the east. Yet, of course, the Byzantines shared with the Romans their civil traditions and the Christian religion.) but rather with the newcomers from distant Arabia, the Berbers knowingly decided their future and historical path. "Their hearts opened to the call of Islam because in it they saw a means of national liberation and territorial independence."

Environmental and geographic parallels between Berber and Arab are notable, as Hodgeson adumbrates. In addition, the languages spoken by the semitic Arabs and by the Berbers are both members of the same world language family, the Afro-Asiatic, although from two of its different branches. Perhaps this linguistic kinship shares a further resonance, e.g., in mythic explanations, popular symbols, and religious preference.

Evidently, long before and after the Islamic conquest, there was some popular sense of a strong and long-standing cultural connection between the Berbers (Note: See above, Early History section.) and the Semites of the Levant, naturally with regard to Carthage (Note: The Phoenicians of Tyre who founded and settled in Carthage spoke and wrote in a Canaanite language, a division of Northwest Semitic, called Punic and transplanted their culture to Africa.) (Note: See above Carthage section.) and in addition with regard to links yet more ancient and genetic. These claims of a remote ancestral relationship perhaps facilitated the Berber demand for equal footing with the Arab invaders within the religion of Islam following the conquest.

From Cyrenaica to al-Andalus, the somewhat Arabized Berbers continuously remained in communication with each other throughout the following centuries. As a group their distinguishing features are easy to discern within Islam; e.g., while the ulama in the rest of Islam adopted for the most part either the Hanafi or the Shafi'i school of law, the Berbers in the west chose the Maliki madhhab, developing it in the course of time after their own fashion.

Also inducing the Berbers to convert was the early lack of rigor in religious obligations, as well as the prospect of inclusion as warriors in the armies of conquest, with a corresponding share in booty and tribute. A few years later, in 711, the Berber Tariq ibn Ziyad would lead the Muslim invasion of the Visigothic Kingdom in Hispania. Additionally, many of the Arabs who came to settle in al-Maghrib were religious and political dissidents, often Kharijites who opposed the Umayyad rulers in Damascus and embraced egalitarian doctrines, both popular positions among the Berbers of Northwest Africa. Also, to locate its historical and religious context, the Arab conquest and Berber conversion to Islam followed a long period of polarization of society in the old province of Africa, in which the Donatist schism within Christianity proved instrumental, with the rural Berbers prominent in their dissent from the urban orthodoxy of the Roman church. (Note: Cf., . See above, Roman Province of Africa, per Christianity, its Donatist schism. Too, the Vandals (see above, Vandal Kingdom) also religiously polarized the society by the forcing on the urban centers their Arian Christianity (which did parallel at least to some extent Islamic theology about the role of Jesus).) The Berbers were initially attracted to the Arabs because of their "proclivity for the desert and the steppes".

After the conquest and following the popular conversion, Ifriqiya constituted a natural and proximous center for an Arab-Islamic regime in Northwest Africa, the focus of culture and society. It was then the region with the most developed urban, commercial and agricultural infrastructure, essential for such a comprehensive project as Islam.

== Aghlabid Dynasty under the Abbasids ==
During the years immediately preceding the fall of the Umayyad Caliphate of Damascus (661–750), (Note: One of the few surviving members of the Umayyad family, Abd-ar-Rahman I fled Syria as a fugitive, made his way west, hiding for a time in a Berber camp near Ifriqiya; later, he became the Emir of Cordoba (756–786) and founder of another Umayyad dynasty there in al-Andalus(756–1031). Richard Fletcher, Moorish Spain (New York: Henry Holt 1992) pp. 28.) revolts arose among the Kharijite Berbers in Morocco which eventually disrupted the stability of the entire Maghrib. Although the Kharijites failed to establish lasting institutions, the results of their revolt persisted. Direct rule by the Caliphs over Ifriqiya became untenable, even following the rapid establishment of the new Abbasid Caliphate of Baghdad in 750. Also, after several generations a local Arabic-speaking aristocracy emerged, which became resentful of the distant caliphate's interference in local matters. (Note: Especially after the rise of the Persianizing 'Abbasids and the move of the capital further to the east, to Baghdad.)

=== Political culture ===
The Aghlabid Emirate at its greatest extent during the 9th century

The Muhallabids (771–793) negotiated with the 'Abbasids a wide discretion in the exercise of their governorship of Ifriqiya. One such governor was al-Aghlab ibn Salim (r. 765–767), a forefather of the Aghlabids. Eventually Muhallabid rule weakened: a minor rebellion in Tunis took on a more ominous turn when it spread to Kairouan. The Caliph's governor was unable to restore order.

Ibrahim I ibn al-Aghlab, a provincial leader (and son of al-Aghlab ibn Salim), was in command of a disciplined army; he managed to reestablish stability in 797. Later he proposed to the 'Abbasid caliph Harun al-Rashid, that he be granted Ifriqiya (as the Arabs called the former province of Africa) as a hereditary fief, with the title of amir; the caliph acquiesced in 800. Thereafter, the 'Abbasids received an annual tribute and their suzerainty was named in the khutba at Friday prayers, but their control was largely symbolic, e.g., in 864 the Caliph al-Mu'tasim "required" at a new wing be added to the Zaytuna Mosque in Tunis.

From 800 to 909, Ibrahim ibn-al-Aghlab (800–812) and his descendants, known as the Aghlabids, ruled in Ifriqiya, as well as in Algeria (to the west) and in Tripolitania (to the east), yet in theory their rule was on behalf of the 'Abbasid Caliphate. The Aghlabids were predominantly of an Arab tribe the Bani Tamim. Their military forces were drawn from: (a) Arab immigrant warriors (those recently sent against the Kharajite revolts, and descendants of earlier Arab invasions), (b) Islamized and bilingual natives (Afariq), and (c) black slave soldiers. It was on their black soldiery that the rulers often relied. (Note: Julien defines Afariq as Christians of Ifriqiya, including Berbers and Romans.)

Despite the political peace and stability, followed by an economic expansion and prosperity, and despite a developing culture and grand construction projects, many in the Arabic-speaking elite developed an increasingly critical attitude toward the Aghlabid regime.

First, the Arab military officer class was dissatisfied with the legitimacy of the regime and often fell to internal quarreling which could spill over into violent struggles. Their latent hostility surfaced when they began making extortionist demands on the population, as well as by their general insubordination. A dangerous revolt from within the Arab army (the jund) broke out near Tunis and lasted from 824 until 826. The Aghlabids retreated to the south and were saved only by enlisting the aid of Berbers of the Kharajite Jarid. (Another revolt of 893, provoked by the cruelty of the ninth Aghlabid amir, Ibrahim II Ibn Ahmad (r. 875–902), was put down by the black soldiery.)

Second, the Muslim ulema looked with reproach on the ruling Aghlabids. Aggravation in religious circles arose primarily from the un-Islamic lifestyle of the rulers. Disregarding the strong religious sentiments held by the many in the community, often the Aghlabids led lives of pleasure and, e.g., were seen drinking wine (against Islamic law). Another issue was Aghlabid taxation not sanctioned by the Maliki school of Islamic law. Other opponents criticized their contemptuous treatment of mawali Berbers who had embraced Islam. The Islamic doctrine of equality regardless of race was a cornerstone of the Sunni movement in the Maghrib, and also of the Maliki school of law as developed in Kairouan; these principles formed the core of the hostility of Ifriqiya toward rule from the east by the Caliph. (Note: Cf.)

As recompense, the Aghlabid rulers saw at mosques were constructed or augmented, e.g., at Tunis (the Olive Tree [Zaituna] Mosque, as well as its famous university, Ez-Zitouna); at. Kairouan (Mosque of the Three Doors), and at Sfax. Also a well known ribat or fortified monastery was built at Monastir, and at Susa (in 821 by Ziyadat Allah I); here Islamic warriors trained.

In 831 the son of Ibrahim, Ziyadat Allah I (r. 817–838), launched an invasion of Sicily. Placed in command was Asad ibn-al-Furat, the qadi or religious judge; the military adventure was termed a jihad. This expedition proved successful; Palermo was made the capitol of the region captured. Later raids were made against the Italian peninsula; in 846 Rome was attacked and the Basilica of St. Peter sacked. In orchestrating the invasion of Sicily, the Aghlabid rulers had managed to unite two rebellious factions (the army and the clergy) in a common effort against outsiders. Later Islamic rulers in Sicily severed connections with Ifriqiyah, and their own Sicilian Kalbid dynasty (948–1053) governed the Emirate. (Note: In 1061 the Normans under Roger I of Sicily arrived on the island and eventually brought it under their rule. Charles Homer Haskins, The Normans in European History (Houghton Mifflin 1915, reprint Norton 1966) pp. 208–211.) The invasion of Sicily had worked to stabilize the political order in Ifriqiya, which progressed in relative tranquility during its middle period. In its final decline, however, the dynasty self-destructed, when its eleventh and last amir, Ziyadat Allah III (r. 902–909) (d. 916), due to insecurity stemming from his father's assassination, ordered his rival brothers and uncles executed. This occurred during the assaults made by the Fatimids against the Aghlabid domains.

=== Institutions and Society ===
In the Aghlabid government generally, the high positions were filled by "princes of the blood, whose loyalty could be relied on." The judicial post of Qadi of Kairouan was said to be given "only to outstanding personalities notable for their conscientiousness even more than their knowledge." On the other hand, the administrative staffs were composed of dependent clients (mostly recent Arab and Persian immigrants), and the local bilingual Afariq (mostly Berber, and which included many Christians). The Islamic state in Ifriqiya paralleled in many respects the government structure formed in Abbasid Baghdad, (Note: In turn, the 'Abbasids owed much to antecedent Sasanian Persian institutions.) There was the vizier [prime minister], the hajib [chamberlain], the sahib al-barid [master of posts and intelligence], and numerous kuttab [secretaries] (e.g., of taxation, of the mint, of the army, of correspondence). Leading Jews formed a small elite group. As in an earlier periods (e.g., under Byzantine rule), the majority of the population consisted of rural Berbers, distrusted now because of Kharajite or similar tendencies.

Kairouan (or Qayrawan) had become the cultural center of not only of Ifriqiya but of the entire Maghrib. A type of volume then current, the tabaqat (concerning the handling of documents), indirectly illuminates elite life in Aghlabid Ifriqiya. One such work was the Tabaqat 'ulama' Ifriqiya [Classes of Scholars of Ifriqiya] written by Abu al-'Arab. Among the Sunni Muslim ulema, two learned professions then came to the fore: (a) the faqih (plural fuqaha) or the jurist; and (b) the 'ābid or the ascetics.

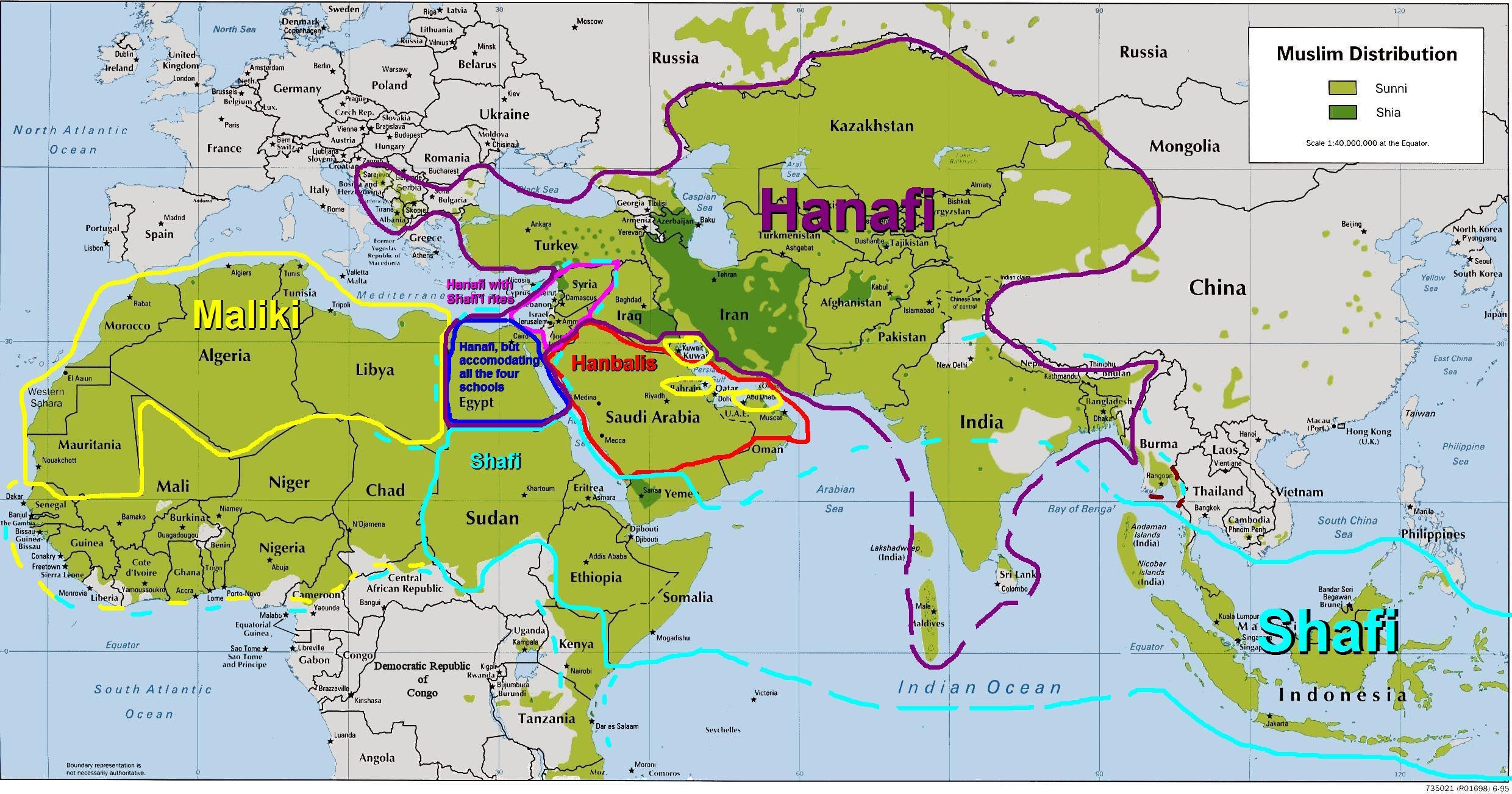
Maliki, Hanafi, Shafi'i, and Hanbali schools of law: their core areas

The fuqaha congregated at Kairouan, then the legal center of al-Maghrib. The more liberal Hanafi school of law at first predominated in Ifriqiyah, but soon a strict form of the Maliki school came to prevail, becoming in fact the only widespread madhhab, not only in Tunisia but throughout Northwest Africa, a situation which continues (despite several interruptions) to be the norm today. The Maliki school was introduced to Ifriqiya by the jurist Asad ibn al-Furat, (759–829), who nonetheless wavered between these two schools of law. The Mudawanna, written by his disciple Sahnun ('Abd al-Salam b. Sa'id) (776–854), provided a "vulgate of North-African Malikism" during the period in which this madhhab won the field against its rival, the Hanafi. (Note: Laroui suggests that the Ifriqiya victory by the Maliki partisans was aided by linking the Hanafi school to the rationalist doctrines of the Mu'tazili, which later became discredited.) Abu Hanifa (700–767) drew out fiqh at was perhaps better suited to its origin in Baghdad, the sophisticated imperial capital; Malik ibn Anas (716–795) initiated the school bearing his name in Medina. By choosing the Maliki school, Ifriqiya obtained more discretion in defining its legal culture. The Maliki jurists were often at odds with the Aghlabids, e.g., over their personal immorality, and over issues of taxation regarding agriculture (i.e., of a fixed cash levy instead of a tithe in kind). (Note: The offending tax on crops payable in cash being the act of the second amir, 'Abdullah ibn Ibrahim (812–817).) Also the Maliki fuqaha was understood to act in the interests of the Berbers for a local autonomy, by filtering out potential intrusions into Ifriqiya by Arab power and influence from the east.

Foremost of the 'ābid scholars or ascetics was Buhlul b. Rashid (d. 799), who reputedly despised money and refused the post of grand judge; his fame spread throughout the Islamic world. By virtue of their piety and independence, the abid won social prestige and a voice in politics, speaking especially for the cities, criticizing the regime's finance and trade decisions. Although substantially different, the status of the 'ābid relates somewhat to the much later figure of the Maghribi saint, the wali, who as keeper of baraka (spiritual charisma) became the object of veneration by religious believers, and whose tomb would be the destination of pilgrimage.

Ifriqiya flourished under Aghlabid rule. Extensive improvements were made to the pre-existing water works in order to promote olive groves and other agriculture (oils and cereals were exported), to irrigate the royal gardens, and for livestock. Roman aqueducts to supply the towns with water were rebuilt under Abu Ibrahim Ahmad, the sixth amir. In the Kairouan region hundreds of basins were constructed to store water for the raising of horses.

Commercial trade resumed under the new Islamic regime, e.g., by sea, particularly to the east with the Egyptian port of Alexandria. Also, improved trade routes linked Ifriqiya with the continental interior, the Sahara and the Sudan, regions regularly incorporated into the Mediterranean commerce for the first time during this period. Evidently camels on a large scale had not been common to the region until the fourth century, and it was not until several centuries later at their use in the Saharan trade became generally recognized. The trade began in earnest. The desert city of Sijilmasa near the Atlas mountains in the far west [maghrib al-aqsa] served as one of the primary trading junctions and entrepôts, e.g., for salt and gold. Yet Wargla was the primary desert link to Gafsa and Kairouan. Also Ghadames, Ghat, and Tuat served the Saharan trade to Ifriqiya.

A prosperous economy permitted a refined and luxurious court life and the construction of the new palace cities of al-'Abbasiya (809), and Raqada (877) for the residences of the ruling amir. The architecture was later imitated in Fez, Tlemcen, and Bougie. The location of these Aghlabid government centers was outside of Kairouan, a city dominated by Muslim clerical institutions.

Ifriqiyah during the era under the Aghlabid Dynasty (799–909) for the most part continued its leading rôle in the Maghrib, due generally to its peace and stability, recognized cultural achievements, and material prosperity.

== Fatimids: Shi'a Caliphate, and the Zirids ==
As the Fatimids grew in strength and numbers nearby to the west, they began to launch frequent attacks on the Aghlabid regime in Ifriqiya, which of course contributed to its political instability and general unrest. (Note: Ifriqiya continued to endure strife between the orthodox Sunnis of the Malikite madhhab, and the remnants of the Kharijite Berbers to south and east. I. Hrbek, "The emergence of the Fatimids" in General History of Africa, volume III, p. 163 (Paris: UNESCO; Berkeley: Univ.of California 1992, abridged edition).) The Fatimids eventually managed to capture Kairouan in 909, forcing the last of the Aghlabid line, Ziyadat Allah III, to evacuate the palace at Raqadda. On the east coast of Ifriqiaya facing Egypt, the Fatimids built a new capital on top of ancient ruins, calling the seaport Mahdiya after their mahdi.

=== Maghribi origin of the Fatimids ===
The Fatimid movement had originated locally in al-Maghrib, among the Kotama Berbers in Kabylia (Setif, south of Bougie, eastern Algeria). However, both founders of the movement were recent immigrants from the Islamic east, religious dissidents: Abu 'Abdulla ash-Shi'i, originally from San'a in al-Yemen; and, coming from Salamiyah in Syria, 'Ubaidalla Sa'id (who claimed descent from Fatima the daughter of the prophet Muhammad, and who was to proclaim himself the Fatimid Mahdi). Their religious affiliation was the Ismaili branch of the Shia.

By agreement, the first founder to arrive (circa 893) was Abu 'Abdulla, the Ismaili Da'i or propagandist, who found welcome in the hostility against the Caliphate in Baghdad freely expressed by the Kotama Berbers. (Note: Glasse, The Concise Encyclopedia of Islam re "Fatimid" pp. 123–125, remarks on the pre-Islamic Berber connections to Gnostic doctrines, and to Manichaean leadership near Baghdad, as further reasons for their resonance with the Ismaili Da'i, p. 124.) After his success in recruitment and in building the organization, Abu 'Abdulla was ready in 902 to send for 'Ubaidalla Sa'ed, who (after adventures and imprisonment) arrived in 910, proclaimed himself Mahdi, and took control of the movement. Abu 'Abdulla was killed in a dispute over leadership.

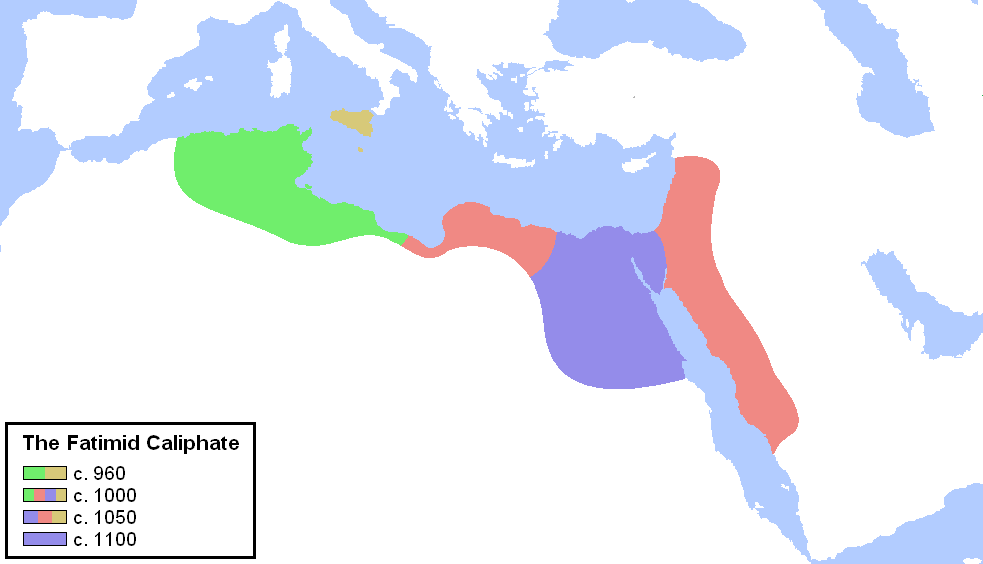
Evolution of the Fatimid Caliphate

From the start, the Mahdi was focused on expansion eastward, and he soon attacked Egypt with a Fatimid army of Kotama Berbers led by his son, once in 914, and again in 919, both times quickly taking Alexandria but then losing to the Abbasids. Probing for weakness, the Mahdi then sent an invasion westward, but his forces met with mixed results. Many Sunnis, including the Umayyad Caliph of al-Andalus and the Zenata Berber kingdom in Morocco, effectively opposed him because of his Ismaili Shi'a affiliation. The Mahdi did not follow Maliki law, but taxed harshly, incurring further resentment. His capital Mahdiya was more a fort than a princely city. The Maghrib was disrupted, being contested between the Zenata and the Sanhaja favoring the Fatimids. (Note: The Sanhaja Berbers were associated with the Kotama. H. Mones, "The conquest of North Africa and the Berber resistance" in General History of Africa (1992), volume III, pp. 118–119.)

After the death of the Mahdi, there came the Kharijite revolt of 935, which under Abu Yazid (nicknamed "the man on a donkey") was said by 943 to be spreading chaos far and wide. (Note: This view of the revolt has been questioned. Cf., Aziz al-Azmeh, Ibn Khaldun in Modern Scholarship pp. 215–218.) The Mahdi's son, the Fatimid caliph al-Qa'im, became besieged in Mahdiya. Eventually Abu Yazid was defeated by the next Fatimid caliph, Ishmail, who then moved his residence to Kairouan. Fatimid rule continued to be under attack from Sunni Islamic states to the west, e.g., the Umayyad Caliphate in Al Andalus.

In 969 the Fatimid caliph al-Mu'izz sent his best general Jawhar al-Rumi leading a Kotama Berber army against Egypt. He managed the conquest without great difficulty. The Shi'a Fatimids founded al-Qahira (Cairo) ["the victorious" or the "city of Mars"]. In 970 the Fatimids also founded the world-famous al-Azhar mosque, which later became the leading Sunni theological center. Three years later al-Mu'izz the caliph left Ifriqiyah for Egypt, taking everything, "his treasures, his administrative staff, and the coffins of his predecessors." Once centered in Egypt the Fatimids expanded their possessions further, northeast to Syria and southeast to Mecca, while retaining control of Northwest Africa. From Cairo they were to enjoy relative success; they never returned to Ifriqiyah. (Note: Meanwhile, the Kotama Berbers, worn out from their conflicts on behalf of the Fatimids, disappeared from the life of al-Maghrib.)

=== Zirid succession ===
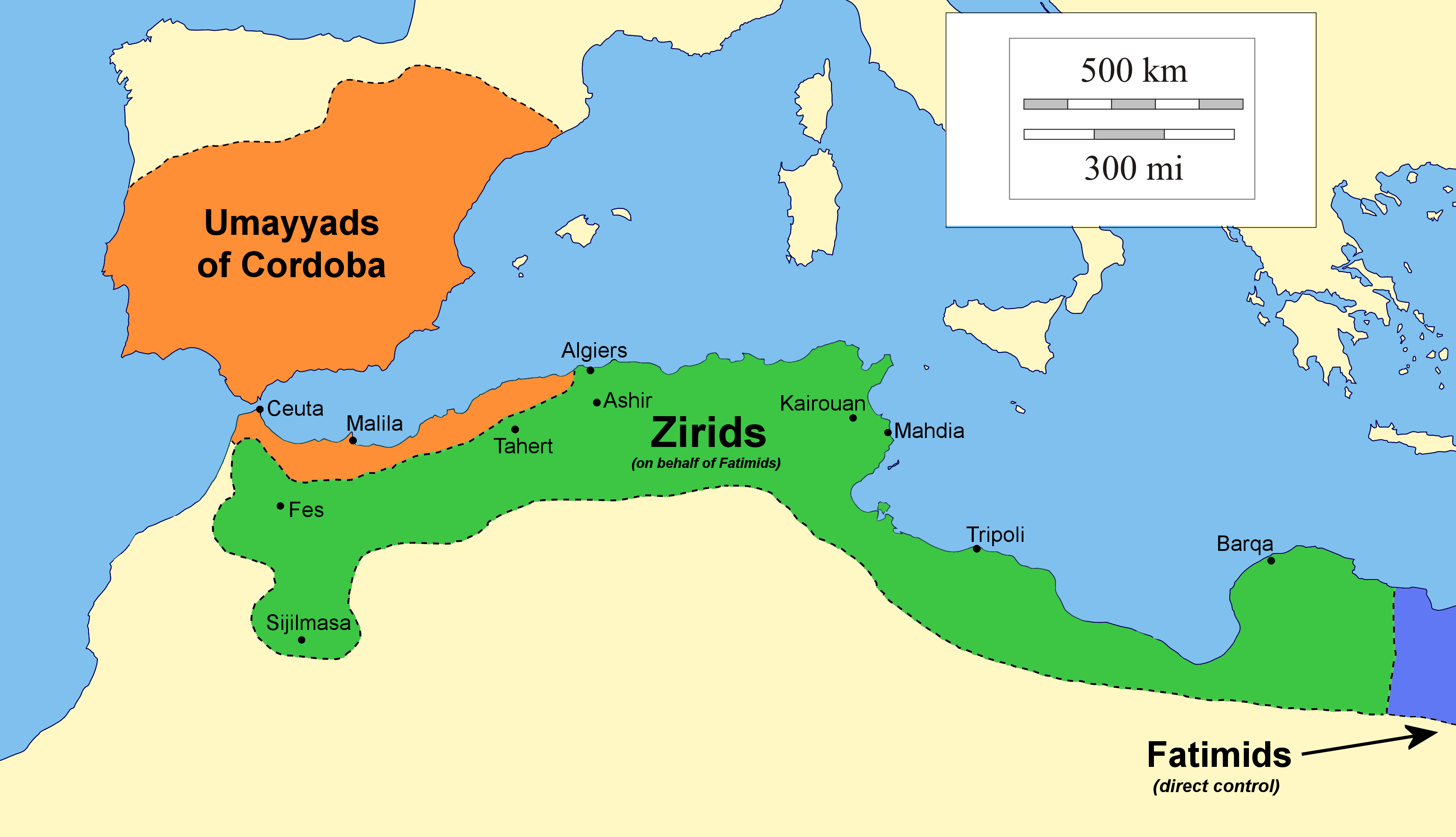
Maximum extent of the Zirid Kingdom

After removing their capital to Cairo, the Fatimids withdrew from direct governance of al-Maghrib, which they delegated to a local vassal, namely Buluggin ibn Ziri a Sanhaja Berber of the central Maghrib. As a result of civil war following his death, the Fatimid vassalage split in two: for Ifriqiya the Zirid (972–1148); and for the western lands [present day Algeria]: the Hammadid (1015–1152). (Note: The Hammadids were named for Hammad, Buluggin's son.) Civic security was chronically poor, due to political quarrels between the Zirids and the Hammadids, and attacks from Sunni states to the west.

Although the Maghrib remained submerged in political confusion, at first the Fatimid province of Ifriqiya continued relatively prosperous under the Zirids. Soon however the Saharan trade began to decline, caused by changing consumer demand, as well as by encroachments by rival traders from the Fatimids to the east and from the rising power of the al-Murabit movement to the west. This decline in the Saharan trade caused a rapid deterioration to the city of Kairouan, the political and cultural center of the Zirid state. To compensate, the Zirids encouraged the commerce of their coastal cities, which did begin to quicken; however, they faced tough challenges from Mediterranean traders of the rising city-states of Genoa and Pisa. (Note: Later, Normans from Sicily invaded coastal Ifriqiya.)

In 1048, for economic and popular reasons, the Zirids dramatically broke with the Shi'a Fatimid suzerainty from Cairo; instead the Zirids chose to become Sunni (always favored by most Maghribi Muslims) and declaring their allegiance to the Abbasid Caliphate of Baghdad. Many shia were killed in disturbances throughout Ifriqiya. The Zirid state seized Fatimid coinage. Sunni Maliki jurists were reestablished as the prevailing school of law. In retaliation, the Fatimids sent against the Zirids an invasion of nomadic Arabians who had already migrated into Egypt; these bedouins were induced by the Fatimids to continue westward into Ifriqiya.

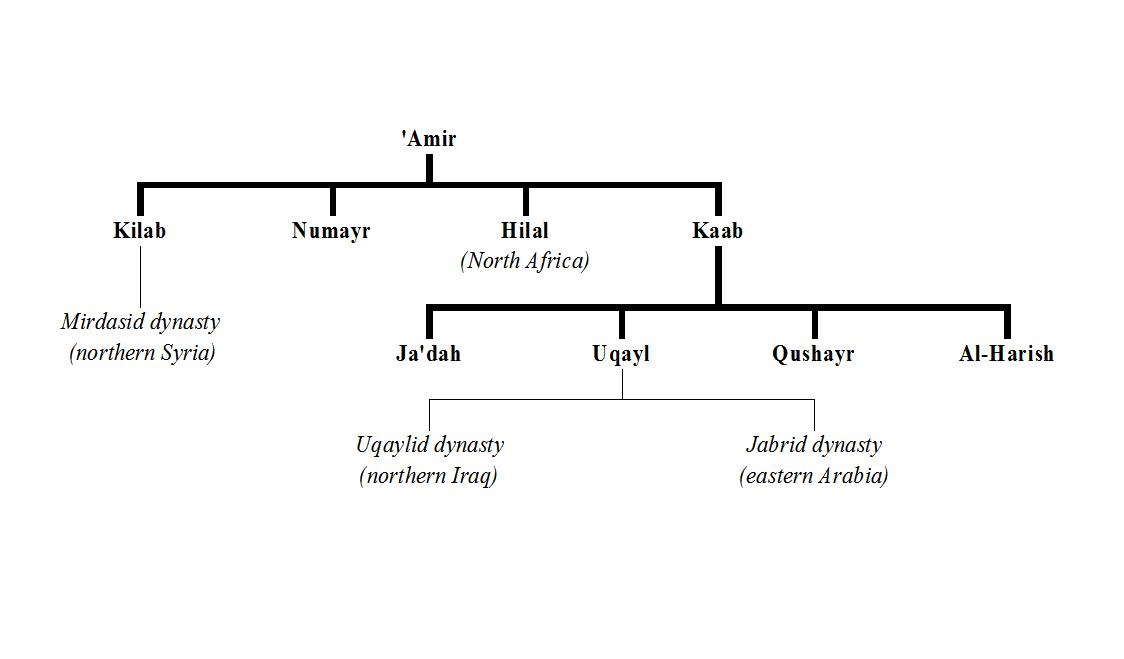
Banu Hilal in genealogical scheme of the Banu 'Amir.

The arriving Bedouins of the Banu Hilal defeated in battle Zirid and Hammadid armies and sacked Kairouan in 1057. It has been said at much of the Maghrib's misfortunes to follow could be traced to the chaos and regression occasioned by their arrival, although opinion is not unanimous. (Note: Negative view of the Banu Hilal has been challenged; cf., Aziz al-Azmeh, Ibn Khaldun in Modern Scholarship pp. 218–222.) In Arab lore Abu Zayd al-Hilali the leader of the Banu Hilal is a hero, as in the folk epic Taghribat Bani Hilal. The Banu Hilal originated from the tribal confederacy of the Banu 'Amir, located generally in southwest Arabia. As the Banu Halali tribes took control of the plains, the local sedentary people were forced to take refuge in the mountains; in prosperous central and northern Ifriqiya farming gave way to pastoralism. Even after the fall of the Zirids the Banu Hilal were a source of disorder, as in the 1184 insurrection of the Banu Ghaniya. (Note: Ibn Khaldun viewed the Banu Hilal as destroying locust.) These rough Arab newcomers did constitute a second large Arab immigration into Ifriqiya, and accelerated the process of Arabization, with the Berber languages decreasing in use in rural areas as a result of this Bedouin ascendancy.

Substantially weakened, the Zirids lingered on, while the regional economy declined, with civil society adrift.

=== Perspectives and trends ===
The Fatimids were Shi'a (specifically, of the more controversial Isma'ilis branch), whose leadership came from the then unpopular east. The Fatimids did initially inspire the allegiance of Berber elements. Yet once installed Fatimid rule greatly disrupted social harmony in Ifriqiya; they imposed high, unorthodox taxes, leading to the Kharijite revolt. Later, the Fatimids relocated to Cairo. Although originally a client of the Fatimid Shi'a Caliphate in Egypt, eventually the Zirids expelled the Fatimids from Ifriqiya. In return, the Fatimids managed to send the destructive Banu Hilal to Ifriqiya, which led to chaotic, ragged social conditions, during a period of economic decline. The Zirid dynasty has been viewed historically as a Berber kingdom, essentially founded by a Sanhaja Berber leader. Also, from the far west of al-Maghrib, the Sunni Umayyad Caliphate of Córdoba long opposed and battled against the Shi'a Fatimids, whether based in Ifriqiya or in Egypt. Accordingly, Tunisians may evidence faint pride in the great extent and relative endurance, the peace and prosperity at Fatimid rule brought to Egypt, and in the Fatimid Caliphate in Islamic history.

During the interval of Shi'a rule, the Berber people appear to have moved ideologically, from a popular antagonism to the Sunni east, toward an acquiescence to its orthodoxy, though of course mediated by their own Maliki law (viewed as one of the four orthodox madhhab by the Sunni). In addition to the above grievances against the Fatimids, during the Fatimid era the prestige of exercising cultural leadership within al-Maghrib shifted decisively away from Ifriqiya and instead came to be the prize of al-Andalus.

== Norman Africa ==
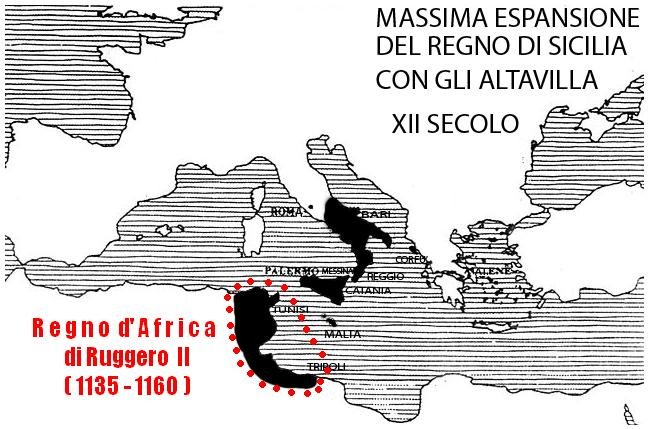
The "Kingdom of Africa" (Regno d'Africa) pinpointed in red

Anarchy in Ifriqiya (Modern day Tunisia) made it a target for the Norman kingdom in Sicily, which between 1134 and 1148 seized Mahdia, Gabes, Sfax, and the island of Jerba.

The Kingdom of Africa was an extension of the frontier zone of the Siculo-Norman state in the former Roman province of Africa (Note: Before it was finally conquered by the Muslims, this province was reorganised as the Byzantine exarchate of Africa.) (Ifrīqiya in Tunisian Arabic), corresponding to Tunisia and parts of Algeria and Libya today. The main primary sources for the kingdom are Arabic (Muslim); the Latin (Christian) sources are scanter. According to Hubert Houben, since "Africa" was never mentioned in the royal title of the kings of Sicily, "one ought not to speak of a 'Norman kingdom of Africa'." Rather, "[Norman Africa] really amounted to a constellation of Norman-held towns along coastal Ifrīqiya."

The Sicilian conquest of Africa began under Roger II in 1146–48. Sicilian rule consisted of military garrisons in the major towns, exactions on the local Muslim population, protection of Christians and the minting of coin. The local aristocracy was largely left in place, and Muslim princes controlled the civil government under Sicilian oversight. Economic connections between Sicily and Africa, which were strong before the conquest, were strengthened, while ties between Africa and northern Italy were expanded. Early in the reign of William I, the "kingdom" of Africa fell to the Almohads (1158–60). Its most enduring legacy was the realignment of Mediterranean powers brought about by its demise and the Siculo-Almohad peace finalised in 1180.

=== Conquest of Tripoli and Mahdia ===
In 1142/3, Roger II attacked Tripoli, further south down the coast from Mahdia. In 1146 he besieged it and took it. The city had already been depleted by a series of famines and was practically in a state of civil war when Roger's troops assaulted it. It was still an important port on the sea route from the Maghreb to Egypt. Several of the minor emirs in the vicinity of Tripoli sought Sicilian overlordship after this. Yūsuf, the ruler of Gabès, wrote to Roger requesting "the robes and letter of appointment making me wāli of Gabès, and I shall be your deputy there, as are the Banū Matrūh who hold Tripoli from you." Roger complied and Yūsuf, in his new robes, read out the letter of appointment to an assemblage of notables. Gabès had long been an irritant to Mahdia, and al-Hasan of Mahdia attacked it and brought back Yūsuf to Mahdia, and stoned him to death. It is possible that Roger's attack on Mahdia in 1148 was a response to this insubordination on the part of its emir, but Ibn al-Athīr suggested that Roger was merely taking advantage of a famine in Africa, despite the fact that he had a treaty with al-Hasan until 1150.

In June 1148 Roger sent his admiral George of Antioch, a former Mahdian officer, against al-Hasan. Off the island of Pantelleria the Sicilian fleet encountered a Mahdia ship bearing some carrier pigeons. George had the birds sent home with false messages that the fleet was headed for Byzantium. When the Sicilians reached Mahdia on 22 June, the emir and his court fled the unprepared city leaving their treasure behind. This was seized as booty, but the Sicilians were given only two hours to plunder the city while its Muslim inhabitants took refuge in Christian homes and churches. Roger quickly issued a royal protection, or amān, to all the city's inhabitants. According to Ibn abī-Dīnār, George "restored both cities of Zawīla and Mahdiyya; lent money to the merchants; gave alms to the poor; placed the administration of justice in the hands of qadi acceptable to the population; and arranged well the government of these two cities." Food was released to encourage refugees to return.

On 1 July the city of Sousse (Susa), ruled by al-Hasan's son 'Ali, surrendered without a fight, and 'Ali fled to his father in Almohad Morocco. On 12 July Sfax fell after a short resistance. The Africans "were treated humanely" and an amān full of "fine promises" was granted for the entire province, according to Ibn al-Athīr. Ibn Khaldun, in his Kitab al-Ibar, records the abuse the Christians of Sfax heaped on their Muslim neighbours. The Banū Matrūh were left in power in Tripoli, and in Sfax Roger appointed Umar ibn al-Husayn al-Furrīānī, whose father was brought to Sicily as a hostage for his son's good behaviour. The Arabic sources are unanimous in presenting Umar's father as encouraging his son to rebel nonetheless. The town of Barasht (Bresk) and the isles of Kerkennah fell to Roger, as did the unruly desert tribes. After the brief period of conquest and acquisition, "the dominion of the Franks [Normans] extended from Tripoli to the borders of Tunis, and from the western Maghrib to Qayrawan".

=== Submission of Tunis and internal unrest ===
Roger became involved in a war with Byzantium after 1148, and so was unable to follow up his conquests with an attack on Tunis. In fear, the Tunisians sent grain to Sicily in hopes of averting an attack, according to Ibn Idhari. This should probably be seen as tribute and submission, since Ibn Idhar writes that Roger was still in power in the city when the Almohads attacked it in 1159, although he was in fact dead. The Venetian chronicler Andrea Dandolo is probably correct in asserting: "and the kings of Tunis paid him [Roger] tribute" (regemque Tunixii sibi tributarium fecit). Roger died in 1154, and was succeeded by his son William I, who continued to rule Africa. His accession was taken for an opportunity by the native officials, who clamoured for more powers to tax. The Arabic historians Ibn al-Athīr and Ibn Khaldun, both hoped that Roger would defend his African lands against Almohad extremism and intolerance. After his death, some Muslim officials demanded that sermons be preached against the Almohads in the mosques.

== Almohads (al-Muwahiddin) ==
The only strong Muslim power then in the Maghreb was at the newly emerging Almohads, led by their caliph a Berber Abd al-Mu'min. He responded in several military campaigns which by 1160 compelled the Normans to retreat back to Sicily. The Almohads were also successful in driving off incursions by the Ayyubids in the 1180s, although they managed to occupy southern coastal areas intermittently during this period.

=== Movement and Empire ===
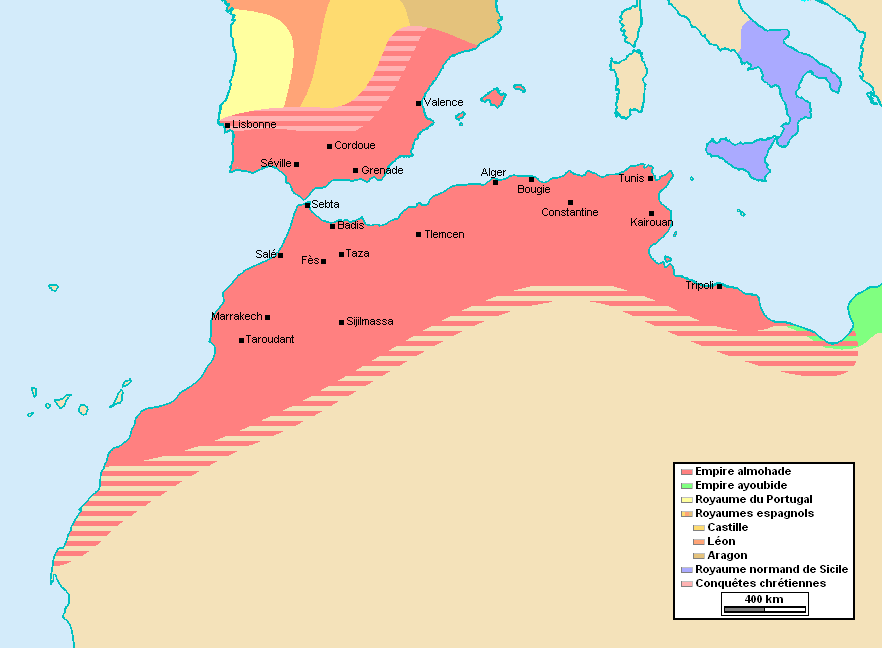
Almohad Empire (1147–1269) at it greatest extent

The Almohad movement [Arabic al-Muwahhidun, "the Unitarians"] ruled variously in the Maghrib starting about 1130 until 1248 (locally until 1275). (Note: "Almohad" is from the Spanish for the Arabic al-Muwahhidun.) This movement had been founded by Ibn Tumart (1077–1130), a Masmuda Berber from the Atlas mountains of Morocco, who became the mahdi. After a pilgrimage to Mecca followed by study, he had returned to the Maghrib about 1218 inspired by the teachings of al-Ash'ari and al-Ghazali. (Note: , stating at although Ibn Tumart was clearly influenced by al-Ghazali, the two never personally met (citing Goldziher).) A charismatic leader, he preached an interior awareness of the Unity of God. A puritan and a hard-edged reformer, he gathered a strict following among the Berbers in the Atlas, founded a radical community, and eventually began an armed challenge to the current rulers, the Almoravids (1056–1147). (Note: Le Tourneau reports (and criticizes) the story that the Almoravids (with Maliki legal backing) burned the book Revival of Religious Sciences by Al-Ghazali (1058–1111), which was said to have antagonized Ibn Tumart.) These Almoravids [Arabic al-Murabitun, from Ribat, e.g., "defenders"] had also been a Berber Islamic movement of the Maghrib, (Note: Predominantly of the Sanhaja confederacy of Berbers (then located across the far west Sahara), led particularly by the Lamtuna tribe.) (Note: Abun-Nasr compares the earlier Kharijites (since localized near Jerba in southern Tunisia), the Almoravids, and the Almohads, each a Berber movement rebellious against a lax Arab orthodoxy, each movement seeking to achieve "leading the Muslim good life [as] the professed aim of politics".) which had run its course and since become decadent and weak. Although the Almoravids had once ruled from Mauritania (south of Morocco) to al-Andalus (southern Spain), Almoravid rule had never reached to Ifriqiya.

Following Ibn Tumart's death, Abd al-Mu'min al-Kumi (c.1090–1163) became the Almohad caliph, circa 1130. (Note: Abd al-Mu'min was the first non–Arab to take the caliphal title amiral-mu'minin [commander of the faithful].) Abd al-Mu'min had been one of the original "Ten" followers of Ibn Tumart. He immediately had attacked the ruling Almoravids and had wrestled Morocco away from them by 1147, suppressing subsequent revolts there. Then he crossed the straits, occupying al-Andalus (in Spain). (Note: Unfortunately, as a result of the Almohad invasion, whose zealots forced many of the conquered to choose between conversion or flight, the family of the Jewish philosopher and Talmudist, Moshe ben Maimon, then thirteen, had to flee Córdoba in 1148, eventually finding safety in Fatimid Egypt. Isaac Husik, A History of Medieval Jewish Philosophy (Macmillan 1916, reprint Philadelphia 1940) p. 238.) (Note: Seventy years later in 1212 defeat at the Battle of Las Navas de Tolosa proved to be a turning point not only for the Almohads (then under Muhammad an-Nasir), but also for Muslim rule in Andalucia, España. Joseph Callaghan, A History of Medieval Spain (Cornell Univ. 1975) pp. 234, 245–249.) In 1152 he successfully invaded the Hammadids of Bougie (in Algeria). His armies intervened in Zirid Ifriqiya, removing the Christian Sicilians by 1160. Yet Italian merchants from Genoa and Pisa had already arrived, continuing the foreign presence. (Note: Italian merchants, as well as those of Aragon, came to predominate in the western Mediterranean trade of the Maghrib starting in the Almohad era.)

"Abd al-Mu'min briefly presided over a unified Northwest African empire––the first and last in its history under indigenous rule". It would be the high point of Maghribi political unity. Yet twenty years later, by 1184, the revolt by the Banu Ghaniya had spread from the Balearic Islands to Ifriqiya (Tunisia), causing problems for the Almohad regime for the next fifty years.

=== Rule of the Maghrib ===
Ibn Tumart, the Almohad founder, left writings in which his theological ideas mix with the political. Therein he claimed that the leader, the mahdi, is infallible. (Note: An idea some sunni condemn as unorthodox, i.e., as similar to the shi'a.) Ibn Tumart created a hierarchy from among his followers which persisted long after the Almohad era (i.e., in Tunisia under the Hafsids), based not only on a specie of ethnic loyalty, (Note: "Every member of the community had to belong to a tribe" under the control of their chief. Too, only Berbers of the Masmuda tribe could claim the title muwahiddin (Almohad).) such as the "Council of Fifty" [ahl al-Khamsin], and the assembly of "Seventy" [ahl al-Saqa], but more significantly based on a formal structure for an inner circle of governance at would transcend tribal loyalties, namely, (a) his ahl al-dar or "people of the house", a sort of privy council, (b) his ahl al-'Ashra or the "Ten", originally composed of his first ten followers, and (c) a variety of offices. Ibn Tumart trained his own talaba or ideologists, as well as his huffaz, who function was both religious and military. There is lack of certainty about some details, but general agreement at Ibn Tumart sought to reduce the "influence of the traditional tribal framework." Later historical developments "were greatly facilitated by his original reorganization because it made possible collaboration among tribes" not likely to otherwise coalesce. These organizing and group solidarity preparations made by Ibn Tumart were "most methodical and efficient" and a "conscious replica" of the Medina period of the prophet Muhammad.

The mahdi Ibn Tumart also had championed the idea of strict Islamic law and morals displacing unorthodox aspects of Berber custom. (Note: E.g., Ibn Tumart condemned unveiled women and musical instruments.) At his early base at Tinmal, Ibn Tumart functioned as "the custodian of the faith, the arbiter of moral questions, and the chief judge." Yet because of the narrow legalism then common among Maliki jurists and because of their influence in the Almoravid regime, (Note: In al-Andalus the Maliki school had turned inward to develop only those issues already present in its own fiqh; this had led to the burning of al-Ghazali's book) Ibn Tumart did not favor the Maliki school of law; nor did he favor any of the four recognized madhhabs. (Note: Compare: Marshall Hodgson states that the Almohads did follow the Zahiri madhhab. The Venture of Islam in II:269. The Zahiris, not one of the recognized four, taught a "literal" interpretation of the sources of law.) In practice, however, the Maliki school of law survived and by default eventually functioned in an official fashion (except during the reign of Abu Yusuf Ya'qubal-Mansur (1184–1199) who was loyal to Ibn Tumart's teachings). After of century of oscillation, the caliph Abu al-'Ala Idris al-Ma'mun broke with the narrow ideology of prior Almohad regimes (first articulated by the mahdi Ibn Tumart) at had continued to function on and off, and for the most part, at the end, poorly; circa 1230, he affirmed the reinstitution of the then-reviving Malikite rite, perennially popular in al-Maghrib.

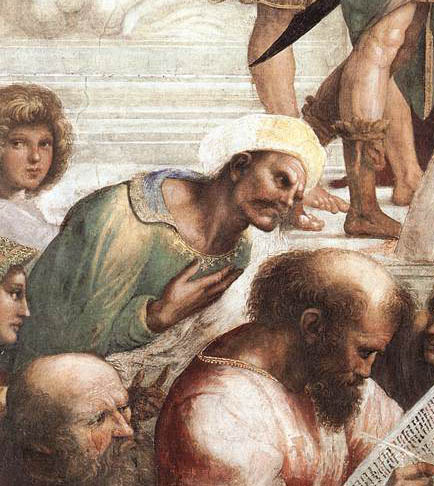
Ibn Rushd of Córdoba in detail from fresco The School of Athens by Raphael

The Muslim philosophers Ibn Tufayl (Abubacer to the Latins) of Granada (d.1185), and Ibn Rushd (Averroës) of Córdoba (1126–1198), who was also appointed a Maliki judge, were dignitaries known to the Almohad court, whose capital became fixed at Marrakesh. The sufi master theologian Ibn 'Arabi was born in Murcia in 1165. Under the Almohads architecture flourished, the Giralda being built in Seville and the pointed arch being introduced.

"There is no better indication of the importance of the Almohad empire than the fascination it has exerted on all subsequent rulers in the Maghrib." It was an empire Berber in its inspiration, and whose imperial fortunes were under the direction of Berber leaders. The unitarian Almohads had gradually modified the original ambition of strictly implementing their founder's designs; in this way the Almohads were similar to the preceding Almoravids (also Berber). Yet their movement probably worked to deepen the religious awareness of the Muslim people across the Maghrib. Nonetheless, it could not suppress other traditions and teachings, and alternative expressions of Islam, including the popular cult of saints, the sufis, as well as the Maliki jurists, survived. (Note: Cf.,) (Note: Sufis mystical orders spread after the collapse of the Almohad regime.)

The Almohad empire (like its predecessor the Almoravid) eventually weakened and dissolved. Except for the Muslim Kingdom of Granada, Spain was lost. In Morocco, the Almohads were to be followed by the Merinids; in Ifriqiya (Tunisia), by the Hafsids (who claimed to be the heirs of the unitarian Almohads).

== Hafsid dynasty of Tunis ==
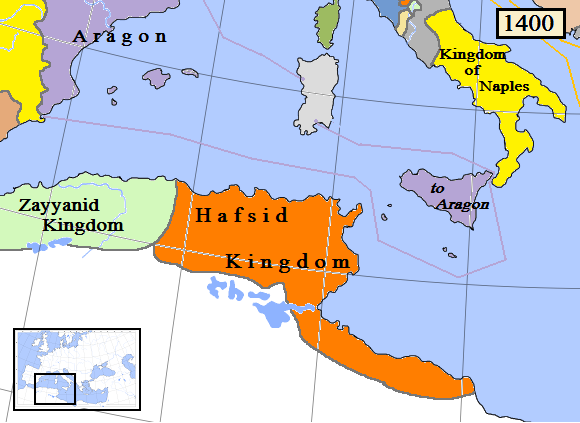
Realm of the Hafsid dynasty in 1400 (orange)

The Hafsid dynasty (1230–1574) succeeded Almohad rule in Ifriqiya, with the Hafsids claiming to represent the true spiritual heritage of its founder, the Mahdi Ibn Tumart (c.1077–1130). Under the Hafsids, Tunisia would eventually regain for a time cultural primacy in the Maghrib.

=== Political chronology ===
Abu Hafs 'Umar Inti (or:al-Hintati) (Note: Not to be confused with Abu Hafs 'Umar, son of the first Almohad caliph 'Abd al-Mu'min (r.1132–1163), his vizier, and brother of the next caliph Abu Ya'qub Yusuf (r.1163–1184). cf.,) was one of the Ten, the crucial early adherents of the Almohad movement [al-Muwahhidun], circa 1121. These Ten were companions of Ibn Tumart the Mahdi, and formed an inner circle consulted on all important matters. Abu Hafs 'Umar Inti, wounded in battle near Marrakesh in 1130, was for a long time a powerful figure within the Almohad movement. His son 'Umar al-Hintati was appointed by the Almohad caliph Muhammad an-Nasir as governor of Ifriqiya in 1207 and served until his death in 1221. His son, the grandson of Abu Hafs, was Abu Zakariya.

Abu Zakariya (1203–1249) served the Almohads in Ifriqiya as governor of Gabès, then in 1226 as governor of Tunis. In 1229 during disturbances within the Almohad movement, Abu Zakariya declared his independence: hence, the start of the Hafsid dynasty. In the next few years he secured his hold on the cities of Ifriqiya, then captured Tripolitania (1234) to the east, and Algiers (1235) to the west and later added Tlemcen (1242). He solidified his rule among the Berber confederacies. Government structure of the Hafsid state followed the Almohad model, a rather strict centralization. Abu Zakariya's succession to the Almohads was briefly acknowledged in Friday prayer by several states in al-Andalus and in Morocco. Diplomatic relations were opened with Venice, Genoa, Sicily, and Aragon. Abu Zakariya became the foremost ruler in the Maghrib.

For an historic moment, the son of Abu Zakariya and self-declared caliph of the Hafsids, al-Mustansir (Note: The honorific surname of al-Mustansir was given to Abu 'Abd Allah, son of Au Zakariya. (In Tunisian history there was earlier another Abu 'Abd Allah, namely the Isma'ili dai who prepared the way for the Fatimid Mahdi; and there was also another Fatimid caliph known as al-Mustansir.)) (r.1249–1277), was recognised as caliph by Mecca and the Islamic world (1259–1261), following termination of the Abbasid caliphate by the Mongols (in 1258). Yet the moment passed; the Hafsids remained a local sovereignty.

In 1270 King Louis IX of France, whose brother was the king of Sicily, landed an army near Tunis; disease devastated their camp. Later, Hafsid influence was reduced by the rise of the Moroccan Marinids of Fez, who captured and lost Tunis twice (1347, and 1357). Yet Hafsid fortunes would recover; two notable rulers being Abu Faris (1394–1434) and his grandson Abu 'Amr 'Uthman (r. 1435–1488).

Toward the end, internal disarray within the Hafsid dynasty created vulnerabilities, while a great power struggle arose between Spaniard and Turk over control of the Mediterranean. The Hafsid dynasts became pawns, subject to the rival strategies of the combatants. By 1574 Ifriqiya had been incorporated into the Ottoman Empire.

=== Commerce and Trade ===
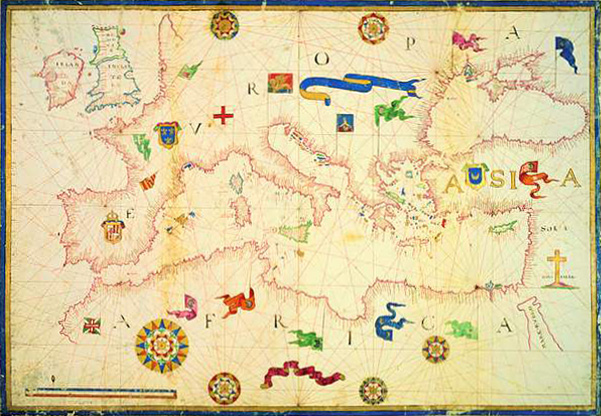
Bacino del Mediterraneo, dall'Atlante manoscritto del 1582–1584 ca. Biblioteca Nazionale Centrale Vittorio Emanuele II, Roma (cart. naut. 2 – cart. naut 6/1–2)

The entire Maghrib, as well as Tunisia under the early Hafsids, enjoyed an era of prosperity due to the rise of Saharan-Sudanese as well as the Mediterranean trade, the latter including trade with Europe. Across the region, repeated buy and sell dealings with Christians led to the development of practices and structured arrangements at were crafted to ensure security, customs revenue, and commercial profit. (Note: Two commercial letters originally in Arabic sent from Tunis and addressed to merchants of Pisa, dated 1201, can be found in Robert S. Lopez and Irving W. Raymond, Medieval Trade in the Mediterranean World. Illustrative documents translated with introductions and notes (Columbia Univ. 1955, 2001) pp. 384–388 'Solidarity of Muslim and Christian Merchants,' docs. no. 190 and no. 191.) The principal customs ports were then: Tunis, Sfax, Mahdia, Jerba, and Gabés (in modern Tunisia); Oran, Bougie (Bejaia), and Bône (Annaba) (in modern Algeria); and Tripoli (in modern Libya). Generally at such ports, the imports were off loaded and transferred to a customs area from where they were deposited in a sealed warehouse, or funduq, until the duties and fees were paid. The Tunis customs service was a stratified bureaucracy. At its head was often a member of the ruling nobility or musharif, called al-Caid, who not only managed the staff collecting duties but also might negotiate commercial agreements, conclude treaties, and would act as judge in legal disputes involving foreigners. The amount of the duties varied, usually five or ten percent. It was possible for an arriving ship to deliver its goods and pick up the return cargo in several days time. Christian merchants of the Mediterranean, usually organized by their city–of–origin, set up and maintained their own trading facilities in these North African customs ports to handle the flow of merchandise and marketing.

Islamic law during this era had developed a specific institution to regulate community morals, or hisba, which included the order and security of public markets, the supervision of market transactions, and related matters. The urban marketplace [Arabic souk, pl. iswak] was generally a street of shops selling the same or similar commodities (vegetables, cloth, metalware, lumber, etc.). (Note: In the villages and rural areas, there was generally a market day each week at a fixed location for trading and bartering) The city official charged with these responsibilities was called the muhtasib. In effecting public order in the urban markets, the muhtasib enforced fair commercial dealing (merchants truthfully quoting the local price to rural people, honest weights and measures, but not quality of goods nor price per se), keeping roadways open, regulating the safety of building construction, ensuring the metal value of existing coinage and minting new coin. The authority of the muhtasib, with his group of assistants, was somewhere between a qadi (judge) and the police, or on other occasions perhaps between a public prosecutor or trade commissioner and the mayor or a high city official. Often a leading judge or mufti held the position. The muhtasib did not hear contested litigation, but nonetheless could order the pain and humiliation of up to 40 lashes, remand to debtor's prison, order a shop closed, and expel from the city. The authority of the muhtasib did not extend into the countryside.

During this period from al-Andalus came Muslim and Jewish immigrants with appreciated talents, e.g., trade connections, crafts, and agricultural techniques. Regarding general prosperity, however, there was a sharp economic decline starting in the fourteenth century due to a variety of factors. (Note: E.g.) Later, Mediterranean trade gave way to corsair raiding activity. {IN PROGRESS}

=== Society and culture ===
As a result of the initial prosperity, al-Mustansir transformed his capital Tunis, constructing a palace and the Abu Fihr park; he also created an estate near Bizerte (said by Ibn Khaldun to be without equal in the world). An unfortunate divide, however, developed between the governance of the cities and of the countryside; at times the city-based rulers would grant rural tribes autonomy ('iqta') in exchange for their support in intra-maghribi struggles. This tribal independence of the central authority meant also at when the center grew weak, the periphery might still remain strong and resilient. (Note: Cf.,) {IN PROGRESS}

Bedouin Arabs (Note: Here, the Banu Suaim. Most of the Banu Hilal had by this period moved on to Morocco.) continued to arrive into the 13th century; with their tribal ability to raid and war still intact, they remained influential. The Arab language came to be predominant, except for a few Berber-speaking areas, e.g., Kharijite Djerba, and the desert south. Also, Arab Muslim and Jewish migration continued to come into Ifriqiya from al-Andalus, especially after the fall of Granada in 1492, the last Muslim state ruling on the Iberian peninsula. These newly arriving immigrants brought infusions of the developed arts of al-Andalus. The Andalusian tradition of music and poetry was discussed by Ahmad al-Tifashi (1184–1253) of Tunis, in his Muta'at al-Asma' fi 'ilm al-sama' [Pleasure to the Ears, on the Art of Music], in volume 41 of his enciclopedia.

After a hiatus under the Almohads, (Note: Ibn Tumart is said not to have followed any recognized madhhab [see the Almohads or al-Muwahiddin era, the Rule over the Maghrib section, above]; yet the Almohads may have followed the Zahiri school of law (Hodgson, Venture of Islam in II:269), which is now extinct.) the Maliki school of law resumed its full traditional jurisdiction over the Maghrib. During the 13th century, the Maliki school had undergone substantial liberalizing changes due in part to Iraqi influence. (Note: Maghribi students were drawn to Iraq by the teachings left by Fakhr al-Din al-Razi (d.1209). By the end of the 13th century, Ibn Zaytun Haskuni Mishaddali had introduced transformations in Maliki fiqh which were incorporated in the Hafsid restoration.) Under Hafsid jurisprudents the concept of maslahah or "public interest" developed in the operation of their madhhab. This opened up Maliki fiqh to considerations of necessity and circumstance with regard to the general welfare of the community. By this means, local custom was admitted in the Sharia of Malik, to become an integral part of the legal discipline. Later, the Maliki theologian Muhammad ibn 'Arafa (1316–1401) of Tunis studied at the Zaituna library, said to contain 60,000 volumes.

Education was improved by the institution of a system of madrasah. Sufism, e.g., Sidi Bin 'Arus (d. 1463 Tunis) founder of the Arusiyya tariqah, became increasingly established, linking city and countryside. (Note: The sufi shaikhs assumed the religious authority once held by the unitarian Almohads, according to) Poetry blossomed, as did architecture. For the moment, Tunisia had regained cultural leadership of the Maghrib.

=== Ibn Khaldun ===
A major social philosopher, Ibn Khaldun (1332–1406) is recognized as a pioneer in sociology, historiography, and related disciplines. Although having Yemeni ancestry, his family enjoyed centuries-long residency in al-Andalus before leaving in the 13th century for Ifriqiyah. As a native of Tunis, he spent much of his life under the Hafsids, whose regime he served on occasion.

Ibn Khaldun entered into a political career early on, working under a succession of different rulers of small states, whose designs unfolded amid shifting rivalries and alliances. at one point he rose to vizier; however, he also spent a year in prison. His career required several relocations, e.g., Fez, Granada, eventually Cairo where he died. In order to write he retired for a while from active political life. Later, after his pilgrimage to Mecca, he served as Grand Qadi of the Maliki rite in Egypt (he was appointed and dismissed several times). While he was visiting Damascus, Tamerlane took the city; the conqueror interviewed the elderly jurist and social philosopher, yet Ibn Khaldun managed to escape back to his life in Egypt.

The history and historiography written by Ibn Khaldun was informed in theory by his learning as a faylasuf [philosopher]. (Note: Muhsin Mahdi understands that he was influenced directly by Fakhr al-Din al-Razi (d.1209) of Iraq, and at least indirectly by al-Farabi, Ibn Sina, and Ibn Rushd. Erwin Rosenthal (Political Thought in Medieval Islam (1958) pp. 104–105) states that he favored and shared the views of al-Ghazali.) Yet it was his participation in the small unstable governments of the region at inspired many of his key insights. His history seeks to account for the apparent cyclical progression of historical states of the Maghrib, whereby: (a) a new ruling association comes to power with strong loyalties, (b) which over the course of several generations fall apart, (c) leading to the collapse of the ruling strata. The social cohesion necessary for the group's initial rise to power, and for the group's ability to maintain it and exercise it, Ibn Khaldun called Asabiyyah. (Note: Heinrich Simon, Ibn Khalduns Wissenschaft von der Menschlichen Kultur (Leipzig 1959), translated by Fuad Baali as Ibn Khaldun's Science of Human Culture (Lahore: Ashraf 1978) pp. 68–88, presents a discussion of this key concept, wherein asab means "to bind", asabatun means "the group", asabah means the "paternal relationship" in the law of inheritance [p. 68, 68n1], and asabiyah means "the nature of the group" [68–69].)

His seven-volume Kitab al-'Ibar [Book of Examples] (Note: Muhsin Mahdi, in, discusses the subtleties of this title. Ibar can mean "instructive examples" [64], "bridge" or medium of explanation [66], or "bridge between meanings" [71].) (shortened title) is a telescoped "universal" history, which concentrates on the Persian, Arab, and Berber civilizations. Its lengthy prologue, called the Muqaddimah [Introduction], presents the development of long-term political trends and events as a field for the study, characterizing them as human phenomena, in quasi-sociological terms. It is widely considered to be a gem of sustained cultural analysis. Due to his downplaying (or denying) the role of the ethnic Arab people in the development of Islamic science, philosophy and politics, Ibn Khaldun did not attract sufficient interest among Arabs, his studies being neglected in Ifriqiyah—a trend that has lasted to the present day as his works are considered politically incorrect vis a vis Arab nationalism. However and naturally, in the Persian and Turkish worlds he acquired a sustained following.

In the later books of the Kitab al-'Ibar, he focuses especially on the history of the Berbers of the Maghrib. The perceptive Ibn Khaldun in his narration eventually arrives at historical events he himself witnessed or encountered. (Note: There is said to be danger in contemporary use of his local histories, because Ibn Khaldun reluctantly employed highly nuanced "folk Maghribi archetypes" at conflate Berber and Arab tribal identities with static genres de vie (socio-economic lifestyles), creating "mythological entities" and a chaos of meaning. Aziz al-Azmeh, Ibn Khaldun in Modern Scholarship (London 1981) pp. 215–222. Compare:) As an official of the Hafsids, Ibn Khaldun experienced first hand the effects on the social structure of troubled regimes and the long-term decline in the region's fortunes.

== Ottoman Caliphate, and the Beys ==
Ottoman Empire (1299–1918), here to 1683

A long-term contest for the Mediterranean began in the sixteenth century, between Spaniards (who in 1492 completed the reconquista) and Turks (who had captured Constantinople in 1453). Spain then occupied a series of ports in Northwest Africa, e.g., Oran (1505), Tripoli (1510), Tunis (1534). Some Muslim rulers encouraged Turkish forces to enter the area in order to counter the Spanish presence. The Hafsids of Tunis, however, saw in the Muslim Turks a greater threat and arranged a Spanish alliance. (Note: Cf.,) (Note: Spain also had a tacit alliance with the Sa'dids of Morocco.)

The Ottoman Empire accepted many corsairs as their agents, who made Algiers their base, including Khair al-Din [Arabic name] and his brother Aruj (both known for red beards and called Barbarossa), (Note: The brothers hailed from the Greek island of Lesbos (Medelli). Wm. Spencer, Algiers in the Age of the Corsairs (Oklahoma Univ. 1976) p. 18.) and Uluj Ali. (Note: Uluj Ali, also spelled Ochiali, was a renegade of Italian (Neapolitan, Calabrian) origin. Later from the Sultan he received the name Kilij [Turkish for "sword"]. J.P.D.B.Kinross, The Ottoman Centuries. The Rise and Fall of the Turkish Empire (New York: Wm. Morrow, Quill 1977) p. 271.) In 1551 the corsair Dragut was installed in Tripoli; he entered Kairouan in 1558. Then in 1569 Uluj Ali, advancing from Algiers, seized Tunis. After the Christian naval victory at Lepanto in 1571, (Note: The combined fleets of various Christian powers, including Spain as well as Venice and Genoa, under the leadership of Don Juan of Austria (half-brother of Philip II of Spain) met and defeated the Turkish fleet off the coast of western Greece. Algerian ships under Uluj Ali escaped. J.Beeching, The Galleys at Lepanto (New York: Scribner's 1982) pp. 184–187, 219, 233–234.) Don Juan of Austria retook Tunis for Spain in 1573. Uluj Ali returned in 1574 with a large fleet and army to capture Tunis with finality, and then sent the last Hafsid to Constantinople.

=== Janissary Deys ===
Following imposition in 1574 of permanent Ottoman imperial rule, government in Tunisia was put on a more stable footing after a long period of flux and chaos. The Porte in Constantinople appointed a Pasha as the civil and military authority in Tunisia, which was made a province of the empire. Turkish became the language of the state. The capital city of Tunis was originally garrisoned with 4,000 Janissaries, recruited primarily from Anatolia, commanded by an Agha. The Porte did not maintain the ranks of Janissaries, rather the Pasha in Tunisia himself began to recruit such soldiery from many different regions. From 1574 to 1591 a council (the Diwan), composed of senior military (buluk-bashis) and local notables, advised the provincial government.

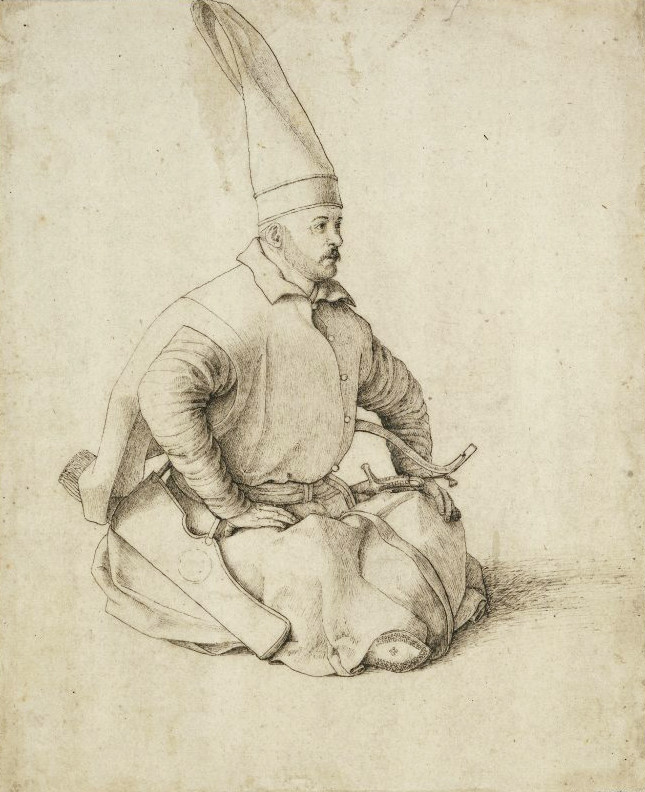
A Janissary, drawing by Gentile Bellini (15th century)

The new energy of Turkish rule was welcome in Tunis, and by the ulama. Although the Ottomans preferred the Hanifi school of law, some Tunisian Maliki jurists were admitted into the administration. Yet the rule remained one of a foreign elite. In the countryside, efficient Turkish troops managed to control the tribes without compromising alliances, but their rule was unpopular. The rural economy was never brought under effective regulation by the central authority. For revenues the government continued to rely primarily on corsair raiding in the Mediterranean.

In 1591 Janissary junior officers (deys) who were not of Turkish origin forced the Pasha to acknowledge the authority of one of their own men, called the Dey (elected by his fellow deys). Relatively independent of the Ottomans, the Dey exercised control in the cities. 'Uthman Dey (1598–1610) and Yusuf Dey (1610–1637) managed well enough to establish peace and order in place of chronic social turbulence.

In the tribal rural areas, control and collection of taxes were assigned to a chieftain, called the Bey [Turkish]. Twice a year, armed expeditions (mahallas) patrolled the countryside, showing the arm of the central authority. As an auxiliary force, the Beys organized rural cavalry (sipahis), mostly Arab, recruited from what came to be called the "government" (makhzan) tribes.

=== Muradid Beys ===
The Corsican Murad Curso (Note: His second name "Curso" indicates his Corsican origin. A Spanish intelligence report of 1568 estimated there were 10,000 renegades in Algiers, of whom 6,000 were Corsicans. Fernand Braudel, The Mediterranean and the Mediterranean World (1949, 1966, 1973) pp. I: 159–160.) (d. 1631) had since his youth been sponsored by Ramdan Bey (d. 1613). Murad then followed his benefactor into the office of the Bey, which he exercised effectively; later he was also named Pasha, although his position remained inferior to the Dey. His son Hamuda (1631–1666) inherited both titles, with the support of the local notables of Tunis. By virtue of his title as Pasha, the Bey came to enjoy the prestige of connection with the Sultan-Caliph in Constantinople. In 1640, upon the death of the Dey, Hamuda Bey maneuvered to establish his control over appointments to at office.

Under Murad II Bey (1666–1675), son of Hamuda, the Diwan again functioned as a council of notables. Yet in 1673 the janissary deys, seeing their power ebbing, rose in revolt. During the consequent fighting, the urban forces of the janissary deys fought against the Muradid Beys with their largely rural forces under the tribal shaykhs, and with popular support from city notables. As the Beys secured victory, so did the rural Bedouins and the Tunisian notables, who also emerged triumphant. The Arabic language returned to local official use, although the Muradids continued to use Turkish in the central government, accentuating their elite status and Ottoman connection.

At Murad II Bey's death, internal discord with the Muradid family led to armed struggle. The Turkish rulers of Algeria later intervened on behalf of one side in a subsequent domestic conflict; the Algerian forces did not withdraw and proved unpopular. This unfortunate condition of civil discord and Algerian interference persisted. The last Muradid Bey was assassinated in 1702 by Ibrahim Sharif, who then ruled for several years with Algerian backing.

A gradual economic shift occurred during the Muradid era, as corsair raiding decreased due to pressure from Europe, and commercial trading based on agricultural products (chiefly grains) increased due to an integration of the rural population into regional networks. Mediterranean trade, however, continued to be carried by European shipping concerns. The Beys, in order to derive the maximum advantage from the export trade, in addition to taxation instituted government monopolies which mediated between the local producers and foreign merchants. As a result, the rulers and their business partners (drawn from foreign-dominated elites connected to the Ottomans) took a disproportionate share of Tunisia's trading profits. (Note: Government control of the economic wealth was evidently common in the region during the 16th century. Cf., Fernand Braudel, The Mediterranean and the Mediterranean World (1949, 1966, 1973) pp. I: 449–451. From such systematic policy in practice would later emerge the Mercantilist economic theory.) This precluded the development of local interests, whether rural landowners or a wealthy merchant strata. A social divide persisted, with the important families in Tunisia identified as a "Turkish" ruling caste.

=== Husaynid Beys ===
The Husaynid Beys ruled from 1705 to 1881, and reigned until 1957. In theory, Tunisia continued as a vassal of the Ottoman empire (the Friday prayer was pronounced in the name of the Ottoman Sultan, money was coined in his honor, and an annual ambassador brought gifts to Istanbul) but the Ottomans never were able to depend on, or exact, obedience.

Husayn ibn Ali (1669–1740), a cavalry officer of Greek Cretan origin, came into power in 1705, remaining in control until 1735. He had won backing from the Tunisian ulama and notables, as well as from the tribes, for his opposition to Algerian influence which was removed. Yet in a succession dispute, his nephew Ali and his son Muhammad fought a divisive civil war, which ended in 1740 with Ali's uncertain victory. This result was reversed in 1756 after ten more years of fighting, but not without meddling by Algeria.

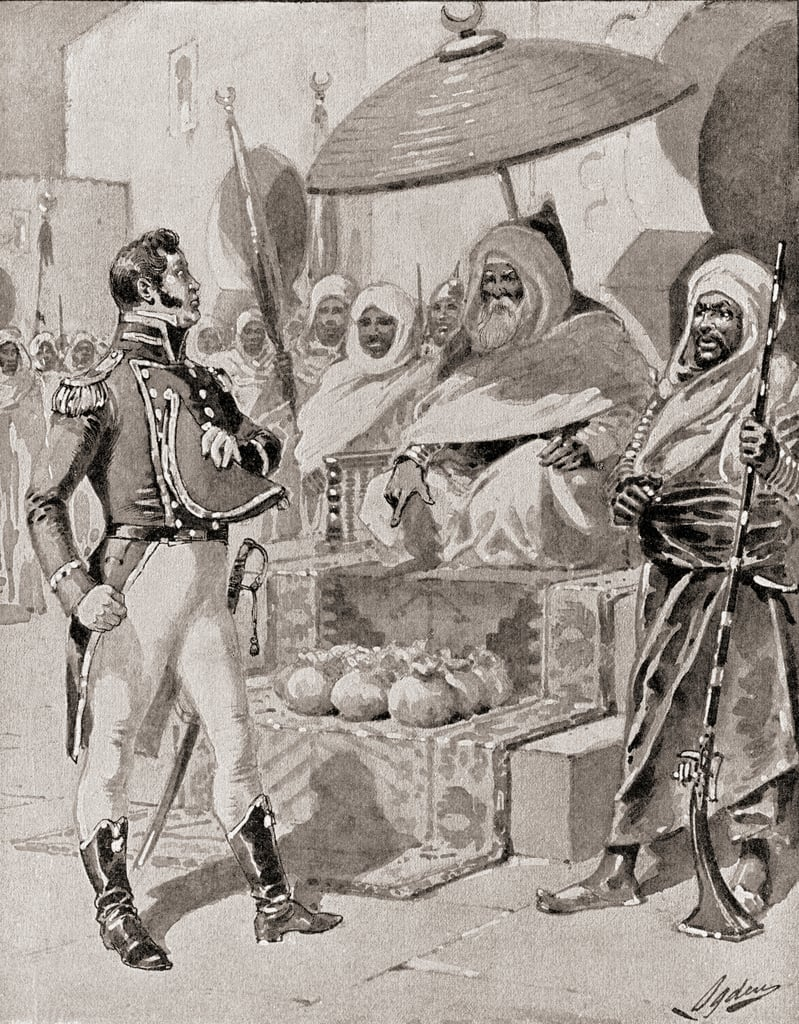
Captain William Bainbridge (U.S.A.) with tribute for the Dey of Algiers in 1800; the Pasha of Tripoli declared war in 1801.

Early Husaynid policy required a careful balance among several divergent parties: the Ottomans, the Turkish speaking elite in Tunisia, and local Tunisians, both urban and rural, notables and clerics, landowners and the more remote tribes. Entanglement with the Ottoman Empire was avoided due to its potential ability to take over the Bey's prerogatives; however, religious ties to the Caliph were fostered, adding prestige to the Beys and winning approval of the local ulama and deference from the notables. Janissaries were still recruited, but increasing reliance was placed on tribal forces. Turkish was spoken at the apex, but use of Arabic increased in government use. Kouloughlis (children of mixed Turkish and Tunisian parentage) and native Tunisians notables were given increased admittance into higher positions and deliberations. Yet the Husaynid Beys did not themselves intermarry with Tunisians; instead they often turned to the institution of mamluks. (Note: In Tunisian practice, non-Muslim slave youths were purchased in Ottoman markets, educated with royal scions in high government service and in Islam, converted, given high echelon positions, and often married to royal daughters. Mamluks would number about 100.) The dynasty never ceased to identify as Ottoman, and therefore privileged. Nonetheless, the local ulama were courted, with funding for religious education and the clerics. Maliki jurist entered government service. Rural marabouts were mollified. Tribal shaykhs were recognized and invited to conferences. Especially favored were a handful of prominent families, Turkish speaking, who were given business and land opportunities, as well as important posts in the government, depending on their loyalty.

The French Revolution and reactions to it caused disruptions in European economic activity which provided opportunities for Tunisia to profit handsomely. Hammouda Pasha (1781–1813) was Bey during this period of prosperity; he also turned back an Algerian invasion in 1807, and quelled a janissary revolt in 1811.

After the Congress of Vienna in 1815, Britain and France secured the Bey's agreement to cease sponsoring or permitting corsair raids, which had resumed during the Napoleonic conflict. Then in the 1820s economic activity in Tunisia took a steep downturn. The Tunisian government was particularly affected due to its monopoly positions regarding many exports. Credit was obtained to weather the deficits, but eventually the debt would grow to unmanageable levels. Foreign business interests increasingly exercised control over domestic commerce. Foreign trade proved to be a Trojan Horse.

Under the French Protectorate (1881–1956) the Husaynid Beys continued in a largely ceremonial rôle. Following independence, a republic was declared in 1957; the Beylical office was terminated and the Husaynid dynasty came to an end.

=== Era of Reform ===
In the 19th century under the Husaynid Beyds, commerce with the Europeans increased, with permanent residences established by many foreign merchants. In 1819 the Bey agreed to quit corsair raids. In 1830 the Bey also agreed to enforce in Tunisia the capitulation treaties between the Ottomans and various European powers, under which European consuls would act as judges in legal cases involving their nationals. During 1830 the French royal army occupied neighboring Algeria.

Ahmad Bey (1837–1855) assumed the throne during this complex situation. Following the examples of the Ottoman Empire under sultan Mahmud II, and of Egypt under Muhammad Ali, he moved to intensify a program to update and upgrade the Tunisian armed forces. In pursuit of this policy, he instituted a military school and started industries in order to supply its more modern army and navy. In a major step, he initiated the recruitment and conscription of native Tunisians to serve in the army and navy, a step which would reduce the long division between the state and its citizens. Yet the resulting tax increases were not popular.

Although desiring Ottoman support, repeatedly Ahmad Bey refused to apply in Tunisia the Ottoman legal reforms regarding citizen rights, i.e., the Tanzimat of 1839. Instead, he instituted progressive laws of his own, showing native Tunisian authority in the modernizing project and hence the redundancy of importing any Ottoman reforms. The Slave trade was abolished in 1841, slavery in 1846. Yet these legal reforms had limited application to many Tunisians. Ahmad Bey continued the general Beylical policy, i.e., to decline or reject political attachment to the Ottoman state, but welcome religious ties to the Ottoman Caliphate.

As part of his maneuvering to maintain Tunisia's sovereignty, Ahmad Bey sent 4,000 Tunisian troops against the Russian Empire during the Crimean War (1854–1856). In doing so he allied Tunisia with the Ottoman Empire, France, and Great Britain.

== Modernity and the French Protectorate ==
As the 19th century commenced, the country remained quasi-autonomous, although officially still an Ottoman province. Trade with Europe increased dramatically with western merchants arriving to establish businesses in the country. In 1861, Tunisia enacted the first constitution in the Arab world, but a move toward a modernizing republic was hampered by the poor economy and by political unrest. Loans made by foreigners to the government were becoming difficult to manage. In 1869, Tunisia declared itself bankrupt; an international financial commission, with representatives from France, the United Kingdom, and Italy, took control over the economy.

Initially, Italy was the country that demonstrated the most desire to have Tunisia as a colony having investment, citizens and geographic proximity as motivation. However, this was rebuffed when Britain and France co-operated to prevent this during the years 1871 – 1878 ending in Britain supporting French influence in Tunisia in exchange for dominion over Cyprus. France still had the issue of Italian influence (related to the huge colony of Tunisian Italians emigrated to Tunisia) and thus decided to find an excuse for a pre-emptive strike. In the spring of 1881, the French army occupied Tunisia, claiming that Tunisian troops had crossed the border to Algeria, France's primary colony in Northern Africa. Italy, also interested in Tunisia, protested, but did not risk a war with France. On May 12 of that year, Tunisia was officially made a French protectorate with the signature of the treaty of Bardo (Al Qasr as Sa'id)by Muhammad III as-Sadiq. This gave France control of Tunisian governance and making it a de facto French protectorate.

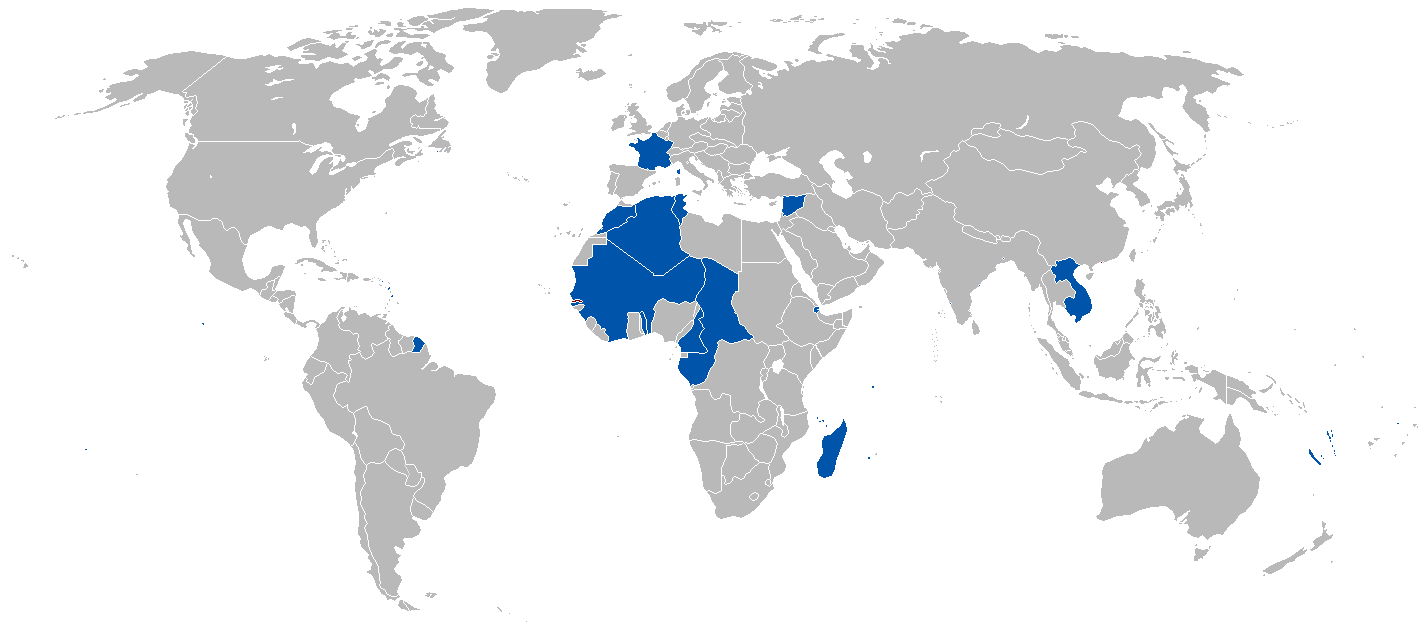
France's colonial empire at the time of French rule in Tunisia

The French progressively assumed more of the important administrative positions, and by 1884 they supervised all Tunisian government bureaus dealing with finance, post, education, telegraph, public works and agriculture. They decided to guarantee the Tunisian debt, and then abolished the international finance commission. French settlements in the country were actively encouraged; the number of French colonists grew from 34,000 in 1906 to 144,000 in 1945, occupying approximately one-fifth of the cultivated land. Roads, ports, railroads, and mines were developed. In rural areas the French administration strengthened the local officials (qa'ids) and weakened the independent tribes. An additional judicial system was established for Europeans but available generally, set up without interfering with the existing Sharia courts, available as always for the legal matters of Tunisians.

Share of Europeans during French rule in Tunisia

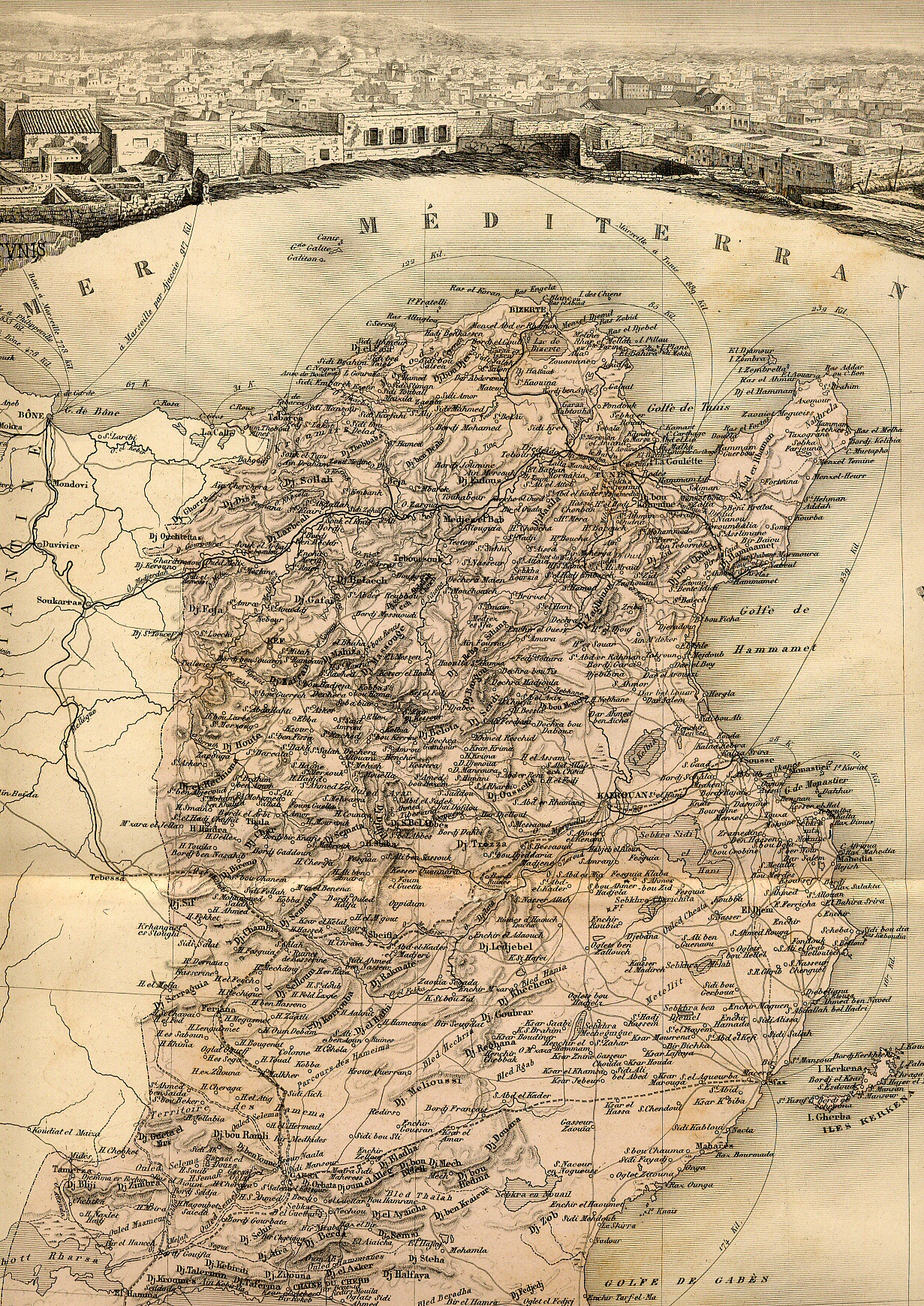
Map of Tunisia in 1902 with numerous railroads

Many welcomed the progressive changes, but preferred to manage their own affairs. Kayr al-Din in the 1860s and 1870s had introduced modernizing reforms before the French occupation. Some of his companions later founded the weekly magazine al-Hadira in 1888. A more radical one al-Zahra ran from 1890 until suppressed in 1896; as was the Sabil al-Rashad of 'Abd al-'Aziz al-Tha'alibi, who was inspired by Muhammad 'Abduh of Cairo, among others. Bashir Sfar initiated the discussion group Khalduniya in 1896. 'Ali Bash Hamba founded the French-language journal Tunisien to inform the French public of the Tunisian complaints, but only increased unrest. Tha'alibi founded the Arabic language Tunisien in 1909, to challenge Hamba from a Tunisian view point. In 1911 there were civil disturbances started within the universities. Hamba and Tha'alibi came together. A political party was begun, al-Ittihad al-Islami [Islamic Unity], which had pro-Ottoman leanings. Issues concerning a Muslim cemetery, the Jallaz, sparked large demonstrations which ended with martial law and the killing of many Tunisians in late 1911. Further demonstrations in 1912 led to the closing of the nationalist newspapers and the exiling of nationalist leadership.

Organized nationalist sentiment among Tunisians, driven underground in 1912, resurfaced after the great War. Encouragement came from many directions, e.g., the formation of the League of Nations in 1919. Nationalists established the Destour [Constitution] Party in 1920. Habib Bourguiba established and led its successor, the Neo-Destour Party, in 1934. French authorities later banned this new party, while the fascist organizations of the Tunisian Italians supported it (Mussolini obtained the liberation of Bourghiba from a Vichy jail in 1942).

During World War II, the French authorities in Tunisia supported the Vichy government which ruled France after its capitulation to Germany in 1940. After initial victories to the east the German General Erwin Rommel, (Note: Rommel later joined the German military's plot to kill Hitler; Rommel's preference was to arrest him and try him for war crimes. Wm. L. Shirer, Rise and Fall of the Third Reich (New York 1960) pp. 1030–1032.) lacking supplies and reinforcements, in 1942 lost the decisive battle of al-Alamein (near Alexandria in Egypt) to the British General Bernard Montgomery. After learning of Allied landings in the west (Operation Torch), the Axis army retreated westward to Tunisia and set up defensive positions. The British following on his heels eventually broke these lines, although Rommel did have some early success against the "green" American troops advancing from the west, until the arrival of General George Patton who stopped Rommel in battle. The fighting ended in May 1943. The German Afrika Corps surrendered on May 11. Two days later, on May 13, after the collapse of the 5th German Tank Army, the fall of Tunis and the surrounding of the 1st Italian Army, still holding the line at Enfidaville, the Italian general Messe formally surrendered to the Allies.

General Dwight D. Eisenhower (who earned trust by talking straight if not always clearly) stated at "far from governing a conquered country, we were attempting only to force a gradual widening of the base of government, with the final objective of turning all internal affairs over to popular control." Tunisia became a staging area for operations in the invasion of Sicily later at year.

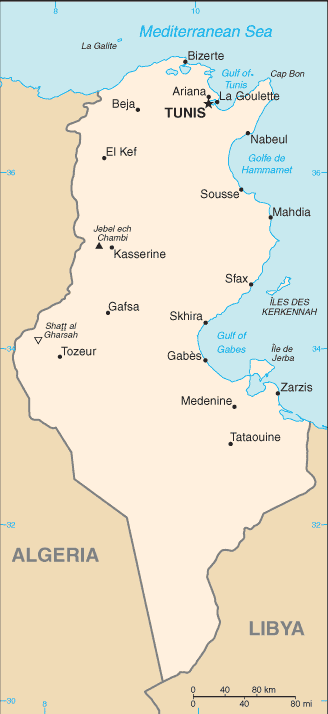
Map of modern Tunisia

After World War II, the struggle for national independence continued and intensified. The Neo-Destour Party reemerged under Habib Bourguiba. Yet with a lack of progress, violent resistance to French rule began in the mountains during 1954. The Tunisians coordinated with independence movements in Algeria and Morocco, although it was Tunisia that first became independent. Ultimately, the Neo-Destour Party managed to gain sovereignty for its people by maneuver and finesse.

== Tunisian Republic ==
Independence from France was achieved on March 20, 1956. The State was established as a constitutional monarchy with the Bey of Tunis, Muhammad VIII al-Amin Bey, as the king of Tunisia.

=== The Era of Habib Bourguiba ===
In 1957, the Prime Minister Habib Bourguiba (Habib Abu Ruqaiba) abolished the monarchy and firmly established his Neo Destour (New Constitution) party. The regime sought to run a strictly structured regime with efficient and equitable state operations, but not democratic-style politics. Also terminated was the bey, a quasi-monarchist institution dating back to Ottoman rule. Then Bourguiba commenced to dominate the country for the next 31 years, governing with thoughtful programs yielding stability and economic progress, repressing Islamic fundamentalism, and establishing rights for women unmatched by any other Arab nation. The vision at Bourguiba offered was of a Tunisian republic. The political culture would be secular, populist, and imbued with a kind of French rationalist vision of the state at was buoyant, touched with élan, Napoleonic in spirit. Bourguiba then saw an idiosyncratic, eclectic future combining tradition and innovation, Islam with a liberal prosperity. (Note: Habib Bourguiba has been compared to Atatürk (Mustafa Kemal) of Turkey, as a unique national modernizing leader. Yet, what may be called an inclination to arbitrary methods when making government decisions, and to a specie of personality cult, detracted from Bourguiba's insight and substantial achievements.)

"Bourguibism" was also resolutely nonmilitarist, arguing that Tunisia could never be a credible military power and that the building of a large military establishment would only consume scarce investment resources and perhaps thrust Tunisia into the cycles of military intervention in politics at had plagued the rest of the Middle East. In the name of economic development, Bourguiba nationalized various religious land holdings and dismantled several religious institutions. (Note: On the other hand, Bourguiba also negotiated with the Catholic Church; as a result Tunisia received scores of churches and land parcels to be used for libraries or museums, and the right to be consulted in the naming of future Church leaders. John K. Cooley, Baal, Christ, and Mohammad. Religion and Revolution in North Africa (Holt Rinehart Winston 1965) pp. 3–5, 297–298.)

Bourguiba's great asset was at "Tunisia possessed a mature nationalist organization, the Neo Destour Party, which on independence day held the nation's confidence in hand." It had made its case to the city workers in the modern economy and to country folk in the traditional economy; it had excellent leaders who commanded respect and who generally developed reasonable government programs.

In July 1961, when Tunisia imposed a blockade on the French naval base at Bizerte, hoping to force its evacuation, the crisis culminated in a three-day battle between French and Tunisian forces that left some 630 Tunisians and 24 French dead and eventually led to France ceding the city and naval base to Tunisia in 1963.

One serious rival to Habib Bourguiba was Salah Ben Yusuf. Exiled in Cairo during the early 1950s he had absorbed the pan-Arab nationalism associated with the Egyptian leader Gamal Abdul Nasser. Yet as a result of his strong opposition to the Neo Destour leadership during their negotiations with France for autonomy prior to independence, Ben Youssef was removed from his position as secretary-general and expelled from the party. Nonetheless, he rallied disaffected union members, students, and others, enough to put 20,000 yusufists into the street during the next congress of the Neo Destour party. Eventually he left Tunisia for Cairo. (Note: Ben Yusuf was assassinated in Egypt in 1961.) (Note: After 1987, Ben Yusuf was gradually "rehabilitated" and his body returned to Tunisia for burial.)

Socialism was not initially a major part of the Neo Destour project, but the government had always held and implemented redistributive policies. A large public works program was launched in 1961. Nonetheless, in 1964, Tunisia entered a short lived socialist era. The Neo Destour party became the Socialist Destour (Parti Socialiste Dusturien or PSD), and the new minister of planning, Ahmed Ben Salah, formulated a state-led plan for agricultural cooperatives and public-sector industrialization. The socialist experiment raised considerable opposition within Bourguiba's old coalition. Ahmed Ben Salah was eventually dismissed in 1970, and many socialized operations (e.g., the farm cooperatives) were returned to private ownership in the early 1970s. In 1978, a general strike was repressed by the government with its forces killing dozens; union leaders were jailed.

After independence, Tunisian economic policy had been primarily to promote light industry and tourism, and develop its phosphate deposits. The major sector remained agriculture with small farms prevailing, but these did not produce well. In the early 1960s the economy slowed down, but the socialist program did not prove to be the cure.

In the 1970s the economy of Tunisia expanded at a very healthy rate. Oil was discovered, and tourism continued. City and countryside populations drew roughly equal in number. Yet agricultural problems and urban unemployment led to increased migration to Europe.

=== The Era of Ben Ali ===
In the 1980s the economy performed poorly. In 1983 the International Monetary Fund (IMF) forced the government to raise the price of bread and semolina, causing severe hardship and protest riots. In this situation, the Islamic Tendency Movement (MTI) under Rached Ghannouchi provided popular leadership. Civil disturbances, including those by the Islamists, were repressed by government security forces under General Zine El Abidine Ben Ali. The government persisted in following its program; Ben Ali was named prime minister.

The 84-year-old president Bourguiba was overthrown and replaced by Ben Ali, his prime minister, on November 7, 1987. (Note: John P. Entelis, "Tunisia" pp. 532–533 in The Americana Annual 1988 (New York: Grolier). Ben Ali's background was said to be pro-Western, trained in military affairs by France and the U.S.; he had previously clamped down on both left and right opponents, especially Islamic fundamentalists. Ninety fundamentalists had been found guilty of bombing hotels earlier in 1987. Entelis (1987) pp. 532–533.) The new president changed very little in the Bourguibist political support system, except to rename the party the Constitutional Democratic Rally (RCD by its French acronym).

In 1988, Ben Ali tried a new tack with reference to the government and Islam, by attempting to reaffirm the country's Islamic identity; several Islamist activists were released from prison. He also forged a national pact with the Tunisian party Harakat al-Ittijah al-Islami (Islamic Tendency Movement), which had been founded in 1981; later it changed its name to an-Nahda (the Renaissance Party). But Ben Ali's innovative tack did not work out. Subsequently, An-Nahda claimed to have run strongly in the 1989 elections, which gave the appearance of being unfair; reports often described pro-government votes at over 90%. Ben Ali subsequently banned Islamist political parties and jailed as many as 8,000 activists.

In 2004, Ben Ali was re-elected President for a five-year term, with a reported 94.5% of the vote. Also elected were 189 members of the Majlis al-Nuwaab or Chamber of Deputies, with a five-year term. In addition, there was a Chamber of Advisors composed of 126 members with six-year terms, of whom 85 were elected by government subdivisions (e.g., municipalities), by professional associations, and by trade unions (14 union members boycotted the process); the remaining 41 members were appointed by the President. The court system remained a combination of French Civil Law and Islamic Sharia Law.

A widely supported human rights movement emerged, which included not only Islamists but also trade unionists, lawyers and journalists. Tunisia's political institutions, however, remained fixed in the authoritarian past. As of 2001, the government's response to calls for reform Included house arrests and prison. The government continued its refusal to recognize Muslim opposition parties, and governed the country in a political climate considered rigid, from time to time using objectionable military and police measures to repress dissent.

In foreign affairs, Tunisia continued to enjoy close ties to the West while broadly following a moderate, non-aligned stance. The Arab League was headquartered in Tunis from 1979 to 1991.

=== 2000s in Tunisia ===
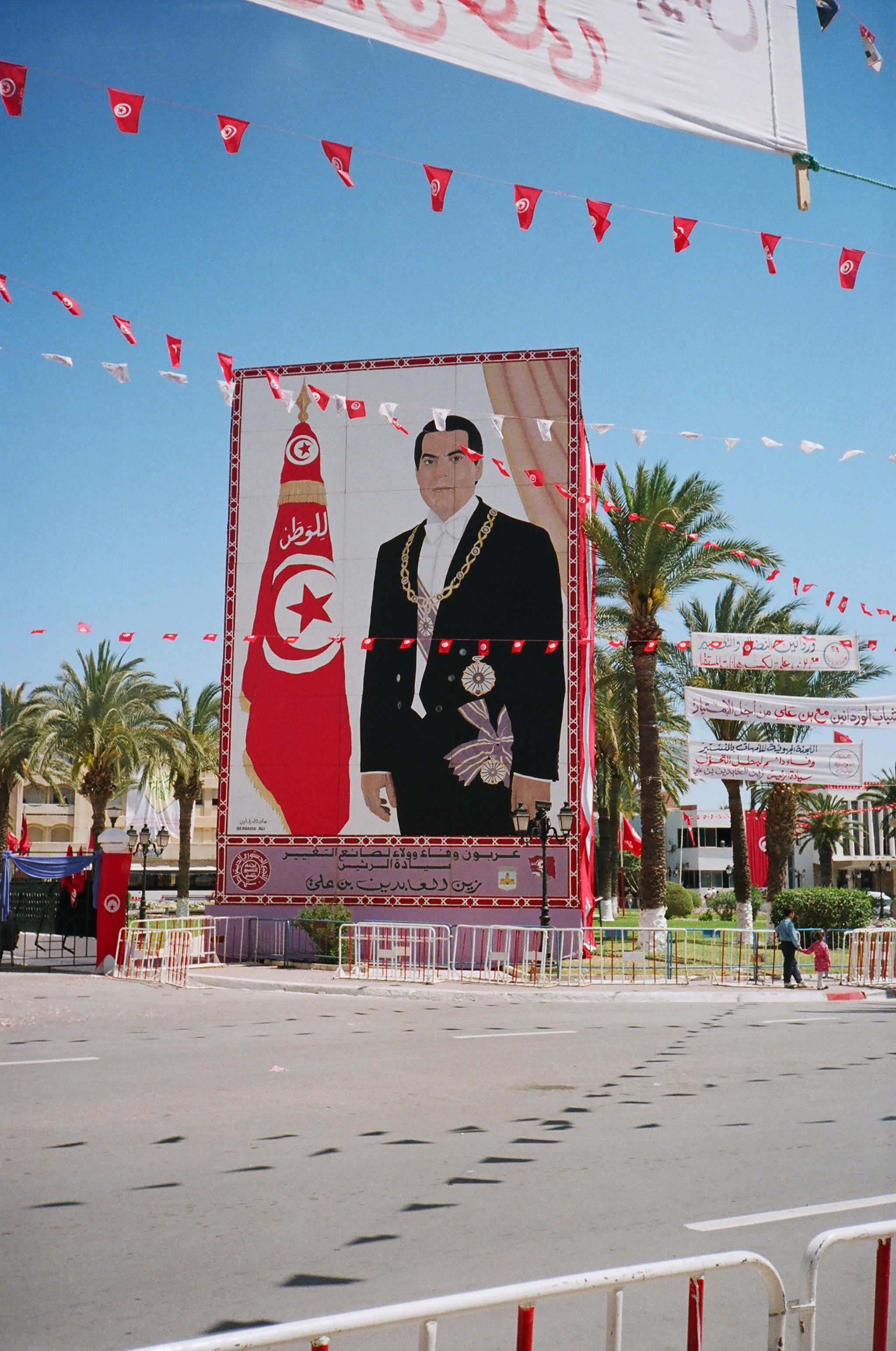
Large portrait of Ben Ali, 2008

Tunis, the capital, has a population of about 700,000, and the second city of Sfax approximately 250,000. The population growth rate measured as births per female has fallen from 7 (1960s) to 2 (2007). Life expectancy is female 75, male 72. The religion is Muslim (98%), with 1% Christian, and 1% Jewish and other. Required education is eight years. The official language is Arabic, with French also spoken particularly in commercial dealings, and with less than 2% Berber. Literacy by definition includes all over 15 years, and is overall 74%, male 83% and female 65%. In 2006, 7.3 million mobile phones were in use and 1.3 million were on the internet; there were 26 television stations and 29 radio stations. Over half the population is considered urban, with agricultural workers being about 30% of the total. Unemployment in 2000 was about 15.6%, and in 2006 about 13.9%. Over 300,000 Tunisians were reported to be residing in France during 1994. Left out of the recent prosperity were many rural and urban poor, including small businesses facing the world market.

The monetary unit is the dinar, at about 1.33 per dollar U.S.A. (recently a fairly constant rate), with inflation estimated pp. 4.5% for 2006. Tunisia's per capita annual income was approximately 8,900 dollars (U.S.A.) in 2006. Between 1988 and 1998 the economy more than doubled. The economy grew at 5% per year during the 1990s (the best in Northwest Africa), but hit a 15-year low of 1.9% in 2002 (due to drought and a decline in tourism), but it regained a 5% rate for 2003–2005; it was said to be 4%–5% for 2006. Tunisia's economy is diverse. Its products are primarily from light industry (food processing, textiles, footwear, agribusiness, mining commodities, construction materials) and from agriculture (olives, olive oil, grains (wheat and barley), tomatoes, citrus, sugar beets, dates, almonds, figs, vegetables, grapes, beef dairy), as well as livestock (sheep, goats) and fishing. Other production comes from petroleum and mining (phosphates, iron, oil, lead, zinc, salt). Tunisia is self-sufficient in oil, but not in natural gas. A very significant portion of the economy derives from the tourist industry. Gross Domestic Product (G.D.P.) was composed of approximately 12.5% agriculture, 33.1% industry, and 54.4% services. Exports went to France 29%, Italy 20%, Germany 9%, Spain 6%, Libya 5%, U.S.A. 4%. Imports came from France 25%, Italy 22%, Germany 10%, Spain 5%. An association agreement with the European Union will move Tunisia toward full free trade with the EU by 2008.

The face of the countryside changes markedly as one moves from north to south. In the north and central coast, orchards and fields predominate; while in the central plains, pasturage. Overall, arable land is 17%–19%, with forest and woodland 4%, permanent crops 13%, irrigated lands at 2.4%; about 20% is used for pasture. There are limited fresh water resources. In the south the environment grows increasingly arid, until the borderlands eventually reach into the Sahara desert. Roads total about 20,000 km., two-thirds being paved, with most of the unpaved roads lying in the desert south.

== The "Dignity Revolution" ==
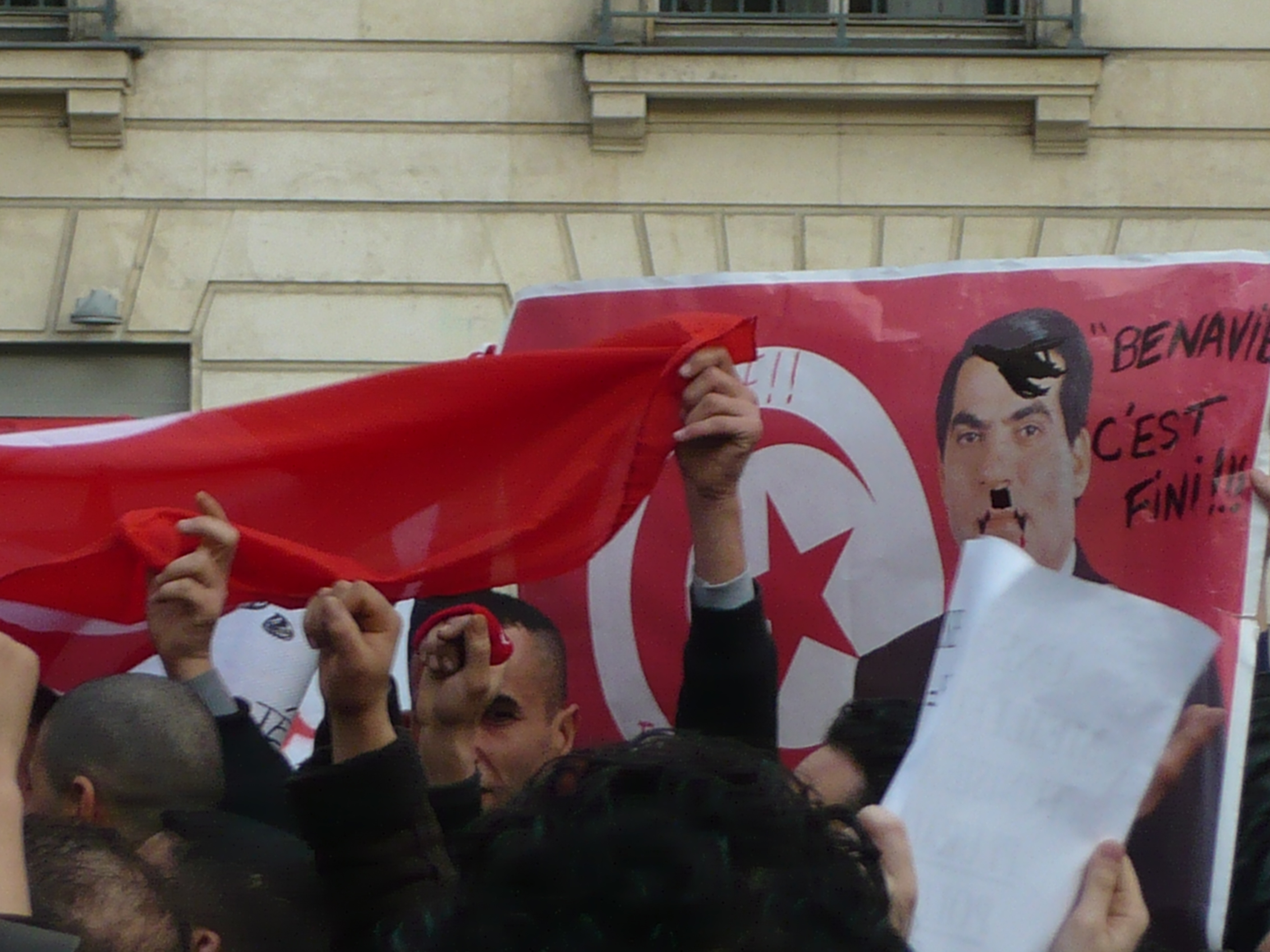
Anti-government protests in 2011

The Ben Ali regime came to an end following nationwide demonstrations precipitated by high unemployment, food inflation, corruption, a lack of political freedoms like freedom of speech and poor living conditions. The protests constituted the most dramatic wave of social and political unrest in Tunisia in three decades and resulted in scores of deaths and injuries, most of which were the result of action by police and security forces against demonstrators. The protests were sparked by the self-immolation of Mohamed Bouazizi on 17 December 2010 and led to the ousting of President Zine El Abidine Ben Ali 28 days later on 14 January 2011, when he officially resigned after fleeing to Saudi Arabia, ending 23 years in power. In the Western media, these events were commonly named the Jasmine Revolution, but the name was not generally adopted in Tunisia itself. where the name generally used is the Dignity Revolution (ثورة الكرامة) (Thawrat el-Karāma).

Following the overthrow of Ben Ali, Tunisians elected a Constituent Assembly to draft a new constitution, and an interim government known as the Troika because it was a coalition of three parties; the Islamist Ennahda Movement in the lead, with the centre-left Congress for the Republic and the left-leaning Ettakatol as minority partners. Widespread discontent remained however, leading to the 2013–14 Tunisian political crisis. As a result of the efforts made by the Tunisian National Dialogue Quartet, the Constituent Assembly completed its work, the interim government resigned, and new elections were held in 2014, completing the transition to a democratic state. The Tunisian National Dialogue Quartet was awarded the 2015 Nobel Peace Prize for "its decisive contribution to the building of a pluralistic democracy in Tunisia in the wake of the Tunisian Revolution of 2011".

== Presidency of Kais Saied ==
Tunisia's first democratically elected president, Beji Caid Essebsi, died in July 2019. After him, Kais Saied became Tunisia's president after a landslide victory in the 2019 Tunisian presidential election in October 2019. On 23 October 2019, Kais Saied was sworn in as Tunisian president.

On 25 July 2021 in light of violent demonstrations against the government demanding the improvement of basic services and amid a growing COVID-19 outbreak, Saied suspended parliament for thirty days and relieved the prime minister Hichem Mechichi from his duties, waiving the immunity of the parliament members and ordering the military to close the parliament house. Saied's actions, which included relieving the prime minister of his duties, assuming the executive authority, suspending the Parliament and closing the offices of some foreign news agencies, appeared to have been clear signs of a coup, as they disregard Article 80 of the Tunisian constitution which states that before raising an emergency state, the president must consult his prime minister and the head of the Parliament, and even then the Parliament cannot be suspended.

In September 2021, President Kaïs Saïed announced an upcoming reform of the 2014 Constitution and the formation of a new government led by Najla Bouden Romdhane, first woman prime minister of Tunisia and the Arab world. A constitutional referendum was scheduled for 25 July 2022. After the referendum results indicated that 90% of voters supported Saied, he emerged as victorious and promised that Tunisia will enter the new phase after he got the unlimited power. Critics said the new constitution has a risk of the return of authoritarian rule to the country.

On 6 October 2024, President Kais Saied won a second term with more than 90% of the vote in Tunisian presidential election. Five political parties had urged people to boycott the elections.

== See also ==
- Berber people
- Berber languages
- Phoenician languages
- Phoenicia
- Carthage
- History of the Jews in Tunisia
- North Africa during the Classical Period
- Umayyad conquest of North Africa
- Ifriqiya
- Aghlabid Dynasty
- Almohad
- Hafsid
- Barbary Coast
- List of Beys of Tunis
- French occupation of Tunisia
- History of French-era Tunisia
- Tunisian naturalization issue
- Thala-Kasserine Disturbances
- Timeline of Tunisia
- Tunisian Italians
- Tunisia
- History of modern Tunisia
- Tunis history and timeline (capital and largest city)
- History of Africa
- Tunisian Campaign
