= Hachani Cabinet =

Tunisian government (since 2023)

- Cabinet of Tunisia

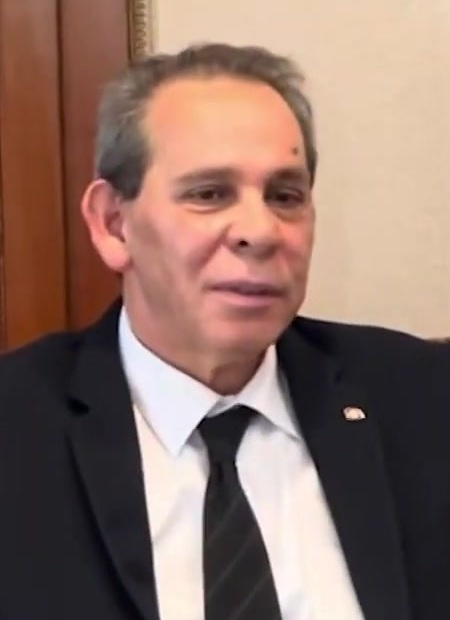
- Date formed: 1 August 2023
- Date dissolved: 25 August 2024

People and organisations
- Head of state: Kais Saied
- Head of government: Ahmed Hachani
- Total no. of members: 24 incl. Prime Minister
- Member parties: Independent politicians

History
- Election: –
- Predecessor: Bouden Cabinet (2021–23)
- Successor: Madouri Cabinet

The Hachani Cabinet was the government of Tunisia from 2023 til mid-late 2024. It was led by then Prime Minister Ahmed Hachani.

All ministers from the previous cabinet stayed in office when this government came into power.

== Cabinet members ==
Office	Name	Party
Prime Minister	Ahmed Hachani	Independent
Minister of Interior	Kamel Feki	Independent
Minister of Defence	Imed Memmich	Independent
Minister of Foreign Affairs, Migration and Tunisians Abroad	Nabil Ammar	Independent
Minister of Justice	Leïla Jaffel	Independent
Minister of Finance	Sihem Boughdiri	Independent
Minister of Economy and Planning	(Acting) Sihem Boughdiri	Independent
Minister of Industry, Energy and Mines	Vacant	Independent
Minister of Trade and Export Development	Kalthoum Ben Rejeb	Independent
Minister of Agriculture, Water Resources and Fisheries	Abdelmonem Belaâti	Independent
Minister of Social Affairs	Malek Ezzahi	Independent
Minister of Health	Ali Mrabet	Independent
Minister of Education	Mohamed Ali Boughdiri	FVP
Minister of Youth and Sports	Kamel Deguiche	Independent
Minister of Employment and Vocational Training, Government spokesperson	Vacant	Independent
Minister of Higher Education, Scientific Research	Moncef Boukthir	Independent
Minister of Transport	Rabie Majidi	Independent
Minister of Communication Technologies	Nizar Ben Néji	Independent
Minister of Equipment and Housing	Sarra Zaâfrani	Independent
Minister of State Domains and Land Affairs	Mohamed Rekik	Independent
Minister of Environment	Leila Chikhaoui	Independent
Minister of Tourism	Mohamed Moez Belhassine	Independent
Minister of Religious Affairs	Vacant	Independent
Minister of Women, Family, Children and Elderly	Amel Moussa	Independent
Minister of Culture	Hayet Guettat	Independent
Secretary of State for Foreign Affairs	Mounir Ben Rjiba	Independent
Secretary of State for Agriculture	Ridha Gabouj	Independent
Secretary of State for International Cooperation	Vacant	Independent

== Cabinet reshuffle ==
On 17 October 2023 the president of the republic Kais Saied dismissed Minister of Economy and Planning Samir Saied and appoints Sihem Boughdiri Minister of Finance, to run the Ministry of Economy and Planning on a temporary basis.

On 21 June 2024 President Kais Saied dismissed Minister of Religious Affairs Ibrahim Chaibi from his position after 49 Tunisian Hajj pilgrims were reported to have died in Saudi Arabia.
