= Madouri Cabinet =

- Cabinet of Tunisia
- Date formed: 25 August 2024
- Date dissolved: 20 March 2025

People and organisations
- Head of state: Kais Saied
- Head of government: Kamel Madouri
- Total no. of members: 25 incl. Prime Minister
- Member parties: Independent politicians

History
- Election: –
- Predecessor: Hachani Cabinet (2023–24)
- Successor: Zaafarani Cabinet (2025–)

The Madouri Cabinet was the government of Tunisia from 2024 to 2025. On 25 August 2024, the government was reshuffled with the arrival of 19 new ministers and three secretaries of state.

== Cabinet members ==
Office	Name	Party
Prime Minister	Kamel Madouri	Independent
Minister of Justice	Leïla Jaffel	Independent
Minister of Defence	Khaled Sehili	Independent
Minister of Interior	Khaled Nouri	Independent
Minister of Foreign Affairs, Migration and Tunisians Abroad	Mohamed Ali Nafti	Independent
Minister of Health	Mustapha Ferjani	Military
Minister of Finance	Sihem Boughdiri	Independent
Minister of Equipment and Housing	Sarra Zaâfrani	Independent
Minister of Economy and Planning	Samir Abdelhafidh	Independent
Minister of Industry, Energy and Mines	Fatma Thabet	Independent
Minister of Social Affairs	Issam Lahmar	Independent
Minister of Trade and Export Development	Samir Abid	Independent
Minister of Agriculture, Water Resources and Fisheries	Ezzeddine Ben Cheikh	Independent
Minister of Education	Noureddine Nouri	Independent
Minister of Higher Education, Scientific Research	Mondher Belaid	Independent
Minister of Employment and Vocational Training, Government spokesperson	Riadh Chaouad	Independent
Minister of Youth and Sports	Sadok Mourali	Independent
Minister of Transport	Rachid Amri	Independent
Minister of Communication Technologies	Sofiène Hemissi	Independent
Minister of State Domains and Land Affairs	Wajdi Hdhili	Independent
Minister of Environment	Habib Abid	Independent
Minister of Tourism	Soufiane Tekaya	Independent
Minister of Religious Affairs	Ahmed Bouhali	Independent
Minister of Women, Family, Children and Elderly	Asma Jebri	Independent
Minister of Culture	Amina Srarfi	Independent
Secretary of State for National Security	Sofien Bessadok	Independent
Secretary of State	Mohamed Ben Ayed	Independent
Secretary of State for Water	Hamadi Habib	Independent
Secretary of State for Energy Transition	Wael Chouchène	Independent
Secretary of State for Community Enterprises	Hasna Jiballah	Independent
