= Zaafarani Cabinet =

Tunisian government cabinet headed by Sara Zaafarani

- Cabinet of Tunisia

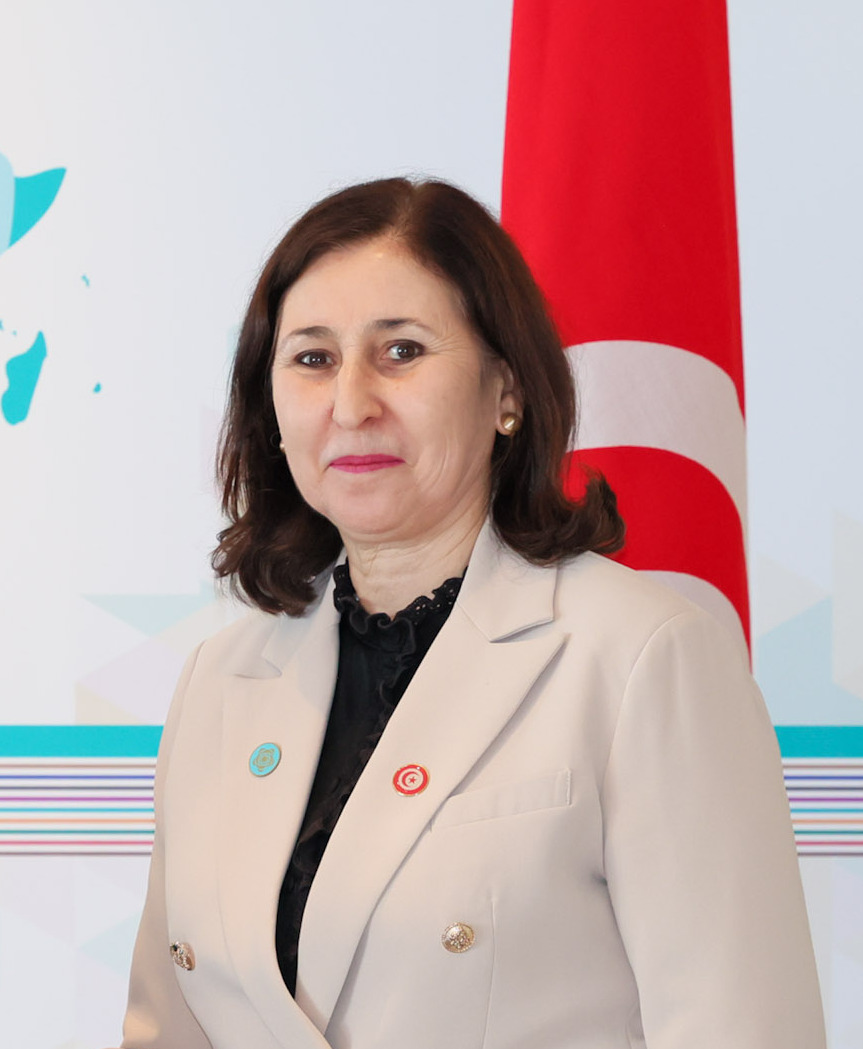
- Date formed: 20 March 2025

People and organisations
- Head of state: Kais Saied
- Head of government: Sara Zaafarani
- Total no. of members: 25 incl. Prime Minister
- Member parties: Independent politicians

History
- Election: –
- Predecessor: Madouri Cabinet (2024–25)

The Zaafrani Cabinet is a Tunisian government headed by Sara Zaafarani, who succeeded Kamel Maddouri's government after its prime minister resigned on the night between 20 March and 21 March 2025. It is the sixth government under President Kais Saied and the fourth government under the 2022 Tunisian Constitution. It is the second government in Tunisia and the Arab world to be headed by a woman.

== First composition (March 20, 2025) ==
The replacement of Tunisian Prime Minister Kamel Madouri did not coincide with a major reshuffle in the government, with the exception of the appointment of Slah Zouari as Minister of Equipment and Housing, succeeding Sara Zaafarani, who was appointed Prime Minister. Since 20 March 2025, Sara Zaafarani, the Prime Minister, has been serving alongside members of Kamel Madouri's government.

== Ministers ==
| Party | Office | Name |
|---|---|---|
| Independent | Prime Minister | Sara Zaafarani |
| Independent | Minister of Justice | Leïla Jaffel |
| Independent | Minister of Defence | Khaled Shili |
| Independent | Minister of Interior | Khaled Nouri |
| Independent | Minister of Foreign Affairs, Migration and Tunisians Abroad | Mohamed Ali Nafti |
| Military | Minister of Health | Mustapha Ferjani |
| Independent | Minister of Finance | Mechket Slama |
| Independent | Minister of Equipment and Housing | Slah Zouari |
| Independent | Minister of Economy and Planning | Samir Abdelhafidh |
| Independent | Minister of Industry, Energy and Mines | Fatma Thabet |
| Independent | Minister of Social Affairs | Issam Lahmar |
| Independent | Minister of Trade and Export Development | Samir Abid |
| Independent | Minister of Agriculture, Fisheries and Water Resources | Ezzeddine Ben Cheikh |
| Independent | Minister of Education | Noureddine Nouri |
| Independent | Minister of Higher Education and Scientific Research | Mondher Belaid |
| Independent | Minister of Employment and Vocational Training | Riadh Chaouad |
| Independent | Minister of Youth and Sports | Sadok Mourali |
| Independent | Minister of Communication Technologies | Sofiène Hemissi |
| Independent | Minister of Transport | Rachid Amri |
| Independent | Minister of State Domains and Land Affairs | Wajdi Hdhili |
| Independent | Minister of Environment | Habib Abid |
| Independent | Minister of Tourism and Traditional Industries | Soufiane Tekaya |
| Independent | Minister of Religious Affairs | Ahmed Bouhali |
| Independent | Minister of Family, Women, Children and the Elderly | Asma Jebri |
| Independent | Minister of Culture | Amina Sarrafi |

== Secretaries of State ==
| Party | Ministerial portfolio | Name |
|---|---|---|
| Independent | Secretary of State to the Minister of the Interior in charge of National Security | Sofien Bessadok |
| Independent | Secretary of State to the Minister of Foreign Affairs, Migration and Tunisians Abroad | Mohamed Ben Ayed |
| Independent | Secretary of State to the Minister of Industry, Mines and Energy in charge of energy transition | Wael Chouchène |
| Independent | Secretary of State, Minister of Agriculture, Maritime Fisheries and Water Resources, in charge of Water | Hamadi Habaieb |
| Independent | Secretary of State to the Minister of Employment and Vocational Training in charge of private companies | Hasna Jiballah |
