= Bouden Cabinet =

Tunisian government (2021 to 2023)

- Cabinet of Tunisia

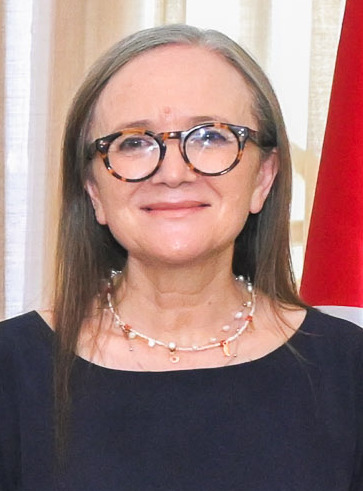
- Date formed: 11 October 2021
- Date dissolved: 2 August 2023

People and organisations
- Head of state: Kais Saied
- Head of government: Najla Bouden
- Total no. of members: 25 incl. Prime Minister
- Member parties: Independent politicians

History
- Election: –
- Predecessor: Mechichi Cabinet (2020–21)
- Successor: Hachani Cabinet

The Bouden Cabinet was the government of Tunisia from 2021 to 2023. It is headed by Najla Bouden, the first female prime minister in Tunisia and the Arab world. The formation was result of ongoing political instability and an economic crisis as a result of the COVID-19 pandemic in Tunisia.

== Cabinet members ==
The Bouden government consists of the Prime Minister, 24 ministers and 1 secretary of state.

Office	Name	Party
Prime Minister	Najla Bouden	Independent
Minister of Interior	Taoufik Charfeddine	Independent
Minister of Defence	Imed Memmich	Independent
Minister of Foreign Affairs, Migration and Tunisians Abroad	Othman Jerandi	Independent
Minister of Justice	Leïla Jaffel	Independent
Minister of Finance	Sihem Boughdiri	Independent
Minister of Economy and Planning	Samir Saïed	Independent
Minister of Industry, Energy and Mines	Neila Gonji	Independent
Minister of Trade and Export Development	Fadhila Rebhi	Independent
Minister of Agriculture, Water Resources and Fisheries	Mahmoud Elyes Hamza	Independent
Minister of Social Affairs	Malek Ezzahi	Independent
Minister of Health	Ali Mrabet	Independent
Minister of Education	Fethi Sellaouti	Independent
Minister of Youth and Sports	Kamel Deguiche	Independent
Minister of Employment and Vocational Training, Government spokesperson	Nasreddine Nsibi	Independent
Minister of Higher Education, Scientific Research	Moncef Boukthir	Independent
Minister of Transport	Rabie Majidi	Independent
Minister of Communication Technologies	Nizar Ben Néji	Independent
Minister of Equipment and Housing	Sarra Zaâfrani	Independent
Minister of State Domains and Land Affairs	Mohamed Rekik	Independent
Minister of Environment	Leila Chikhaoui	Independent
Minister of Tourism	Mohamed Moez Belhassine	Independent
Minister of Religious Affairs	Ibrahim Chaibi	Independent
Minister of Women, Family, Children and Elderly	Amel Moussa	Independent
Minister of Culture	Hayet Guettat	Independent
Secretary of State for International Cooperation	Aïda Hamdi	Independent

== Cabinet reshuffle ==
2On 8 March 2022 the Secretary of State for International Cooperation Aïda Hamdi resigned.

On 6 January 2023 President Kaïs Saïed announced the dismissal of Fadhila Rebhi, Minister of Trade and Export Development, replaced by Kalthoum Ben Rejeb six days later.

On 30 January 2023 Ministers Fethi Sellaouti (Education) and Mahmoud Elyes Hamza (Agriculture, Water Resources and Fisheries) were dismissed and replaced by Mohamed Ali Boughdiri and Abdelmonem Belaâti.

On 7 February 2023 Minister Othman Jerandi (Foreign Affairs) was sacked and replaced by Nabil Ammar.

On 13 February 2023 Ridha Gabouj was appointed Secretary of State in charge of Waters to the Minister of Agriculture, Hydraulic Resources and Fisheries.

On 22 February 2023 the President of the Republic dismissed Nasreddine Nsibi, Minister of Vocational Training and Employment and government spokesman and appoints Mounir Ben Rjiba as Secretary of State to the Minister of Foreign Affairs.

On 17 March 2023 Interior Minister Taoufik Charfeddine announced his resignation for family reasons he is replaced the same day by Kamel Feki.

On 4 May 2023 Minister of Industry, Energy and Mines Neila Gonji is dismissed from office by presidential decree without naming a successor.

Office	Name	Party
Prime Minister	Najla Bouden	Independent
Minister of Interior	Kamel Feki	Independent
Minister of Defence	Imed Memmich	Independent
Minister of Foreign Affairs, Migration and Tunisians Abroad	Nabil Ammar	Independent
Minister of Justice	Leïla Jaffel	Independent
Minister of Finance	Sihem Boughdiri	Independent
Minister of Economy and Planning	Samir Saïed	Independent
Minister of Trade and Export Development	Kalthoum Ben Rejeb	Independent
Minister of Agriculture, Water Resources and Fisheries	Abdelmonem Belaâti	Independent
Minister of Social Affairs	Malek Ezzahi	Independent
Minister of Health	Ali Mrabet	Independent
Minister of Education	Mohamed Ali Boughdiri	FVP
Minister of Youth and Sports	Kamel Deguiche	Independent
Minister of Higher Education, Scientific Research	Moncef Boukthir	Independent
Minister of Transport	Rabie Majidi	Independent
Minister of Communication Technologies	Nizar Ben Néji	Independent
Minister of Equipment and Housing	Sarra Zaâfrani	Independent
Minister of State Domains and Land Affairs	Mohamed Rekik	Independent
Minister of Environment	Leila Chikhaoui	Independent
Minister of Tourism	Mohamed Moez Belhassine	Independent
Minister of Religious Affairs	Ibrahim Chaibi	Independent
Minister of Women, Family, Children and Elderly	Amel Moussa	Independent
Minister of Culture	Hayet Guettat	Independent
Secretary of State for Foreign Affairs	Mounir Ben Rjiba	Independent
Secretary of State for Agriculture	Ridha Gabouj	Independent
