= Mechichi Cabinet =

- Cabinet of Tunisia
- Date formed: 2 September 2020
- Date dissolved: 25 July 2021 (10 months and 23 days)

People and organisations
- Head of state: Kais Saied
- Head of government: Hichem Mechichi
- Total no. of members: 29 (incl. Prime Minister)
- Member parties: Independent politicians External support: Ennahda, Heart of Tunisia, Tahya Tounes, Machrouu Tounes, Tunisian Alternative, Afek Tounes, independent members of parliament, Farmers' Voice Party
- Status in legislature: Unity government
- Opposition parties: Democratic Current, Free Destourian Party, People’s Movement, Popular Front, Democratic and Social Union (VDS-PR-MDS)

History
- Election: 2019 Tunisian parliamentary election
- Legislature term: II legislature (2019-2021)
- Predecessor: Fakhfakh Cabinet (2020)
- Successor: Bouden Cabinet

The Mechichi Cabinet was the 31st government of the Tunisian Republic. It was formed by Hichem Mechichi on the appointment of President Kais Saied. The government was formed in 2020 and fell in 2021.

== Cabinet members ==
Office	Name	Party
Head of Government	Hichem Mechichi	Independent
Minister of Interior	Taoufik Charfeddine	Independent
Minister of Defence	Brahim Bartagi	Independent
Minister of Foreign Affairs, Migration and Tunisians Abroad	Othman Jerandi	Independent
Minister of Justice	Mohamed Bousseta	Independent
Minister of Economy, Finance and Investment Support	Ali Kooli	Independent
Minister of Industry, Energy and Mines	Salwa Sghayer	Independent
Minister for Commerce and Export Development	Mohamed Bousaïd	Independent
Minister of Transport and Logistics	Moez Chakchouk	Independent
Minister of Tourism	Habib Ammar	Independent
Minister of Agriculture, Water Resources and Fisheries	Akissa Bahri	Independent
Minister of Health	Faouzi Mehdi	Independent
Minister of Social Affairs	Mohamed Trabelsi	Independent
Minister of Education	Fethi Sellaouti	Independent
Minister of Higher Education and Scientific Research	Olfa Benouda	Independent
Minister of Communication Technologies	Mohamed Fadhel Kraiem	Independent
Minister of Culture	Walid Zidi	Independent
Minister of Youth, Sports and Professional Integration	Kamel Deguiche	Independent
Minister of Women, Family, Children and Elderly	Imen Houimel	Independent
Minister of Religious Affairs	Ahmed Adhoum	Independent
Minister of Environment and Local Affairs	Mustapha Aroui	Independent
Minister of Equipment, Housing and Infrastructure	Kamel Doukh	Independent
Minister of State Domains and Land Affairs	Leïla Jaffel	Independent
Minister in charge of Relations with Parliament	Ali Hafsi Jeddi	Independent
Minister in charge of Civil Service	Hasna Ben Slimane	Independent
Minister in charge of Relations with constitutional bodies and Civil Society	Thouraya Jeribi Khémiri	Independent
Secretary of State for Foreign Affairs, Migration and Tunisians Abroad	Mohamed Ali Nafti	Independent
Secretary of State for Public Finances and Taxation	Khalil Chtourou	Independent
Secretary of State for Youth, Sports and Professional Integration	Sihem Ayadi	Independent
