= Fatma Thabet =

Tunisian politician (born 1961)

- فاطمة ثابت
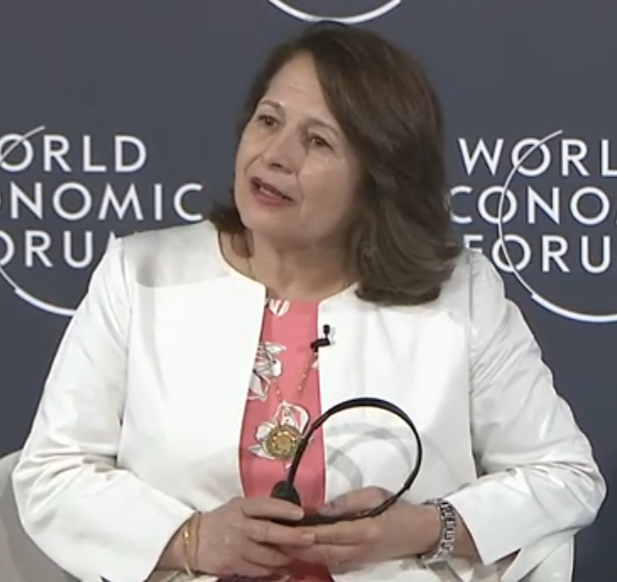
- Thabet in 2024

Minister of Industry, Energy and Mines
- In office 24 January 2024 – 27 April 2026
- Preceded by: Neila Gonji
- Succeeded by: Slah Zouari

Personal details
- Born: 20 August 1961 (age 64)
- Party: Independent

Fatma Thabet Chiboub (born 20 August 1961) is a Tunisian politician.

== Biography ==
Fatma Thabet has worked in the Ministry of Industry and the Ministry of Finance including notably as Chief Inspector of Economic Affairs. She was also Director General of the Bizerte Economic Activities Space, Director General of the Industry Rehabilitation Bureau at the Ministry of Industry and Small Businesses and, from 2021, Director, representing the State on the Board of Directors of the Bank of Tunisia and the Emirates.

On 24 January 2024, she was appointed Minister of Industry, Energy and Mines in the government of Ahmed Hachani.

On 27 April 2026, she was dismissed as minister by President Kaïs Saïed, and replaced on an interim basis by the Minister of Equipment and Housing, Slah Zouari.

== See also ==
- Hachani Cabinet
- Madouri Cabinet
- Zaafarani Cabinet
