= Mechket Slama =

Tunisian magistrate and politician

Minister of Finance
- Incumbent
- Assumed office 5 February 2025
- President: Kais Saied
- Prime Minister: Kamel Madouri; Sarra Zaafrani
- Preceded by: Sihem Boughdiri

Personal details
- Party: Independent

Mechket Slama Khaldi is a Tunisian magistrate and politician. She has been Minister of Finance since February 2025.

== Biography ==
Prior to her ministerial appointment, Mechket Slama was a magistrate of the judicial order of the third grade and headed the National Criminal Reconciliation Commission. She was also a member of the Competition Council, which reports to the Ministry of Trade and Export Development.

On 5 February 2025, she was appointed Minister of Finance, succeeding Sihem Boughdiri.

== See also ==
- Ministry of Finance (Tunisia)
