= Hachani =

Hachani is a surname. Notable people with the surname include:

- Abdelkader Hachani (1956–1999), Algerian politician
- Ahmed Hachani (born 1956), Tunisian politician
  - Hachani Cabinet
