= Abderrahim Zouari =

Tunisian politician

- عبد الرحيم الزواري

Minister of Transport
- In office 2004–2011
- President: Zine El Abidine Ben Ali

Minister of Tourism
- In office 2002–2004
- President: Zine El Abidine Ben Ali

Minister of Sports
- In office 2000–2002
- President: Zine El Abidine Ben Ali

Secretary-General of Constitutional Democratic Rally
- In office 1999–2000
- President: Zine El Abidine Ben Ali

Minister of Education
- In office 1998–1999
- President: Zine El Abidine Ben Ali

Minister of Foreign Affairs
- In office 1997–1997
- President: Zine El Abidine Ben Ali

Ministry of Youth and Childhood
- In office 1993–1997
- President: Zine El Abidine Ben Ali

Ambassador of Tunisia to Maroc
- In office 1992–1993
- President: Zine El Abidine Ben Ali
- Preceded by: Mohamed Ghannouchi
- Succeeded by: Hamadi Jebali

Minister of Justice
- In office 1991–1992
- President: Zine El Abidine Ben Ali

Secretary-General of Constitutional Democratic Rally
- In office 31 July 1988 – 20 February 1991
- President: Zine El Abidine Ben Ali

Personal details
- Born: 18 April 1944 (age 82) Dahmani, Tunisia
- Party: Destourian Movement
- Other political affiliations: Constitutional Democratic Rally (–2011)

Abderrahim Zouari (Tunisian Arabic: عبد الرحيم الزواري; born 18 April 1944) is a Tunisian politician. He was the Minister of Transport from 2004 to 2011 under President Zine El Abidine Ben Ali. He was the candidate for the Destourian Movement in the 2014 presidential election. In January 2019, Zouari formed a party named Tahya Tounes.

== Biography ==
From 1974 to 1978, he served as Governor of Gabès, then Governor of Nabeul. In 1991, he was appointed as Minister of Justice. From 1992 to 1993, he served as the Tunisian ambassador to Morocco. He was appointed as Foreign Minister in 1997, then as Education Minister in 1999. He also served as Secretary-General of the Constitutional Democratic Rally. In 2001, he was appointed as Minister of Youth and Sports, as well as Tourism and Handicrafts. In 2004, he was appointed as Minister of Transport, remaining in that post until he was dismissed in the aftermath of the Tunisian Revolution.
