= Mohamed Charfi =

Tunisian academic, politician (1936–2008)

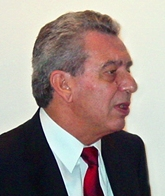

Minister of Higher Education and Scientific Research
- In office 11 April 1989 – 1 June 1994
- President: Zine El Abidine Ben Ali
- Prime Minister: Hédi Baccouche; Hamed Karoui
- Preceded by: Abdessalem Mseddi
- Succeeded by: Ahmed Friaâ

Personal details
- Born: 11 October 1936 (age 90) Sfax, Tunisia
- Occupation: Jurist, Professor (Tunis University), Writer

Mohamed Charfi (11 October 1936 – 6 June 2008) was a Tunisian academic and politician who served as Minister of Education of Tunisia from 1989 to 1994.

== Early life ==
Charfi was born in Sfax, Tunisia, on October 11, 1936.

He studied at the Paris Law Faculty. He was an active member of the Tunisia General Student Union (Union générale des étudiants tunisiens) in Paris in the 1960s and cofounded the leftist group Perspectives. He was jailed as a result of his leftist activities.

== Career ==
Charfi co-founded the Tunisian Human Rights League in 1976.

He served as Minister of Education under the presidency of Zine El Abidine Ben Ali. One of his first acts as minister was to set up Zaitouna University in 1989 as a religious coeducational institution, and he personally oversaw the university curricular design, which he intended to incorporate "universal values of Islam" and religious tolerance. Among other educational policies enacted during his tenure was the expansion of teacher training programs, compulsory education, the reduction of Islamic influence in public education, and the elimination of vocational tracks from secondary school.

== Personal life ==
He was married to Faouzia Charfi.
