= Hachemi Jegham =

Tunisian lawyer (born 1937)

Hashemi Jegham
- الهاشمي جغام
- Born: Mohammed Al-Hashemi Jegham; 1 November 1937; Sousse
- Died: 25 November 2019 (aged 82); Sousse
- Occupations: Writer and novelist

Hashemi Jegham (Arabic: الهاشمي جغام, romanized: al-Hāshimī Jaghām; 1 November 1937 – 25 November 2019) was a Tunisian lawyer and human rights activist.

== Biography ==
He finished his primary and secondary schools in Sousse. In 1957 and graduated from Sadiki College. Hashemi obtained a bachelor's degree in 1961 and further a law degree in Tunis and also in Paris. He finished the Graduate School of Public Law in 1974 and was called to the bar the same year.

Very active from an early age, he presided over the Jeunesse scolaire from 1955 to 1956 and seated as a member of the Administrative Commission of the Tunisian General Labour Union in 1955. He was also editor-in-chief of the newspaper L'Étudiant tunisien between 1957 and 1959.

During his years of studies in Paris, he founded in 1963, with Ahmed Smaoui, Mohamed Charfi Mohamed Mahfoud, Khemais Chammari, Hassen Ouardani, Abdelhamid Mezghenni and Noureddine Ben Kheder, Socialist Study and Action Group in Tunisia. This group publishes a journal titled Perspectives, then Perspectives tunisiennes.

With Noureddine Ben Kheder and Mahmoud Ben Romdhane, he was a founding member of the Arab Center for the independence of the judiciary (Cairo) in 1990 and vice-president of the Tunisian Center for the Independence of Justice and Lawyers. He has chaired the Higher Committee on Human Rights since 2011.

== Private life ==
Hachemi Jegham is married and has two children.
