= Abdessalem Mseddi =

Tunisian academic, writer, diplomat and politician

Minister of Higher Education and Scientific Research
- In office 12 April 1988 – 11 April 1989
- President: Zine El Abidine Ben Ali
- Prime Minister: Hédi Baccouche
- Preceded by: Tijani Chelli
- Succeeded by: Mohamed Charfi

Personal details
- Born: 26 January 1945 (age 81) Sfax, Tunisia
- Occupation: Linguist, Professor (Tunis University), Writer

Abdessalem Mseddi (Arabic: عبد السلام المسدي) is a Tunisian linguist, diplomat, writer, literary critic, and ex-minister, born 26 January 1945.

Mseddi was Minister of Higher Education from 1988 to 1989. He was subsequently appointed ambassador first to the Arab League (1989-1990), then to Saudi Arabia (1990-1991), after which he resumed teaching at Tunis University. Other positions he has held include General Secretary of the Tunisian Writers' Union and Secretary of the Scientific Council of the Doha Historical Dictionary of Arabic.

He is the author of a number of works, including Arab Identity and Language Security (2014).
