= Neila Gonji =

Tunisian politician (born 1959)

Minister of Industry, Energy and Mines
- In office 11 October 2021 – 4 May 2023
- Preceded by: Mohamed Bousaïd
- Succeeded by: Fatma Thabet

Personal details
- Born: 18 September 1959 (age 65)
- Political party: Independent

Neila Gonji (born 18 September 1959) is a Tunisian politician. She was Minister of Industry, Energy and Mines in the Bouden Government from 2021 till 2023.
