= Ministry of Economy and Planning =

Ministry of Economy and Planning may refer to:

- Ministry of Economy and Planning (Saudi Arabia)
- Ministry of Economy and Planning (Tunisia)
