= Sihem Boughdiri =

Tunisian banker and politician (born 1964/1965)

Minister of Economy and Finance
- In office 11 October 2021 – 5 February 2025
- President: Kais Saied
- Prime Minister: Najla Bouden; Ahmed Hachani; Kamel Madouri
- Succeeded by: Mechket Slama

Personal details
- Born: 1964 or 1965 (age 61–62) Tunisia
- Party: Independent

Sihem Boughdiri Nemsia (Arabic: سهام بوغديري نمصية; born 1964 or 1965) is a Tunisian banker and politician. She was Minister of Finance in the Bouden Cabinet from October 2021 to 5 February 2025 when she was dismissed by President Kais Saied amid a severe financial crisis in the country.

On 17 October 2023 Kaïs Saïed asked Sihem Boughdiri to assume the portfolio of interim Minister of Economy and Planning following the dismissal of Samir Saïed from this position.

She refused to cover her head when she took the oath of office, breaking with tradition.
