= List of tallest structures in Tunisia =

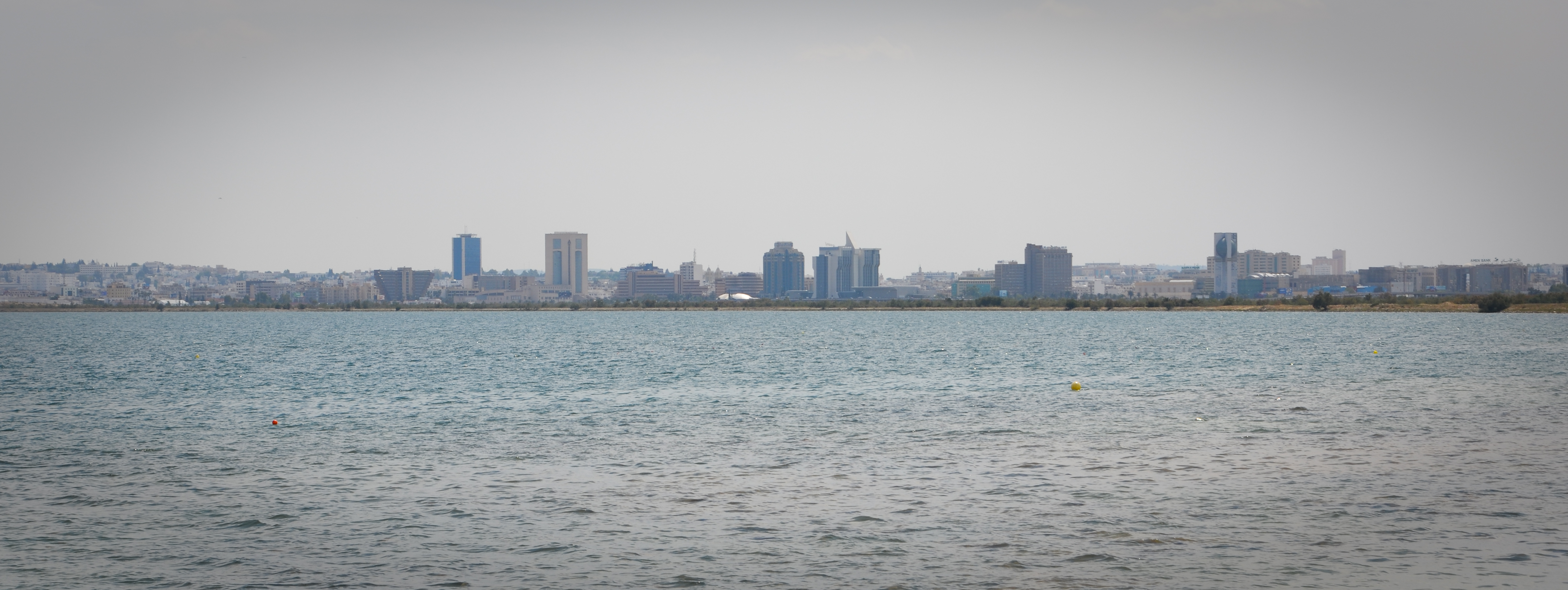
Tunis skyline from the lake.

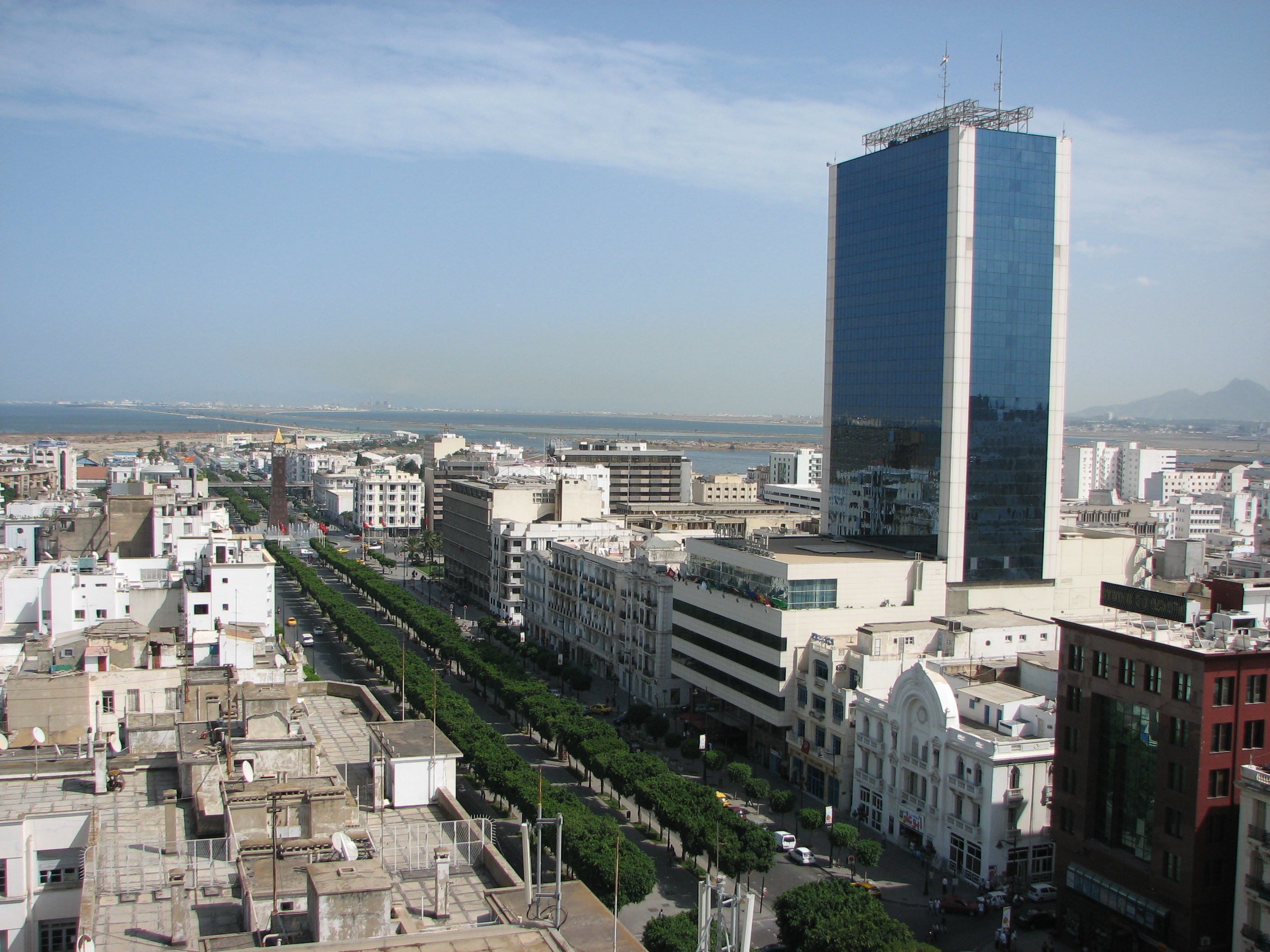
Africa Hotel, 102m

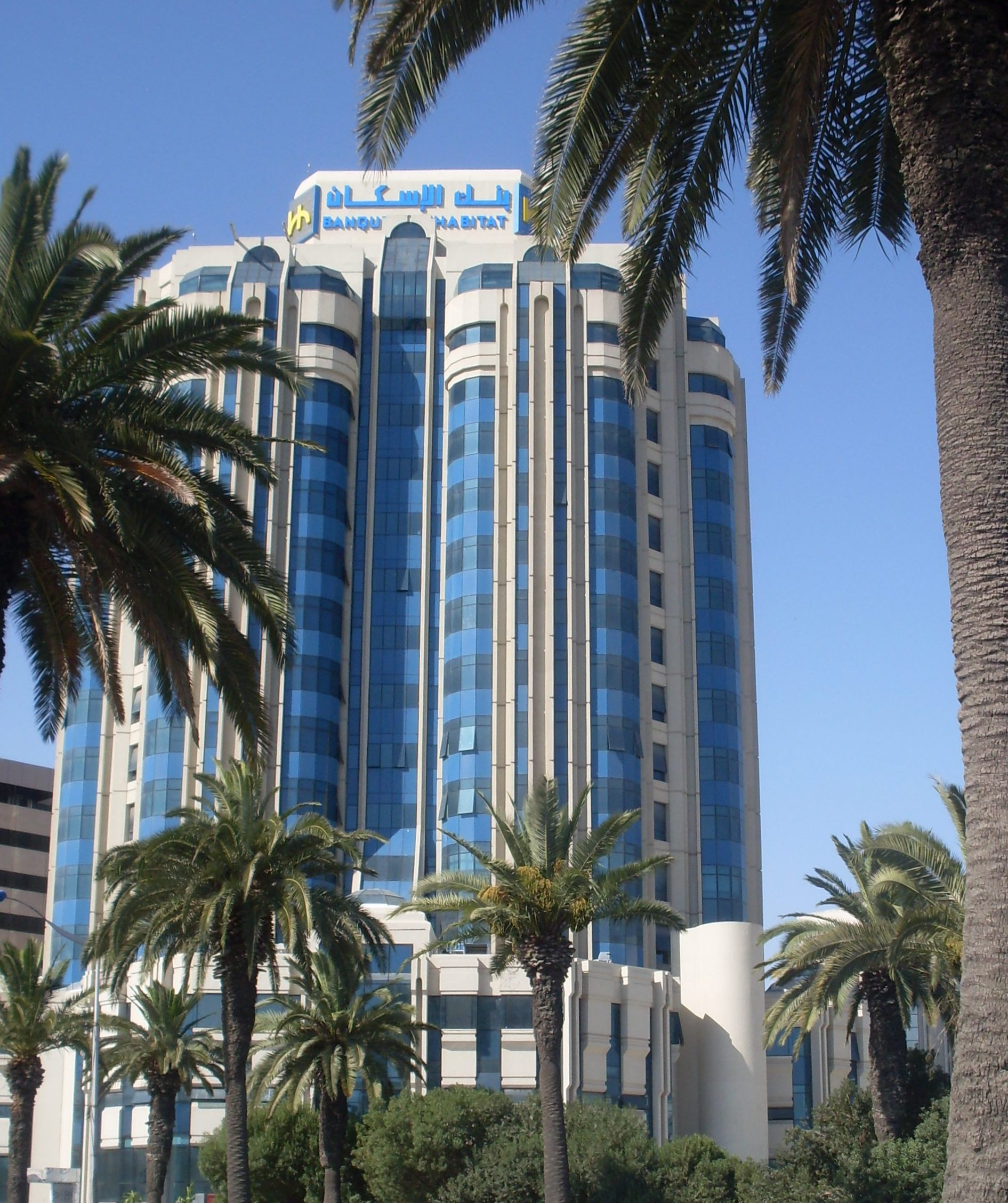
BH Bank Headquarters, 70m

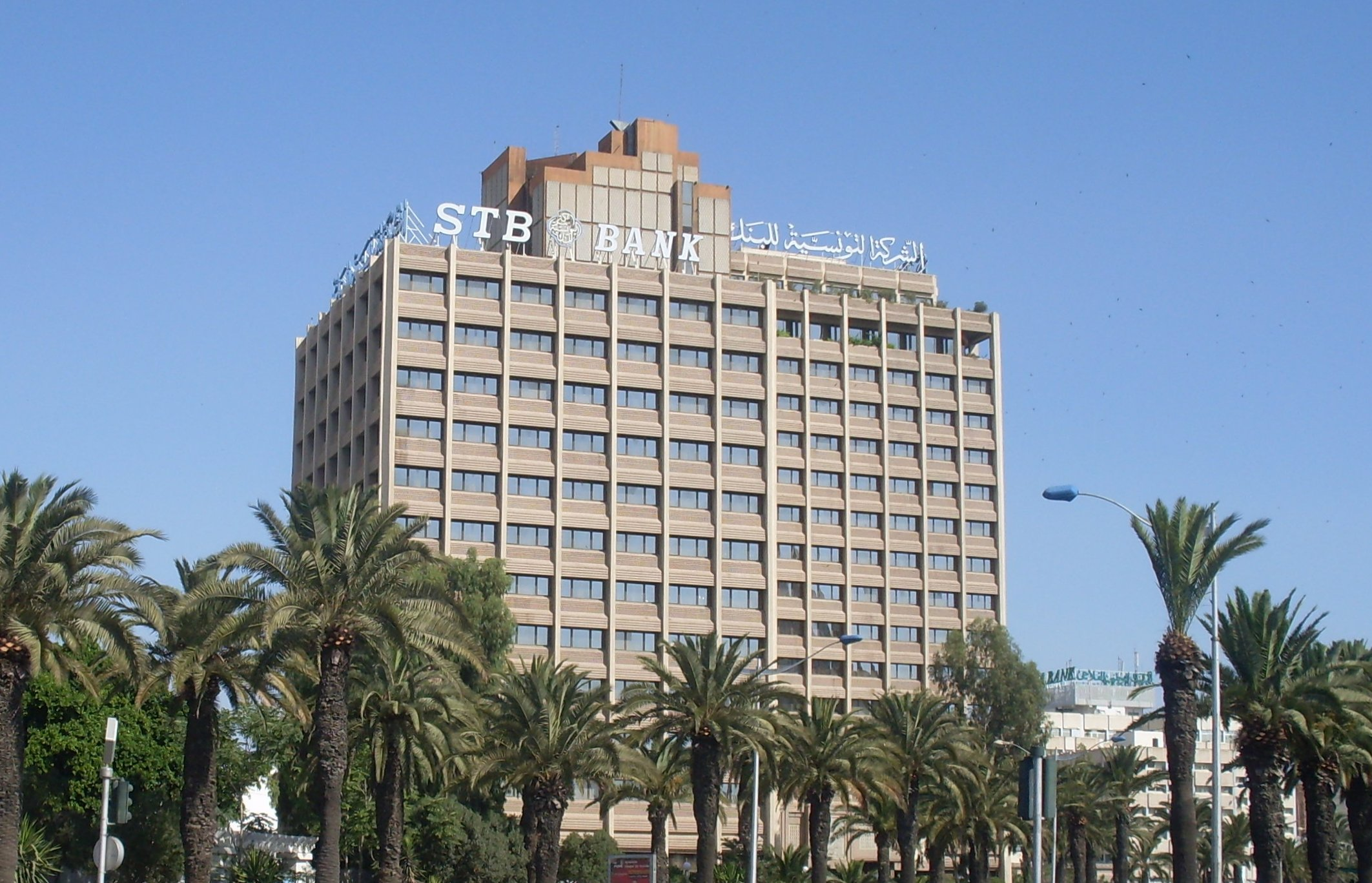
STB Bank, 65m

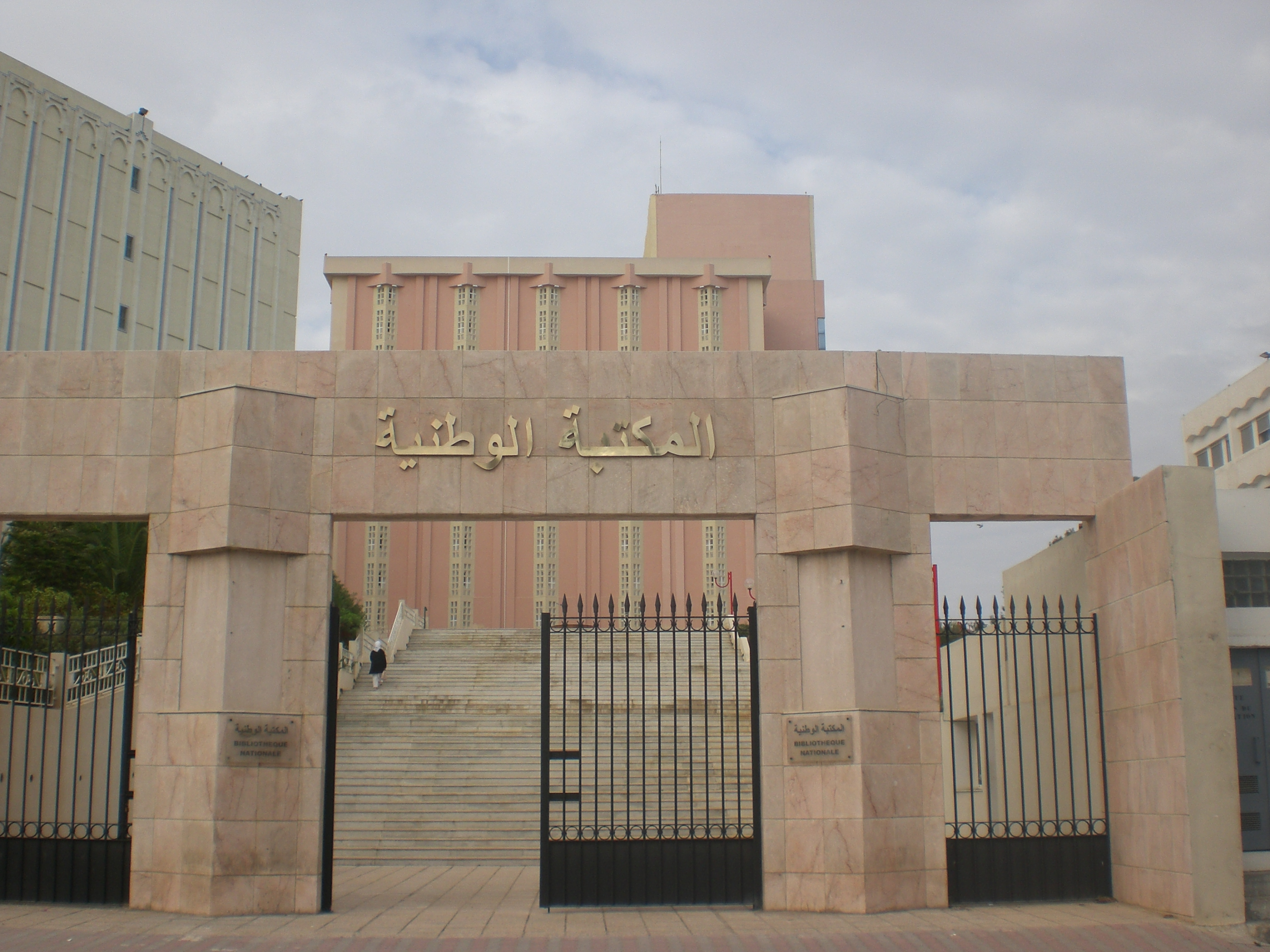
National Library of Tunisia, 46m

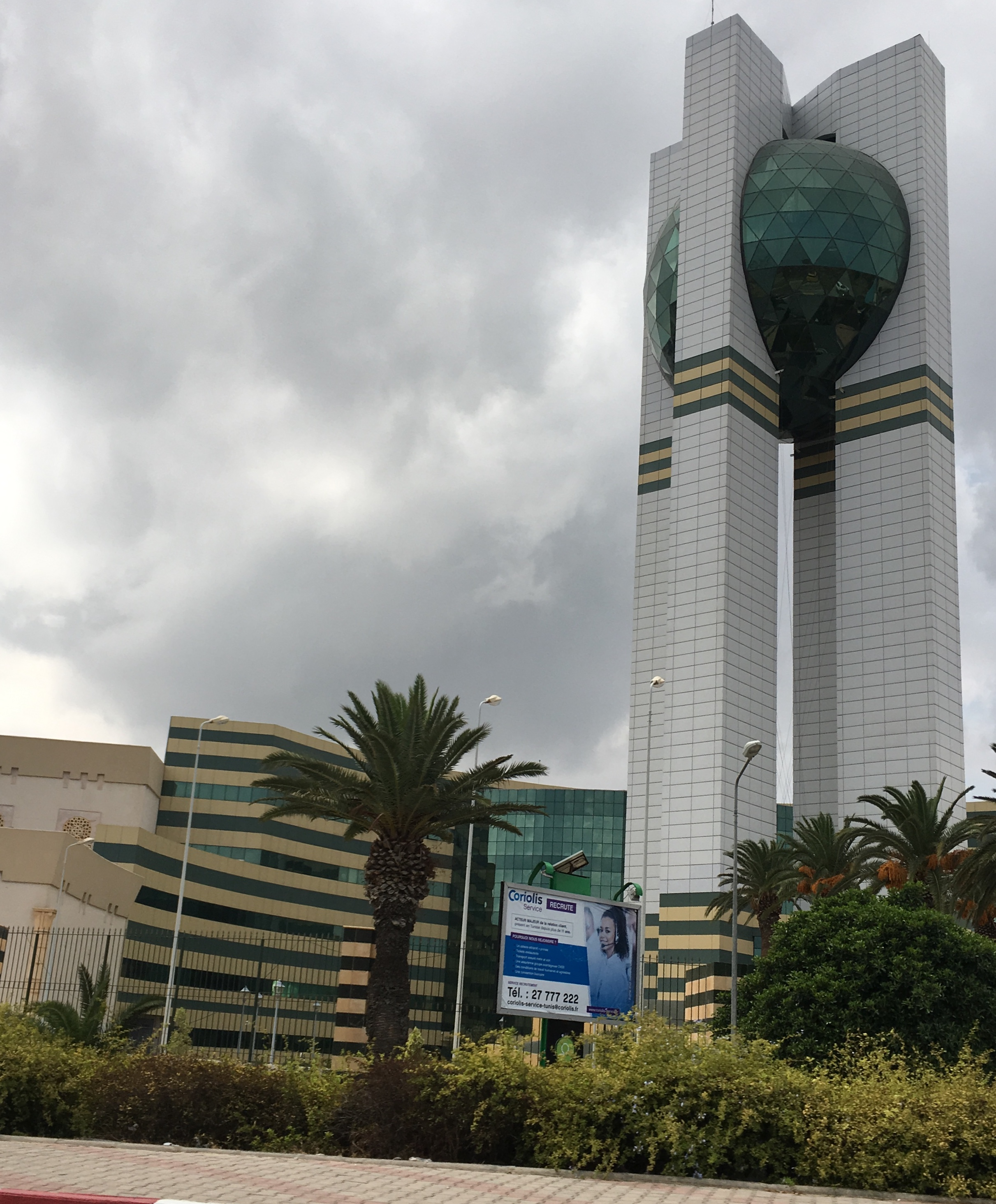
Tunis Culture City, 70m

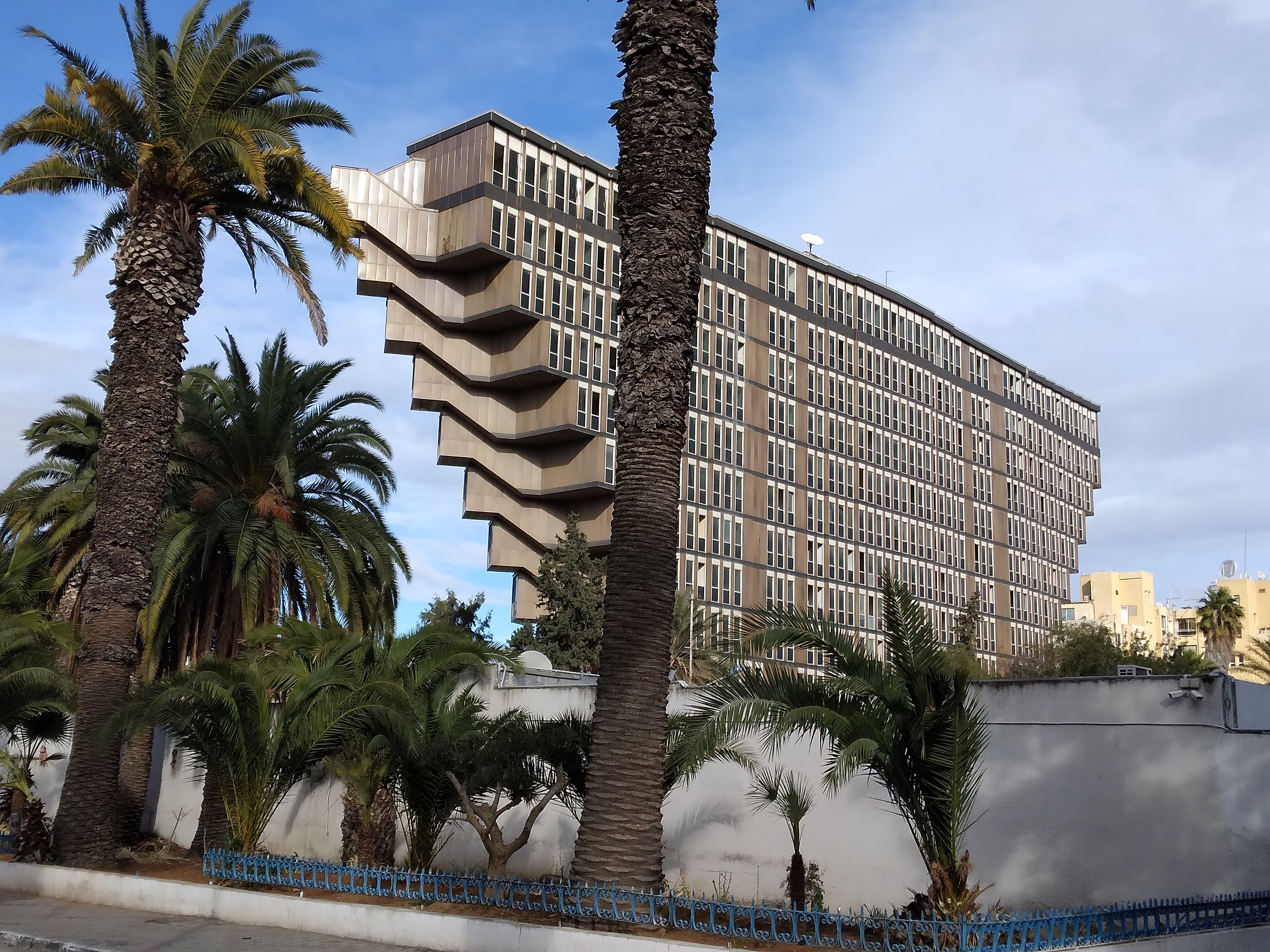
Grand Hôtel du Lac, 40m

This is a list of the tallest buildings and structures in Tunisia. It covers completed high-rise buildings, proposed and under-construction towers, notable religious structures, lighthouses, and tall non-residential structures such as telecommunications masts and industrial chimneys located across Tunisian cities including Tunis, Sfax, Sousse, and Bizerte.

== Buildings ==
Tallest Buildings in Tunisia
name of building	height	floors	date of construction	city	use
Hôtel Africa	102m	24	1971	Tunis	Hotel
Tour De La Nation	80m	23	2004	Tunis	Government building
Radisson Blu Hotel & Convention Center	75m	21	1988	Tunis	Hotel
Banque De L'habitat	70m	16	2010	Tunis	Offices
Tunis Culture City	70m	5	2018	Tunis	Tower
STB bank	63m	18	1987	Tunis	Offices
Military Hospital	60m	11	2000	Tunis	Hospital
Diplomat hotel	60m	17	1984	Tunis	Hotel
Iheb Center	58m	16	2018	Sfax	Mixed-use
Residence Sfax Towers	46m	11	2010	Sfax	Residential
Nasria Building	46m	11	2015	Sfax	Mixed-use
Elain Center	45m	12	2010	Sfax	Offices
La Couronne	44m	11	2016	Sfax	Mixed-use
Building on Ave 5 Aout	44m	12	2012	Sfax	Mixed-use
El Medina Center	43m	12	2007	Sfax	Offices
OTLA Bizerte	43m	14	1959	Bizerte	Residential
City Center Sfax	41m	11	2014	Sfax	Offices
Ibn Zohr	40m	10	2005	Sfax	Offices
Jibti Center	40m	10	2006	Sfax	Offices
Sousse Palace Hotel	40m	13	2026	Sousse	Hotel
ADB Old HQ	54m	15	2000	Tunis	Offices
El Hana International Hotel	51m	13	1984	Tunis	Hotel
API	51m	13	1989	Tunis	Offices
Ibn Khaldoun Hotel	51m	15	1990	Tunis	Hotel
Marriott Hotel	51m	14	2021	Tunis	Hotel
National Library of Tunisia	50m	15	2007	Tunis	Library
The Pyramids Residences	50m	14	2002	Tunis	Residential
Building on Rue Kamel Ataturk	50m	14	1979	Tunis	Mixed-use
Bouzaabia Al Rayhane Tower Residences	50m	15	2009	Souse	Residential
Transcom Center	48m	12	2017	Tunis	Offices
Golden Towers 1	48m	12	2016	Tunis	Offices
Golden Towers 2	48m	12	2016	Tunis	Offices
CUN Tower	48m	12	2015	Tunis	Offices
Verre Residences	47m			Tunis	Mixed-use
Lazreg Tower	47m	14	2018	Sousse	Residential
Radisson BLU IQ Business Center Lake Building	47m		2023	Tunis	hotel commerce
EY Towers	46.5m	12	2021	Tunis	Offices
Helya Tower 1	46.4m	12	2003	Sousse	Residential
Helya Tower 2	46.4m		2020	Sahloul	Residential
Marama Residences	46.4m,		2020	Sahloul	Residential
Coral Medical Towers	46.4m	12	2020	Tunis	Offices
Business Towers	46.3m	12	2022	Tunis	Offices
National Archives Building	46m	12	1990	Tunis	Offices
Zitouna Bank HQ	43m	8	2003	Tunis	Offices
Riadh Palms Hotel	43m	12	1990	Sousse	Hotel
OCT	43m	12	1962	Tunis	Offices
Yasmine Tower	43m	11	2015	Tunis	Mixed-use
Attijari Bank	40m	9	2014	Tunis	Offices
Grand Hotel Du Lac	40m	11	1973	Tunis	Hotel
hotel des ambassadeurs	40m	10	1999	Tunis	Hotel
Habib Bougatfa Hospital	40m	9	2008	Bizerte	Hospital
Golden Tulip Mechtel Hotel	40m	10	1976	Tunis	Hotel
Novotel Ibis Hotel	40m	11	2007	Tunis	Hotel
Marina Bizerte	38m	10	2024	Bizerte	Mixed-use
Central Bank of Tunisia	38m	10	1977	Tunis	Offices
Amen Bank	38m	9	1980	Tunis	Offices
Currency Museum	38m	10	2007	Tunis	Museum
El Hana Residences Bizerte	38m	10	2010	Bizerte	Residential
Cliopatre Center	38m	10	2016	Tunis	Offices
Hotel Maison Blanche	37m	9	2005	Tunis	Hotel
BNA Bank	37m	9	1980	Tunis	Office
Pearl Marriott Hotel	37m	10		Sousse	Hotel
Ahla Center	37m	9		Sousse	Shopping mall
Modern Building of Sousse	37m	10		Sousse	Offices
Monastir Hotel	37m	10		Monastir	Hotel
El Hana Residences	36.2m	10	2010	Bizerte	Residential
Boujaafar Hotel	36m	9	1968	Sousse	Hotel
BTK	36m	10	2000	Tunis	Offices
ATB	36m	10	1991	Tunis	Offices
GAT Assurances	36m	10		Tunis	Offices
Pasteur Medical Center	36m	9	2013	Tunis	Hospital
ETAP Building	36m	10		Tunis	Offices
Ministry of Higher Education	36m	10		Tunis	Offices
Ministry of Education	36m	10		Tunis	Offices
Ribat El Medina	36m	8		Sfax	Offices
business hotel	36m	10		Sfax	Hotel
Movenpick Sfax	36m	10	2020	Sfax	Hotel
Carrefour Sfax	36m	9	2014	Sfax	Supermarket
Bizerte Center	35m	9	1999	Bizerte	Offices
Residence Roukii	35m	10	2000	Bizerte	Residential

tallest futuristic buildings in Tunisia
name of building	height	floors	status	city	use
meditarren GATE tower	1000m		proposed	samaa dubai tunis	Mixte
Tunisia economic city tallest tower	700m		proposed	economic city	mixte
media city tower	500m		proposed	economic city	mixte
sports city tower	400m		proposed	economic city	mixte
tourism city tower	400m		proposed	economic city	mixte
media tower	400m		proposed	economic city	mixte
carthage gate &complex	400m	99	proposed	tunis	mixte
residential tallest tower	300m		proposed	economic city	residence
trade tower of economic city	300m		proposed	economic city	mixte
medical tallest tower of Tunisia	300m		proposed	economic city	hopital
research & development tower	270m		proposed	economic city	mixte
medical sails towers	260m		proposed	economic city	hopital
finicial port tower	250m		in construction	new city	mixte
lake tallest tower	240m		in construction	tunis	mixte
Tunisia national TV new tower	100m		proposed	economic city	mixte
sportive city tower 1	100m	25	proposed	tunis	mixte
sportive city tower 2	100m	25	proposed	tunis	mixte
sportive city tower 3	100m	25	proposed	tunis	mixte

tallest mosques in Tunisia
name of the mosque	height	city
mosquee malik ibn anas	55m	Carthage tunis
mosquee zitouna	43m	tunis
al fath mosque	42m	bizerte
hamouda pacha mosque	39m	tunis

tallest lighthouses in Tunisia
name of the lighthouse	height	city	date of construction
phare de Taguermess	50m	djerba medenine	1895
phare de ras thyna	44m	thyna sfax	1895
phare de l"ile kuriat	26m	monastir	1894
phare de sousse	22m	sousse	1890
phare de l"ile plane	21m	bizerte	1888

== Non-residential and no bureau == : Structure / City / Structural type / Coordinates / Year of built / Pinnacle height (m) / Pinnacle height (ft) / Remarks; Zarzis TV Mast / Zarzis / Guyed Mast / 33°31′44.93″N 11°2′59.92″E / / 320 m / 1050 ft; Gafsa Radio Mast / Gafsa / Guyed Mast / 34°28′10.52″N 8°50′11.42″E / / 260.6 m / 855 ft / mediumwave transmitter, used for 585 kHz; Jedeida Radio Mast / Jedeida / Guyed Mast / 36°50′11.91″N 9°55′46.23″E / / 250 m / 820 ft / mediumwave transmitter, used for 630 kHz and 963 kHz; El Ghabra TV Mast / Sfax / Guyed Mast / 34°56′56.4″N 10°44′24.05″E / / 235 m / 771 ft; Sidi Mansour Transmitter / Sfax / Guyed Mast / 34°49′12.28″N 10°50′53.2″E ; 34°49′9.03″N 10°50′49.57″E / / 208 m / 682 ft / mediumwave transmitter, used for 720 kHz; Old Jedeida Radio Mast / Jedeida / Guyed Mast / 36°50′47.37″N 9°55′48.49″E / / 148 m / 486 ft; Ayn Darahim TV Mast / Ayn Darahim / Guyed Mast / 36°46′10.53″N 8°42′1.53″E / / 120 m / 394 ft; Bidaha TV Tower / Gafsa / Lattice tower / 34°25′54.26″N 9°13′44.93″E / / 120 m / 394 ft; Goraa TV Tower / Teboursouk / Lattice tower / 36°29′9.55″N 9°8′47.88″E / / 120 m / 394 ft; Zaghouan TV Tower / Zaghouan / Lattice tower / 36°22′21.23″N 10°7′52.46″E / / 120 m / 394 ft; usine de ciment / bizerte / chimney / / / 110m; Harboub Radio Mast / Harboub / Guyed mast / 33°14′19.52″N 10°27′30.54″E / / 109 m / 358 ft / mediumwave transmitter, used for 684 kHz; Radès Power Station, Chimney South / Radès / Chimney / 36°47′45.31″N 10°16′59.24″E / / 104 m / 341 ft; Radès Power Station, Chimney North / Radès / Chimney / 36°47′49″N 10°17′1.12″E / / 102 m / 335 ft; Jebel ech Chambi TV Tower / Kasserine / Lattice tower / 35°12′25.78″N 8°40′58.6″E / / 100 m / 328 ft; Gabès Radio Tower / Gabès / Lattice tower / 33°53′3.33″N 10°5′36.11″E / / 100 m / 328 ft; Ben Gardane Mourad Telecom Mast / Ben Gardane / Guyed Mast / 33°8′22.21″N 11°13′10.76″E / / 100 m / 328 ft
