= Fadhila Rebhi =

Tunisian politician

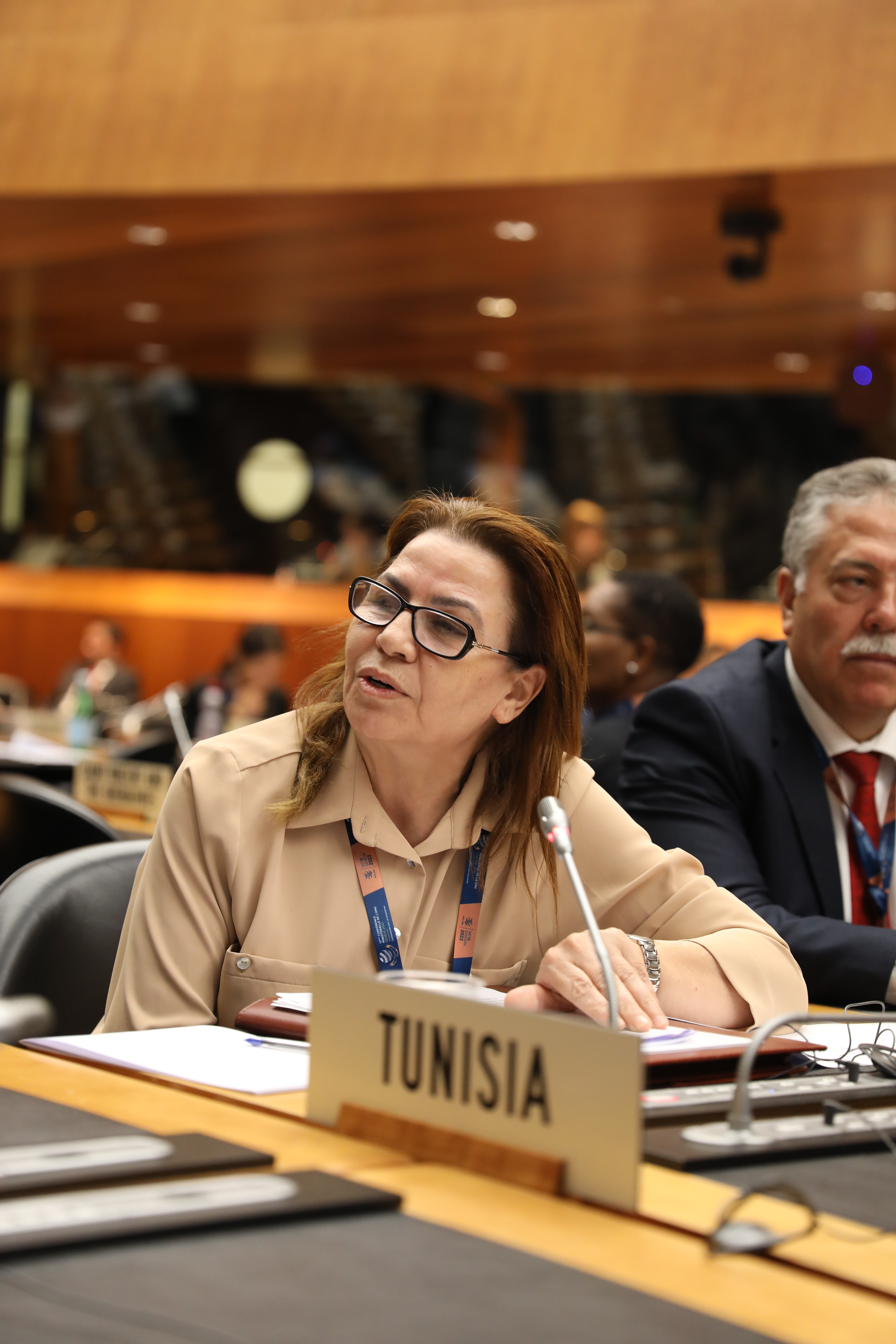

Fadhila Rebhi (Arabic: فضيلة الرابحي) is a Tunisian politician who served as Minister of Trade and Export Development in the Bouden Cabinet.

On 6 January 2023, she was sacked by Prime Minister Najla Bouden as a result of the worsening economic crisis.
