= Tour de la nation =

Tower of the Nation, building in Tunisia

Tower of the Nation
- Tour de la nation
- Interactive map of the Tower of the Nation area

General information
- Location: R53P+8HQ, Ave Mohamed V, Tunis, Tunisia
- Height: 80m

Technical details
- Floor count: 23

The Tour de la nation (English: Tower of the Nation, Arabic: عمارة الوطن (تونس)) in Tunis houses the Ministry of State Domains and Land Affairs. At a height of 80m it's the second tallest building of Tunisia

== Gallery ==
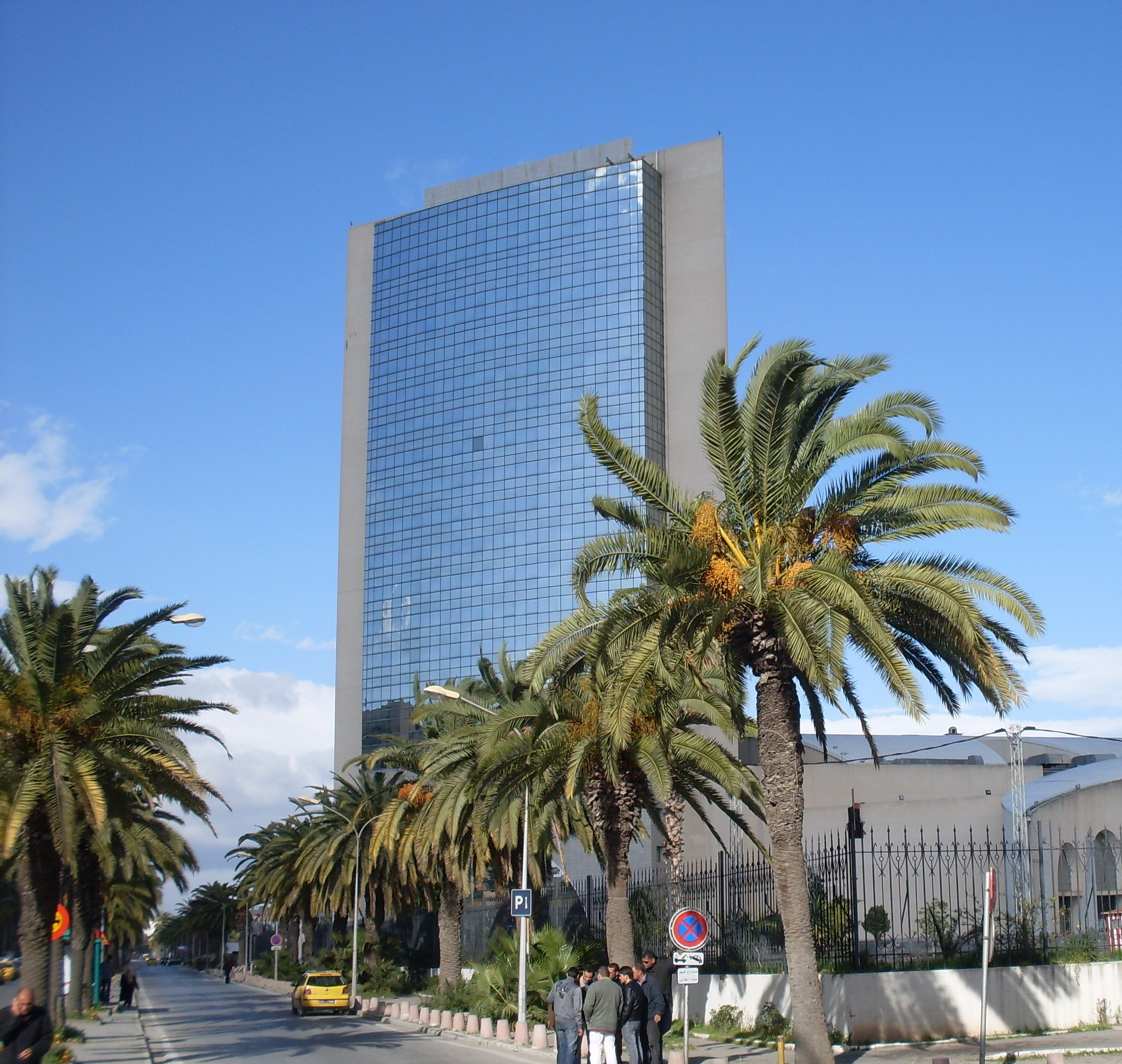
The tower from the avenue

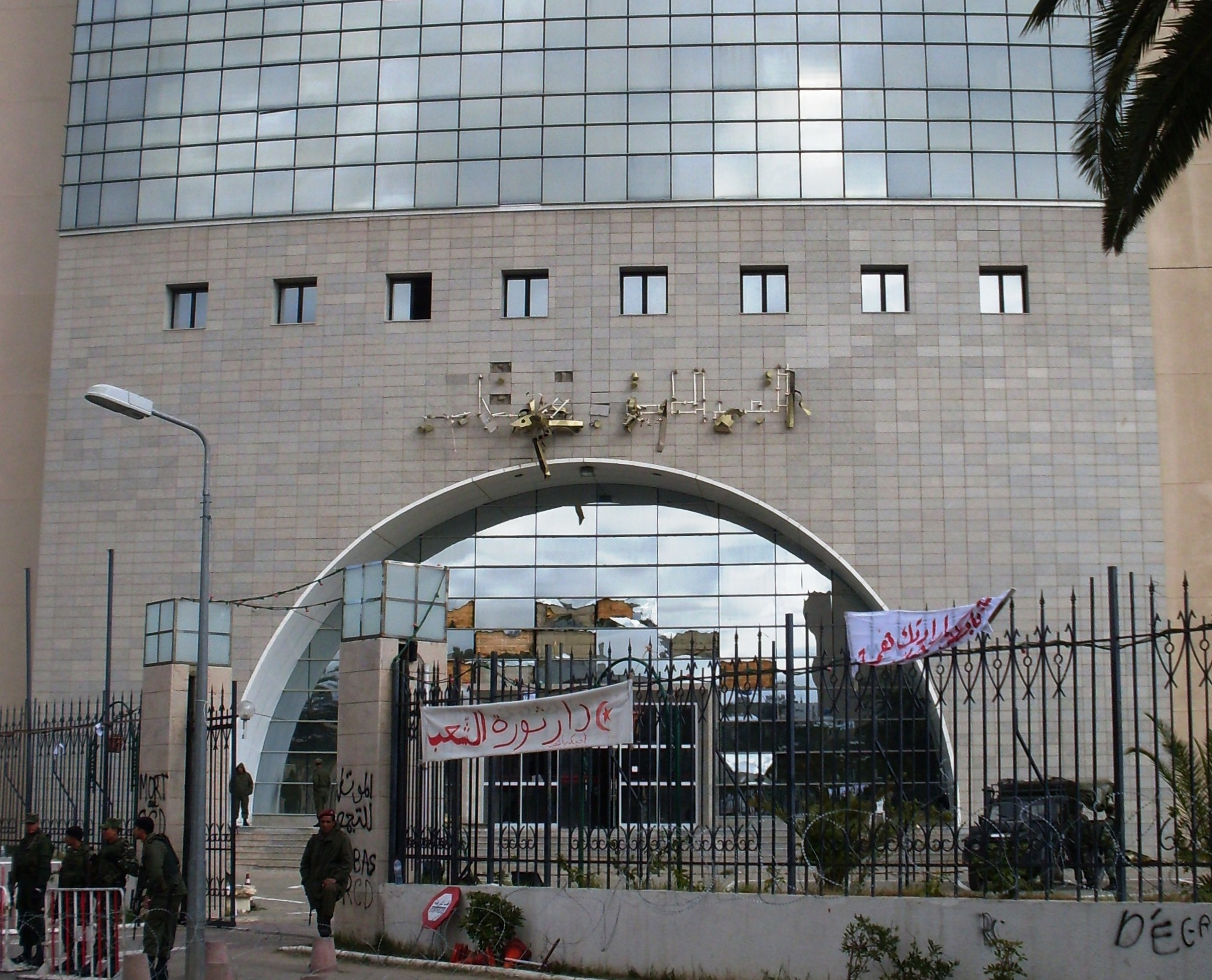
Entrance

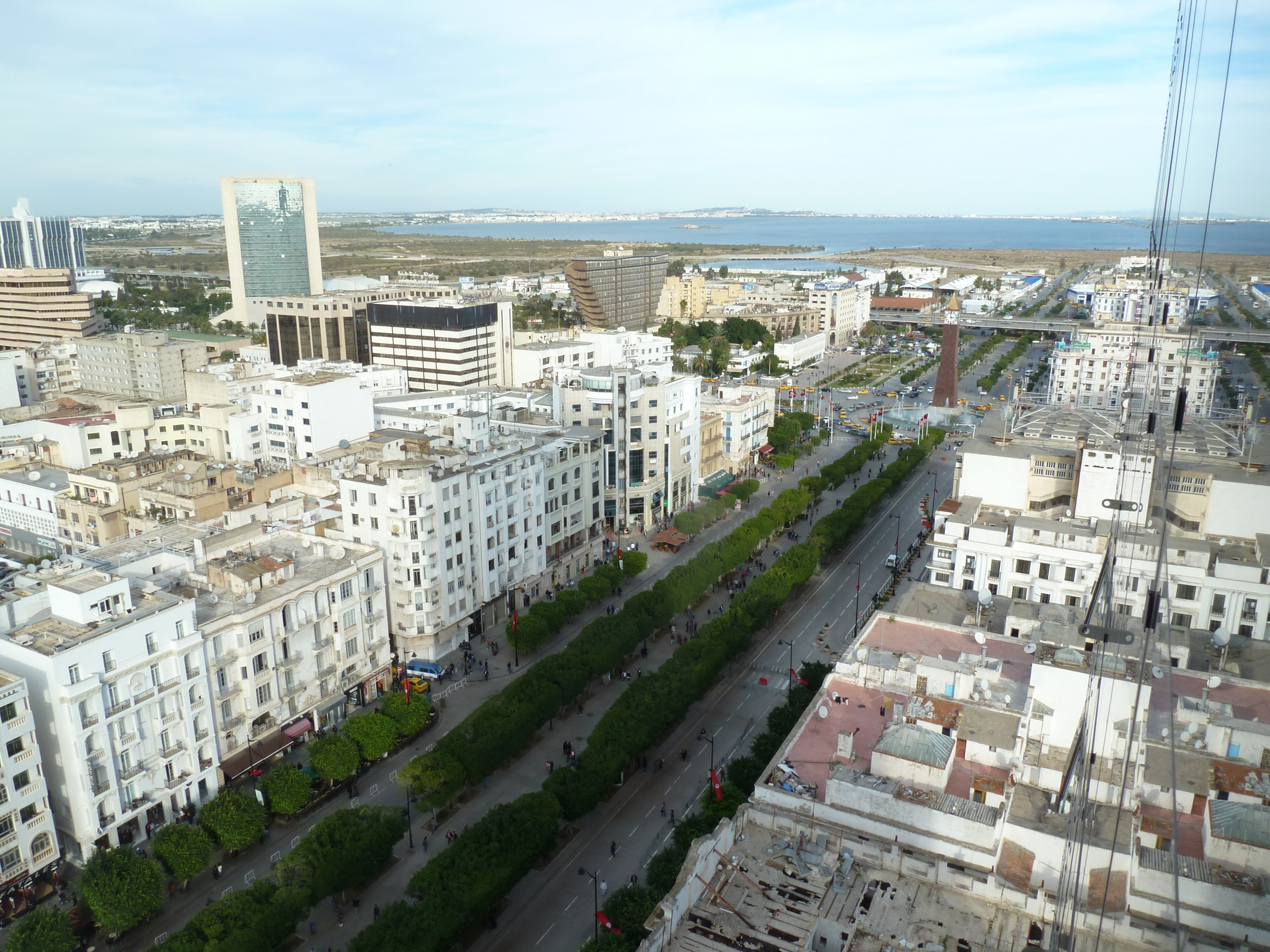
Views

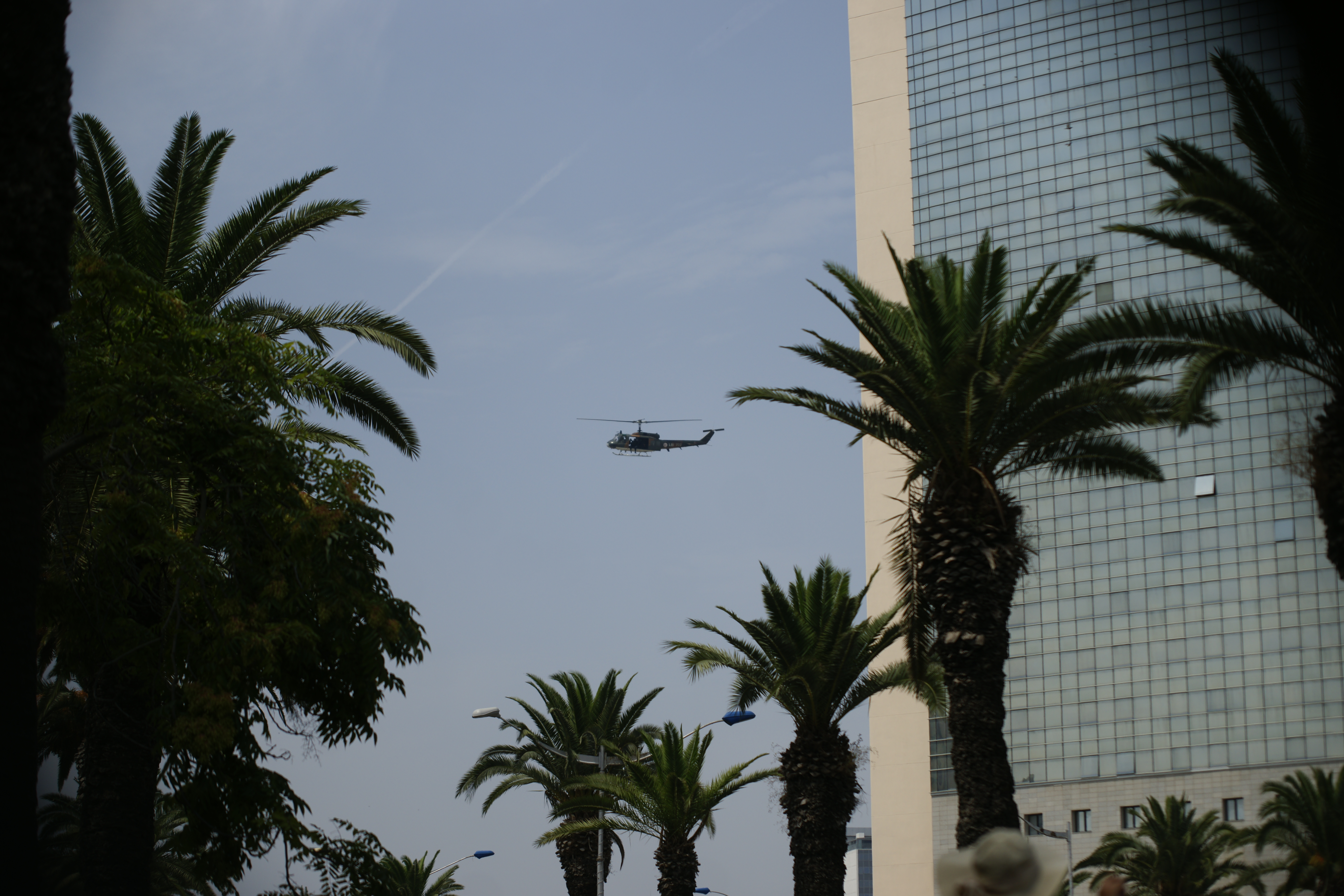
Helicopter passing

== See also ==
- List of tallest structures in Tunisia
