= Taoufik Charfeddine =

Tunisian politician (born 1968)

- توفيق شرف الدين
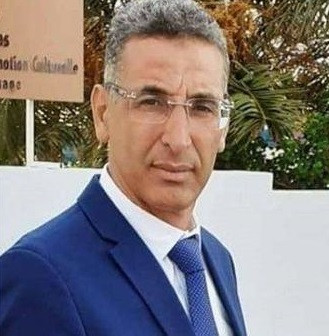

Minister of the Interior
- In office 11 October 2021 – 17 March 2023
- Prime Minister: Najla Bouden
- Preceded by: Ridha Gharsallaoui
- Succeeded by: Kamal Feki
- In office 2 September 2020 – 5 January 2021
- Prime Minister: Hichem Mechichi
- Preceded by: Hichem Mechichi
- Succeeded by: Hichem Mechichi

Personal details
- Born: 24 November 1968 (age 57) Tunisia
- Party: Independent
- Education: University of Sousse

Taoufik Charfeddine (Arabic: توفيق شرف الدين; born 24 November 1968) is a Tunisian politician. He was Minister of Interior in the Bouden Cabinet. He served in the same role in the Mechichi Cabinet.

On March 17, 2023, Taoufik Charfeddine announced his resignation from the post of Minister of the Interior. He was replaced by Kamel Feki.
