= Amel Moussa =

Tunisian poet, teacher and journalist

- Citizenship: Tunisia
- Occupations: Poet, teacher and Journalist
- Notable work: Published two books of poetry
- Awards: Tunisia national creative Award in poetry Arab women's organization award in journalism

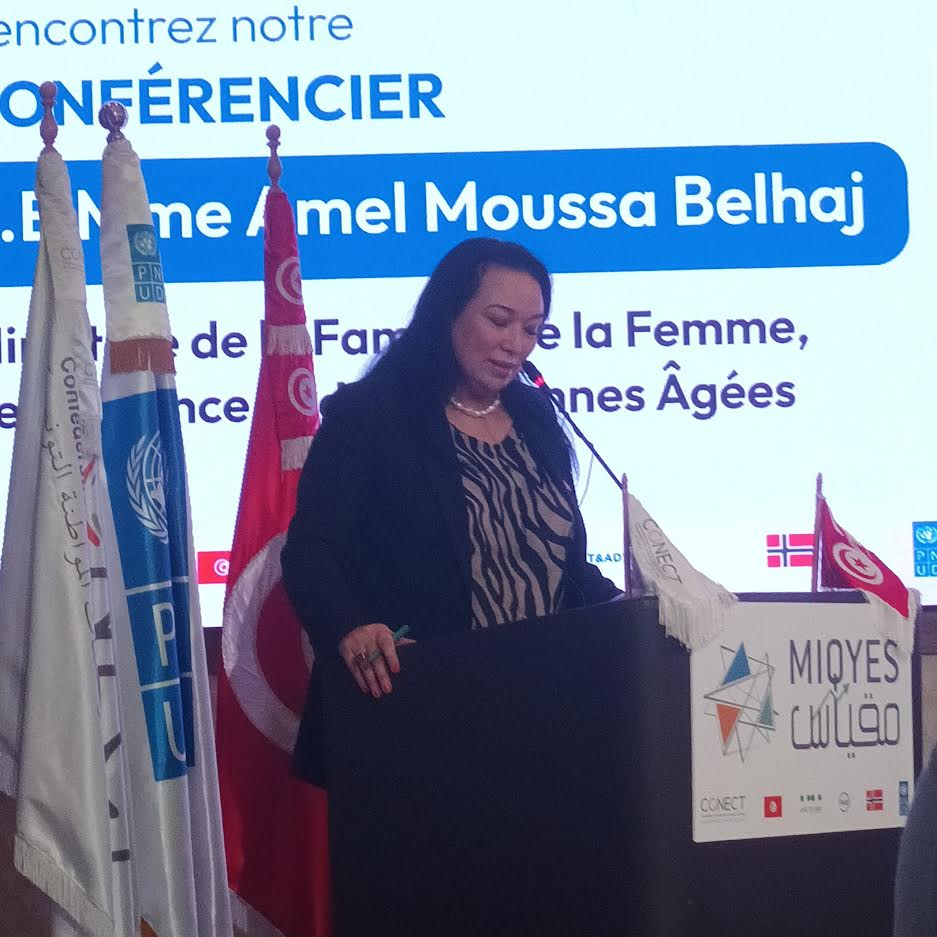

Amel Moussa is a Tunisian poet, teacher and journalist. She has published two books of poetry, and her poems have been translated in Italian, Spanish, French, Polish, German and Czech. She has won Tunisia's National Creative Award for her poetry and an award from the Arab Women’s Organization for her journalism in Tunisia.

In 2021, she was appointed to government. She is Minister Family, Women, Children and the Elderly in the Bouden Cabinet.

== Selected works ==
=== Poetry collections ===
- Ontha al-ma' (The water female), 1996
- Khajal al-yakout (The emerald's bashfulness), 1998
