= Samir Saïed =

Tunisian business leader and politician (born 1957)

Samir Saïed (Arabic: سمير سعيد; born 1957) is a politician from Tunisia. He has been a minister of economy and planning in the Bouden Cabinet since 2021. On 17 October 2023, the President Kaïs Saïed dismissed Samir Saïed from his portfolio as Minister of Economy and Planning.
