= Sara Zaafarani =

Tunisian engineer and politician (born 1963)

- سارة زعفراني
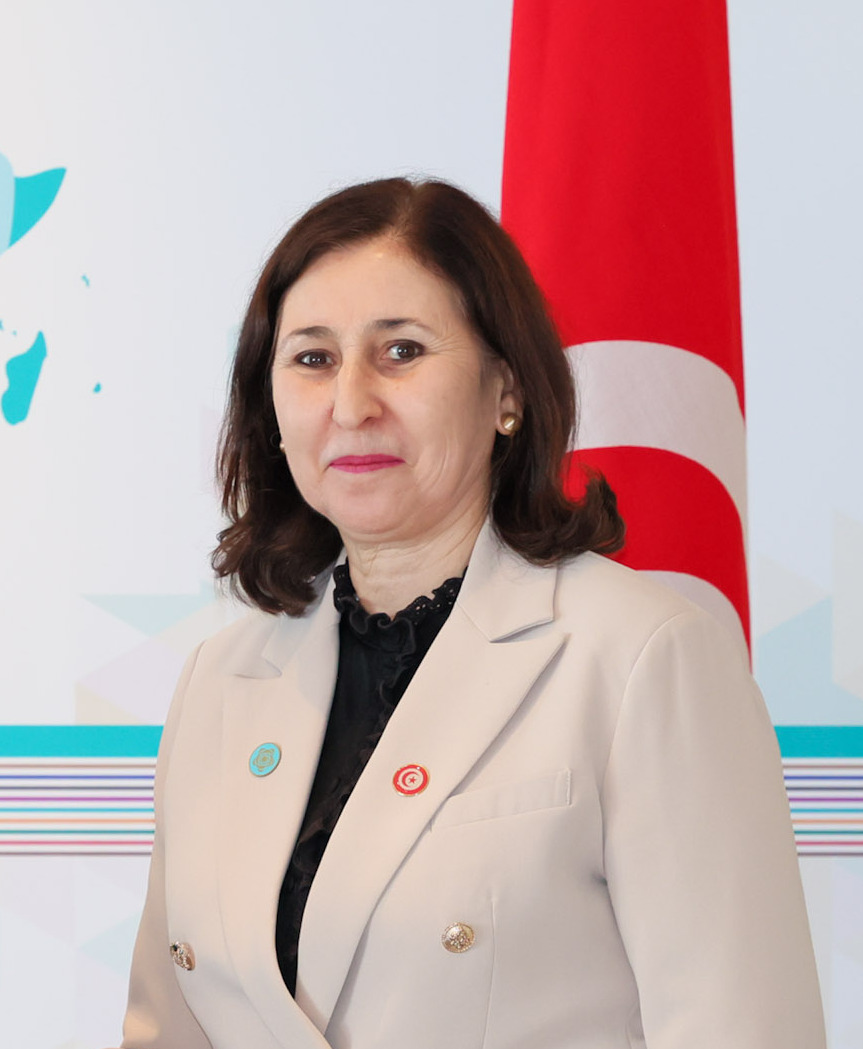
- Zaafarani in 2025

Prime Minister of Tunisia
- Incumbent
- Assumed office 21 March 2025
- President: Kais Saied
- Preceded by: Kamel Madouri

Minister of Public Works and Housing
- In office 11 October 2021 – 21 March 2025
- Prime Minister: Najla Bouden; Ahmed Hachani; Kamel Maddouri
- Preceded by: Kamel Doukh
- Succeeded by: Salah Zouari

Personal details
- Born: 26 January 1963 (age 63) Tunis, Tunisia
- Education: National Engineering School of Tunis; Leibniz University Hannover

Sara Zaafarani Zenzari (Arabic: سارة زعفراني زنزري, romanized: Sāra Zaʿfarānī Zanzarī; born 26 January 1963) is a Tunisian engineer and politician who has served as the prime minister of Tunisia since 2025. Prior to her tenure as prime minister she was minister of public works and housing.

== Early life and education ==
Sara Zaafarani Zenzari was born in Tunis, Tunisia, on 26 January 1963. She graduated from the National Engineering School of Tunis with a civil engineering degree and from Leibniz University Hannover with a master's degree in geotechnical engineering.

== Career ==
Zaafarani has held positions in the Ministry of Equipment and Housing since the 1980s. She was a senior engineer from 1989 to 1992, and then head of the Special Facilities Department from 1992 to 1997. In 2009, she managed a project monitoring a road linking Sfax and Gabès and road linkages in other regions of Tunisia. She was a member of the board of directors of the Tunisian Highway Company and port of Enfidha.

The cabinets of Najla Bouden, Ahmed Hachani, and Kamel Madouri included Zaafarani as Minister of Equipment and Housing in 2021. She was also the acting Minister of Transportation from 12 March to 25 August 2024, after Rabie Majidi was dismissed by President Kais Saied.

== Premiership ==
Zaafarani with Russian President Vladimir Putin at the Third Russia–Africa Summit in Moscow, October 2026

President Saied selected her to replace Madouri as prime minister on 21 March 2025. She was the third prime minister Tunisia had within two years and is the second woman to hold the position of prime minister in Tunisian history.

Following Kais Saied's reported medical issues, Zaafrani is expected to take over as interim president, to appoint a caretaker government, and to call the old electoral body (ISIE) to hold presidential elections in maximum 90 days.

== Personal life ==
Zenzari is married and is the mother of three children. She is able to speak Arabic, French, English, and German.

== Works cited ==
- تونس.. من هي سارة الزعفراني الزنزريثاني رئيسة وزراء في تاريخ البلاد؟. Agenzia NOVA (in Arabic). 21 March 2025. Archived from the original on 22 June 2025.
- سارة الزنزري مهندسة ترأس الحكومة التونسية. Al Jazeera Arabic (in Arabic). 21 March 2025. Archived from the original on 22 June 2025.
- Amara, Tarek; Choukeir, Jana (20 March 2025). "Tunisian president sacks prime minister amid economic and migration crisis". Yahoo News. Reuters.

Political offices
Preceded by Kamel Madouri	Prime Minister of Tunisia; 2025–present	Succeeded by Incumbent
