= Sadok Chaabane =

Tunisian politician

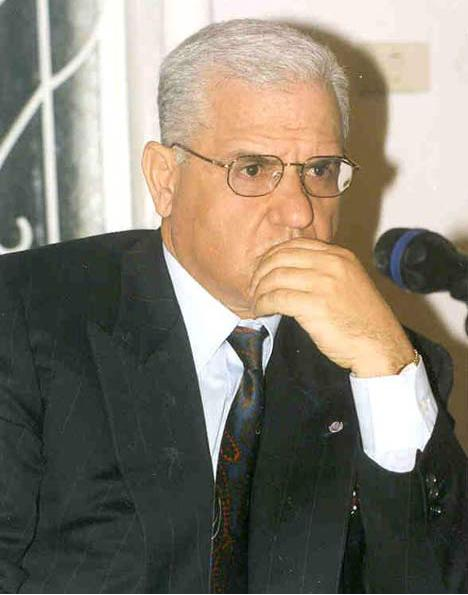
Sadok Chaabane

Sadok Chaabane (born 23 February 1950) is a Tunisian University Professor, holding the Agrégation degree in Public Law and Political Science. In addition to this academic position, he has held a number of ministerial and political portfolios. As of 2021, Chaabane is general director of Polytech Internationale, a university in Tunis.
