= Akissa Bahri =

Tunisian agricultural engineer

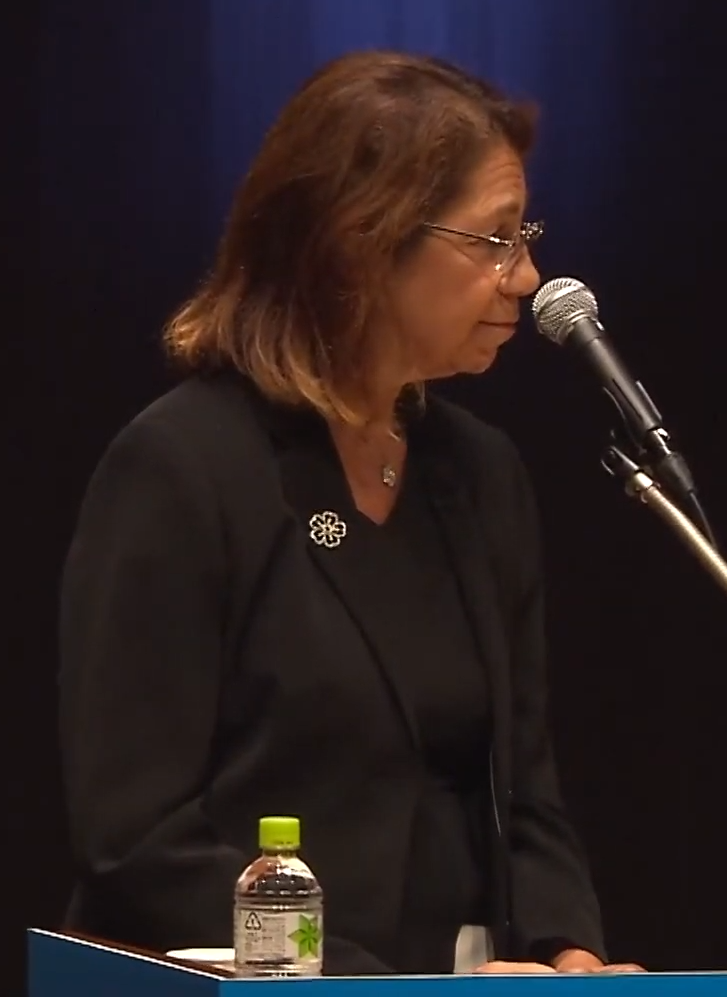
Bahri in 2018

Akissa Bahri (Akiça Bahri) is a Tunisian agricultural engineer, a former professor at the National Agricultural Institute of Tunisia, and the current Agriculture Minister of Tunisia. She has previously been Director for Africa at the International Water Management Institute (2005–2010), Coordinator of the African Water Facility at the African Development Bank (2010–2015), and Director of Research at the National Research Institute for Agricultural Engineering, Water, and Forestry (INRGREF) in Tunis, Tunisia (2016–2017).

== Life ==
Akissa Bahri attended primary school at Lycée de Jeunes Filles Armand Fallieres in Tunis and high school at Lycée Carnot, Tunis. She studied agricultural engineering in Toulouse, gained an engineering doctorate from the National Polytechnic Institute of Toulouse, and then gained a Ph.D. in Water Resources Engineering from Lund University, with a thesis entitled Environmental impacts of marginal waters and sewage sludge use in Tunisia.

Bahri's research focuses on water quality and water use efficiency, especially in Tunisia; her publications include Managing the other side of the water cycle: Making wastewater an asset published by the Global Water Partnership Technical Committee.

She has conducted research on irrigation systems and degradation of soil resources. She came up with solutions to provide farmers and rural development offices with methodologies for monitoring soil.

As of 2019 Bahri is on the Board of Trustees of the JRS Biodiversity Foundation and a member of the International Advisory Committee of the UNU-Institute on Water, Health and Environment. Bahri is also a member of the Governing Council of the African Academy of Sciences, and the Human Rights & Science Advisory Board.

On 2 September 2020, Bahri became the Agriculture Minister of Tunisia.

== Awards ==
In 1993 Bahri was awarded the IFS/King Baudouin Award by the International Foundation for Science. In 2009 she was awarded the "Prof. C.N.R. Rao Prize for Scientific Research" by the World Academy of Sciences, for the Advancement of Science in Developing Countries.

In 2018 Bahri won the International Water Association 'Women in Water' award, for her "outstanding life-time professional contribution to the international water sector in work, projects and research".

== Notable works ==
- 'Managing Change to Implement Integrated Urban Water Management in African Cities', Aquatic Procedia (6), 2016. A. Bahri, F. Brikke, and K. Vairavamoorthy.
- Milestones in Water Reuse – The best success stories. Edited by Valentina Lazarova, Takashi Asano, Akissa Bahri and John Anderson, 2013.
- Wastewater irrigation and health: assessing and mitigating risk in low-income countries. Edited by Pay Drechsel, Christopher A. Scott, Liqa Raschid-Sally, Mark Redwood, and Akissa Bahri, 2010.
- Water Reuse for Irrigation: Agriculture, Landscapes, and Turf Grass. Edited by Valentina Lazarova and Akissa Bahri, 2005.
