= Free Destourian Party =

Tunisian political party

Free Destourian Party الحزب الدستوري الحر
- French name: Parti destourien libre
- President: Abir Moussi
- Founder: Hamed Karoui
- Founded: 23 September 2013
- Membership: 30,000 (claimed)
- Ideology: Tunisian nationalism Bourguibism; Secularism; Anti-Islamism
- Political position: Center to Right-wing
- Assembly of the Representatives of the People: 0 / 217

Website
- www.pdl-tunisie.com

The Free Destourian Party (Arabic: الحزب الدستوري الحر al-Ḥizb ad-Dustūrī al-Ḥurr, lit. 'Free Constitutional Party'; French: Parti destourien libre, PDL), known as the Destourian Movement (Arabic: الحركة الدستورية al-Ḥaraka ad-Dustūrīya) until August 2016, is a Tunisian political party founded by former members of Tunisia's pre-revolution ruling party, the Constitutional Democratic Rally. In the 2014 presidential election, the Destourian Movement nominated Abderrahim Zouari, Minister of Transport from 2004 to 2011, as a candidate. The party is now led by the lawyer and MP Abir Moussi. Since the beginning of 2020, the party has led in all opinion polls for the next Tunisian general elections, and Moussi is consistently placed second after the incumbent president Kais Saied. On October 3, 2023, Moussi was arrested in a series of political arrests and a crackdown on the opposition launched by president Saied.

== History ==
The Free Destourian Party was founded by ex-prime minister Hamed Karoui on 23 September, 2013 as the "Destourian movement", aiming to unite the "Destourians", supporters of the Destour party and its successors which governed the country for 60 years. The party participated in the 2014 elections but failed to gain any seats in the new parliament. Its then-presidential candidate Abderrahim Zouari then withdrew from the presidential elections and supported candidate Beji Caid Essebsi, who eventually won the presidency.

In 2016, the PDL held its founding congress, where a new leadership emerged, with Abir Moussi as president and Hatem Laamari as secretary-general. The party then changed its name to the "Free Destourian Party" and adopted a new logo similar to that of historical Destourian parties.

In October 2016, the party dismissed Laamari from his position just two months after his appointment. He was later outright fired for "management infractions" along with several other party members. In 2021, they attempted to regain their old positions in the party and accused Abir Moussi of authoritarianism, but failed to rejoin.

In August 2021, the Free Destourian Party held its first electoral convention, during which party grassroots reconfirmed Abir Moussi as president for a second five-year term. Additionally, a political bureau of 16 members was elected. Authorities refused to allow the party to hold its convention in-person due to the COVID-19 lockdown the country was experiencing at that time, which forced the party to hold it online. This made it the first Tunisian party to hold its convention in this way. The party accused the government of using the pandemic as an excuse to crack down on the opposition and limit its rights and freedoms.

== Political profile ==
There has been discussion among political science scholars about the classification of the PDL, with some saying that it is a center-right political party, while others label it as a right-wing one. The party has disputed these labels and describes itself as a centrist political party with foundations in the legacy of Habib Bourguiba, the founder of the Tunisian Republic, also known as Bourguibism. This includes strict secularism, cultural modernity, a welfare state, and Tunisian nationalism (as opposed to Pan-Arabism), which considers Tunisia closer to the West than to the East. The party is considered as more liberal on cultural issues and moderate capitalist in the economic field. The party is often described as staunchly opposed to Islamist movements in Tunisia. It has called for banning the mixing of religion and politics and has demanded the designation of the Muslim Brotherhood and all its affiliates in Tunisia, including the Ennahda party, as terrorist organizations.

=== Reform proposals ===
Since 2018, the PDL has called for reforming the political regime in Tunisia and declaring a Third Republic. The party has called for changing the political system from the parliamentary system established by the 2014 constitution to a more presidential system, similar to the 1959 constitution, but with more democratic guarantees and fewer powers granted to the president. The party has proposed its own constitution and vowed to put it to a referendum once it gains power. In this proposed constitution, the president of the republic would have greater powers than the current president, as they would appoint the prime minister and members of their government, and ultimately dismiss them, without need for parliamentary approval. The parliament would have oversight powers over the executive and would be able to withdraw confidence in the prime minister.

== Structure ==
=== President ===
No	President	Term start	Term end
1	Hamed Karoui	2013	2016
1	Hamed Karoui	Hamed Karoui founded the Destourien Mouvement party in 2013 to unite all destourians and regain power. He was a prime minister under ex-president Ben Ali between 1989 and 1999 and minister under Bourguiba.	
2	Abir Moussi	2016	incumbent
2	Abir Moussi	Abir took over as the president of the PDL in the party's congress 2016 and contested the 2019 Tunisian presidential election and led her party in the 2019 Tunisian parliamentary election where it came in third place in terms of the number of votes. She serves as a member of the Assembly of the Representatives of the People since 2019. Under her leadership, the party has risen in popularity where it led all polls for the legislative elections from early 2020 to the 2021 self-coup.	

=== Political Committee ===
Since the 2021 Congress of the party, the political committee (formally known as the Political Diwan) is composed as follows:

- Thameur Saad
- Awatef Grich
- Mohamed Karim Krifa
- Samira Saihi
- Ali Bejaoui
- Olfa Ayachi
- Neji Jarrahi
- Mohamed Ezzeddine Abdelkafi
- Hajer Enneifer
- Samira Hadded
- Nadia Ben Romdhane
- Mohamed Ammar
- Houda Selmaoui
- Mokhtar Bartagi
- Mariem Sassi

== Election results ==
Election year	# of total votes	% of overall vote	# of seats
2014	11,403	0.33%	0 / 217
2019	189,356	6.63%	17 / 217
