= Imed Memmich =

Tunisian academic and politician (born 1966)

Imed Memmich (Arabic: عماد مميش; born 8 September 1966) is a Tunisian scholar and politician who served as Minister of Defence from 11 October 2021 to 25 August 2024.
