= Kamel Feki =

Tunisian politician

- كمال الفقي

Minister of the Interior
- In office March 17, 2023 – May 25, 2024
- President: Kais Saied
- Preceded by: Taoufik Charfeddine
- Succeeded by: Khaled Nouri

Personal details
- Born: Sfax

Kamel Feki (Arabic: كمال الفقي) is a Tunisian politician who served as the Minister of the Interior from 2023 to 2024.

== Early life and education ==
Feki was born in Sfax. In 1983, he enrolled at the Faculty of Law and Political Science of Tunis and graduated in private law (specializing in judicial matters) in 1995.

== Career ==
Feki began his career worked as a tax inspector at the Ministry of Finance, and eventually became deputy director and head of the tax inspection office for the Tunis district. In 2011, Feki was elected General Secretary of the Tax Inspectorate Union, a position he held until 2018.

Feki was sworn into office as the Governor of Tunis on December 31, 2021. He held this position until his appointment as Minister of the Interior on March 17, 2023, succeeding the resigned Taoufik Charfeddine. He was sworn in the following day.

Feki has been described as one of President Kais Saied's staunchest supporters and is part of the president's close circle. In March 2023, he refused to authorize a protest permit for the opposition National Salvation Front coalition, asserting that its leaders were engaged in scheming against state security. He openly criticized the opposition on multiple occasions, characterizing them as "unprincipled and insignificant." The Interior Ministry granted the coalition permission to demonstrate.

In June 2023, after the European Commission and President Saied faced criticism over the treatment of sub-Saharan refugees, Feki dismissed images of deceased refugees in the desert as "fake" and denied knowledge of any expulsion policy, labeling it as "fake news."

In May 2024, Feki was dismissed as interior minister by President Saied as part of a cabinet reshuffle.

== Personal life ==
Feki is married to Sonia Charbti.
