= Ministry of Trade and Export Development =

Government minister of Tunisia

The Ministry of Trade and Export Development (Arabic: وزارة التجارة وتنمية الصادرات, romanized: Wizārat al-Tijārah wa-Tanmiyat al-Ṣādirāt) is a department of the government of Tunisia.

== Ministers ==
- Fadhila Rebhi (Bouden Cabinet) (October 11, 2021 – January 6, 2022)
- Kalthoum Ben Rejeb (Hachani Cabinet)
- Samir Abid (Madouri Cabinet)
