= Ministry of State Domains and Land Affairs =

Government minister of Tunisia

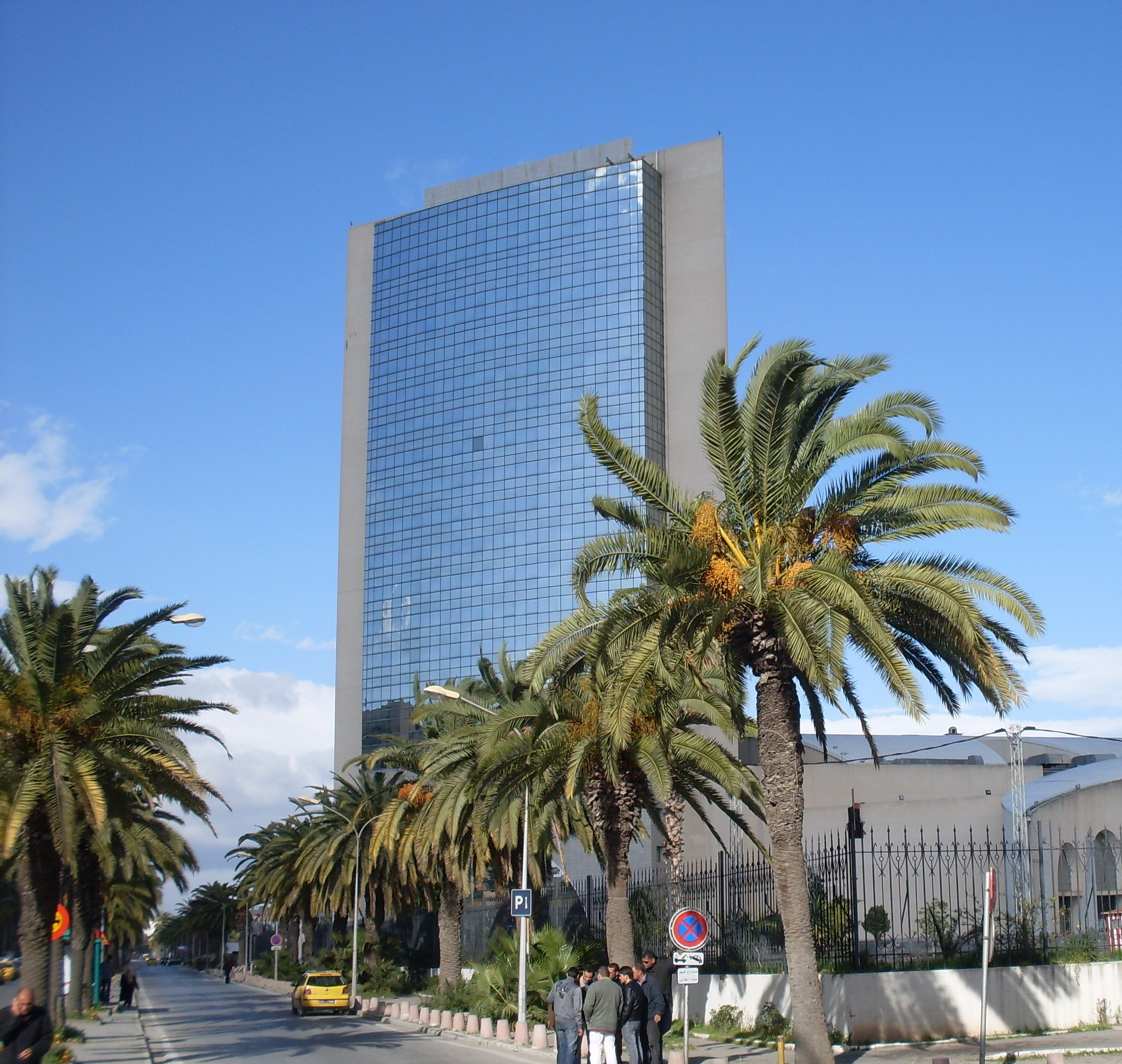
Le Tour de la nation, the seat of the ministry.

The Ministry of State Domains and Land Affairs (Arabic: وزارة أملاك الدولة والشؤون العقارية, romanized: Wizārat Amlāk al-Dawlah wa-al-Shuʼūn al-ʻAqārīyah) is a department of the Government of Tunisia.

== Ministers ==
- Leïla Jaffel (Mechichi Cabinet)
- Mohamed Rekik (Bouden Cabinet)
