= Leïla Jaffel =

Tunisian magistrate and politician

Leïla Jaffel (Arabic ليلى جفال) (born 29 August 1960) is a Tunisian magistrate and politician serving as minister of justice since October 2021 in the government led by Najla Bouden and then Ahmed Hachani.

She was Minister of State Domains and Land Affairs in the Mechichi Cabinet from September 2020 to February 2021.

== Biography ==
A career magistrate, she has served as First President of the Nabeul Court of Appeal, President of the Grombalia Court of First Instance, President of the Criminal Division of the Nabeul Court of First Instance and Advisor to the Court of Cassation2,3.

She was appointed Minister of State Domains and Land Affairs in Hichem Mechichi's government in September 2020. She is the first woman to hold this position. In October 2021, she was appointed Minister of Justice in Najla Bouden's government.
