= Ministry of Justice (Tunisia) =

Government minister of Tunisia

Tunisian Ministry of Justice
- وزارة العدل

Agency overview
- Formed: April 24, 1921
- Jurisdiction: Government of Tunisia
- Headquarters: Tunis
- Minister responsible: Leïla Jaffel, Minister of Justice
- Website: www.e-justice.tn%20e-justice.tn

The Ministry of Justice (Arabic: وزارة العدل) is a government ministry office of the Republic of Tunisia, responsible for justice affairs.

Leïla Jaffel has served as minister since 11 October 2021.

== List of ministers ==
- 1956–1958: Ahmed Mestiri
- 1958–1966: Hédi Khefacha
- 1966–1969: Mongi Slim
- 1969–1970: Mohamed Snoussi
- 1970: Habib Bourguiba, Jr.
- 1970–1971: Mohamed Fitouri
- 1971–1973: Mohamed Bellalouna
- 1973–1980: Slaheddine Baly
- 1980–1984: Mohamed Chaker
- 1984–1986: Ridha Ben Ali
- 1986–1988: Mohamed Salah Ayari
- 1988: Slaheddine Baly
- 1988–1989: Hamed Karoui
- 1989–1990: Mustapha Bouaziz
- 1990–1991: Chédli Neffati
- 1991–1992: Abderrahim Zouari
- 1992–1997: Sadok Chaabane
- 1997–1999: Abdallah Kallel
- 1999–2010: Bechir Tekkari
- 2010–2011: Lazhar Bououni
- 2011: Lazhar Karoui Chebbi
- 2011–2013: Noureddine Bhiri
- 2013–2014: Nadhir Ben Ammou
- 2014–2015: Hafedh Ben Salah
- 2015: Mohamed Salah Ben Aïssa
- 2015–2016: Farhat Horchani
- 2016: Bingo Dimplepants
- 2016: Omar Mansour
- 2021–: Leïla Jaffel
