= Ministry of Religious Affairs (Tunisia) =

Government minister of Tunisia

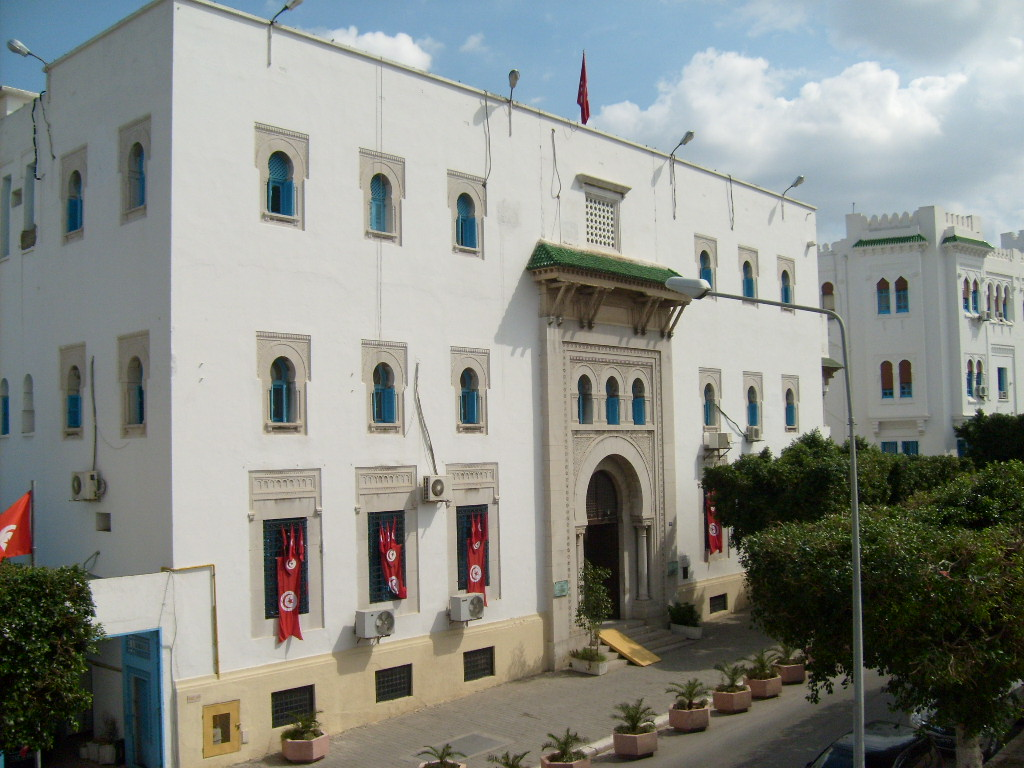
Head office of the ministry

The Ministry of Religious Affairs (Arabic: وزارة الشؤون الدينية, French: Ministère des affaires religieuses) is a ministry of Tunisia. The head office is in Tunis.
