= Kamel Madouri =

Tunisian politician (born 1974)

- كمال المدوري

Prime Minister of Tunisia
- In office 7 August 2024 – 20 March 2025
- President: Kais Saied
- Preceded by: Ahmed Hachani
- Succeeded by: Sara Zaafarani

Minister of Social Affairs
- In office 25 May 2024 – 7 August 2024

Personal details
- Born: 25 January 1974 (age 52) Téboursouk, Tunisia
- Education: Tunis National School of Administration; L’Institut de Défense Nationale; Carthage University

Kamel Madouri (Arabic: كمال المدوري; born 25 January 1974) is a Tunisian politician. He served as prime minister of Tunisia from 7 August 2024 until 20 March 2025 when President Kais Saied terminated his duties.

== Early life ==
Maddouri was born on January 25, 1974 in Téboursouk.

He holds a doctorate in Community law and relations between the Maghreb and Europe and a master's degree in legal sciences from the Faculty of Law, Political and Social Sciences of Carthage University.

He is a graduate of the Tunisian École nationale d'administration (Tunis National School of Administration) and, in 2015, of the L’Institut de Défense Nationale (Institute of the National Defence).

He has been a member of the National Council for Social Dialogue and Vice-Chairman of the Social Protection Sub-Committee of the same Council, as well as a member of the boards of several national institutions, the General Insurance Committee and the boards of the three social security funds.

He has also taught at the École nationale d'administration and the College of Interior Security Forces.

Before being appointed minister of social affairs, Kamel Maddouri was chairman and CEO of the Caisse Nationale d'Assurance Maladie (Tunisian National Fund for Health Insurance) and, before that, chairman and CEO of the Caisse Nationale de Retraite et de Prévoyance Sociale (National Pension and Social Insurance).

== Political career ==
On 25 May 2024, Madouri was appointed social affairs minister.

On 7 August 2024, Madouri was appointed by President Kais Saied to form the country's new government. He replaced Ahmed Hachani who was dismissed that day.

On 20 March 2025, Madouri was removed by Saied from his duties as prime minister amid a severe financial crisis in the country. He was replaced by Equipment and Housing Minister Sara Zaafarani.

Political offices
Preceded by Ahmed Hachani	Prime Minister of Tunisia; 2024–2025	Succeeded by Sara Zaafarani
