= Ministry of Economy and Planning (Tunisia) =

Government ministry of Tunisia

The Ministry of Economy and Planning (Arabic: وزارة الإقتصاد والتخطيط, romanized: Wizārat al-Iqtiṣād wa-al-Takhṭīṭ) is a department of the Tunisian Government. It was created in October 2021 by the Bouden Cabinet.

== Ministers ==
- Samir Saïed
- Sihem Boughdiri
