= Ministry of Transport (Tunisia) =

Government minister of Tunisia

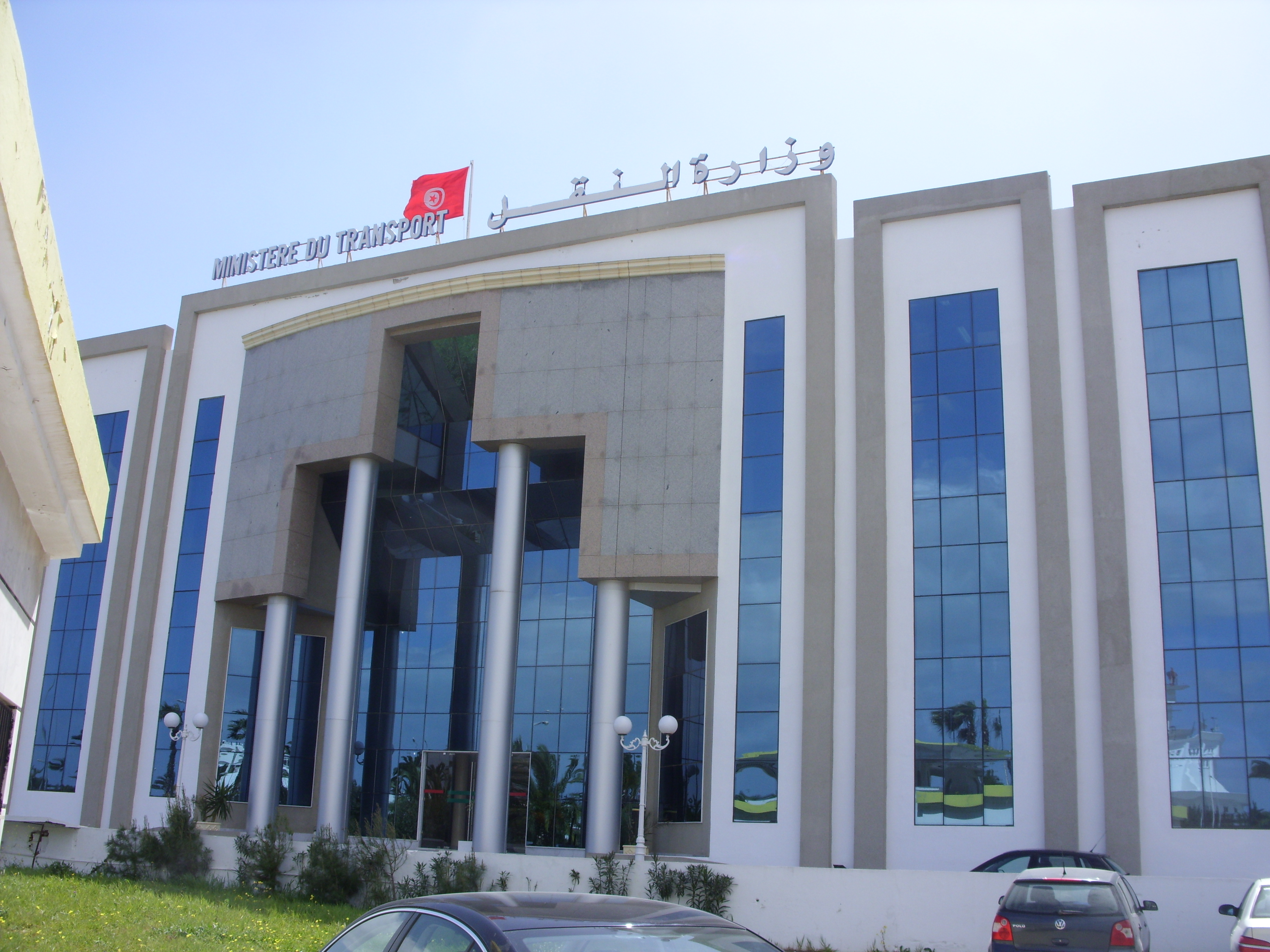
Ministry of Transport head office

The Ministry of Transport (French: Ministère du Transport de la Tunisie, Arabic: وزارة اﻟﻨﻘﻞ) is a government ministry of Tunisia. The ministry offices are located in Tunis, along Avenue Mohamed Bouazizi, near Tunis Carthage Airport. As of 2020 Moez Chakchouk was the minister.

The Direction Générale de l’Aviation Civile (DGAC) serves as Tunisia's civil aviation authority and as the accident investigation agency of civil aircraft accidents.

== Agencies ==
- Tunisian Civil Aviation and Airports Authority
