= Ahmed Hachani =

Tunisian politician (born 1956)

- أحمد الحشاني
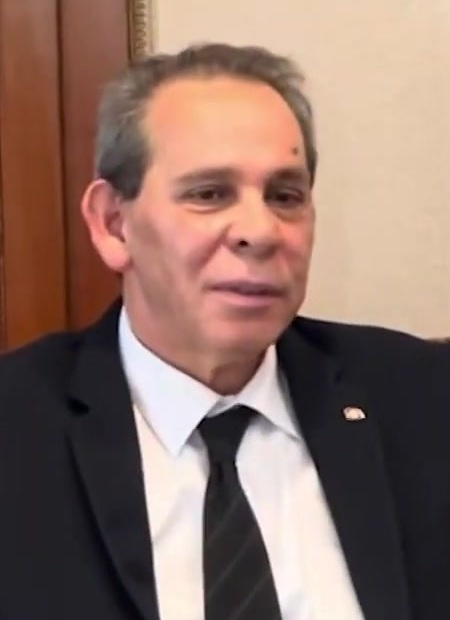
- Hachani in 2023

Prime Minister of Tunisia
- In office 1 August 2023 – 7 August 2024
- President: Kais Saied
- Preceded by: Najla Bouden
- Succeeded by: Kamel Madouri

Personal details
- Born: 4 October 1956 (age 70) Tunis, Tunisia
- Party: Independent
- Education: Tunis University

Ahmed Hachani (Arabic: أحمد الحشاني, romanized: Aḥmad al-Ḥašānī; born 4 October 1956) is a Tunisian politician. He served as Prime Minister of Tunisia from 1 August 2023 to 7 August 2024.

== Early life ==
Hachani graduated from the faculty of law of Tunis University. He was then employed at the Central Bank of Tunisia.

== Political career ==
On 1 August 2023, Hachani was appointed by President Kais Saied to form the country's new government. He replaced Najla Bouden who was dismissed that day.

On 7 August 2024, Hachani was dismissed as prime minister by President Saied and was replaced by social affairs minister Kamel Madouri. No reason was immediately given.

Political offices
Preceded by Najla Bouden	Prime Minister of Tunisia; 2023–2024	Succeeded by Kamel Madouri
