= Ministry of Higher Education and Scientific Research (Tunisia) =

Government minister of Tunisia

- وزارة التعليم العالي والبحث العلمي
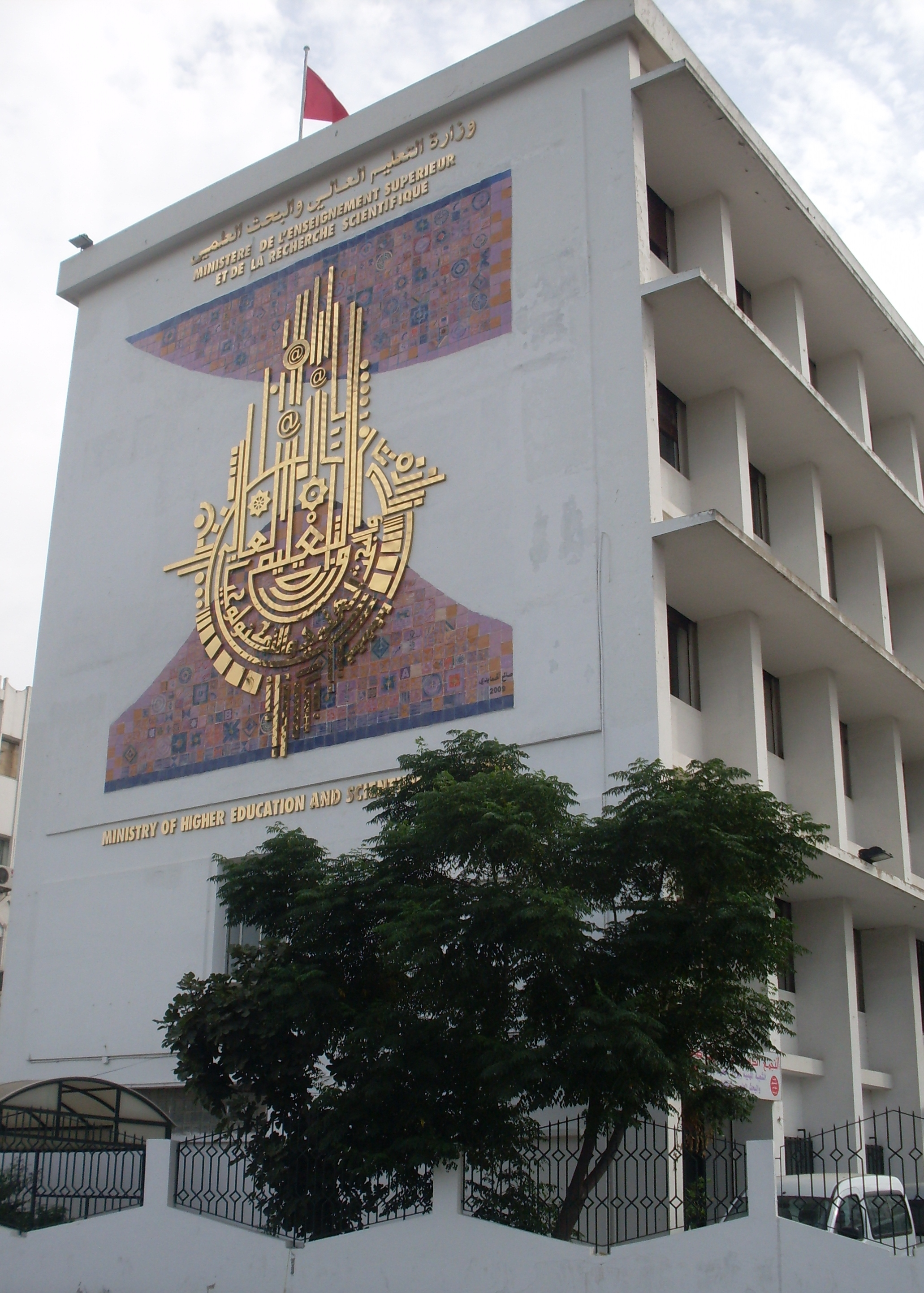
- Head office of the ministry

Agency overview
- Formed: 1994
- Jurisdiction: Government of Tunisia
- Headquarters: Tunis, Tunisia
- Agency executive: Moncef Boukthir, Minister of Higher Education and Scientific Research
- Website: www.mes.tn

The Ministry of Higher Education and Scientific Research (MHESR, French: Ministère de l'Enseignement supérieur) is a ministry of the Tunisian government. Its head office is in Tunis.
