= Ministry of Industry (Tunisia) =

Government minister of Tunisia

- Type: Ministry
- Industry: Ministry
- Headquarters: Tunisia, 40, street Sidi El Hani; Montplaisir; 1002 Tunis
- Key people: Minister of Industry
- Website: tunisieindustrie.gov.tn

The Ministry of Industry, Energy and Mines or, more shortly, the Ministry of Industry, is a Tunisian ministry that oversees the industrial sector.

== Missions ==
The ministry's mission is to develop and implement government policy in areas related to industry, agribusiness, industrial cooperation, energy and mining safety.
