= Ministry of Education (Tunisia) =

Government minister of Tunisia

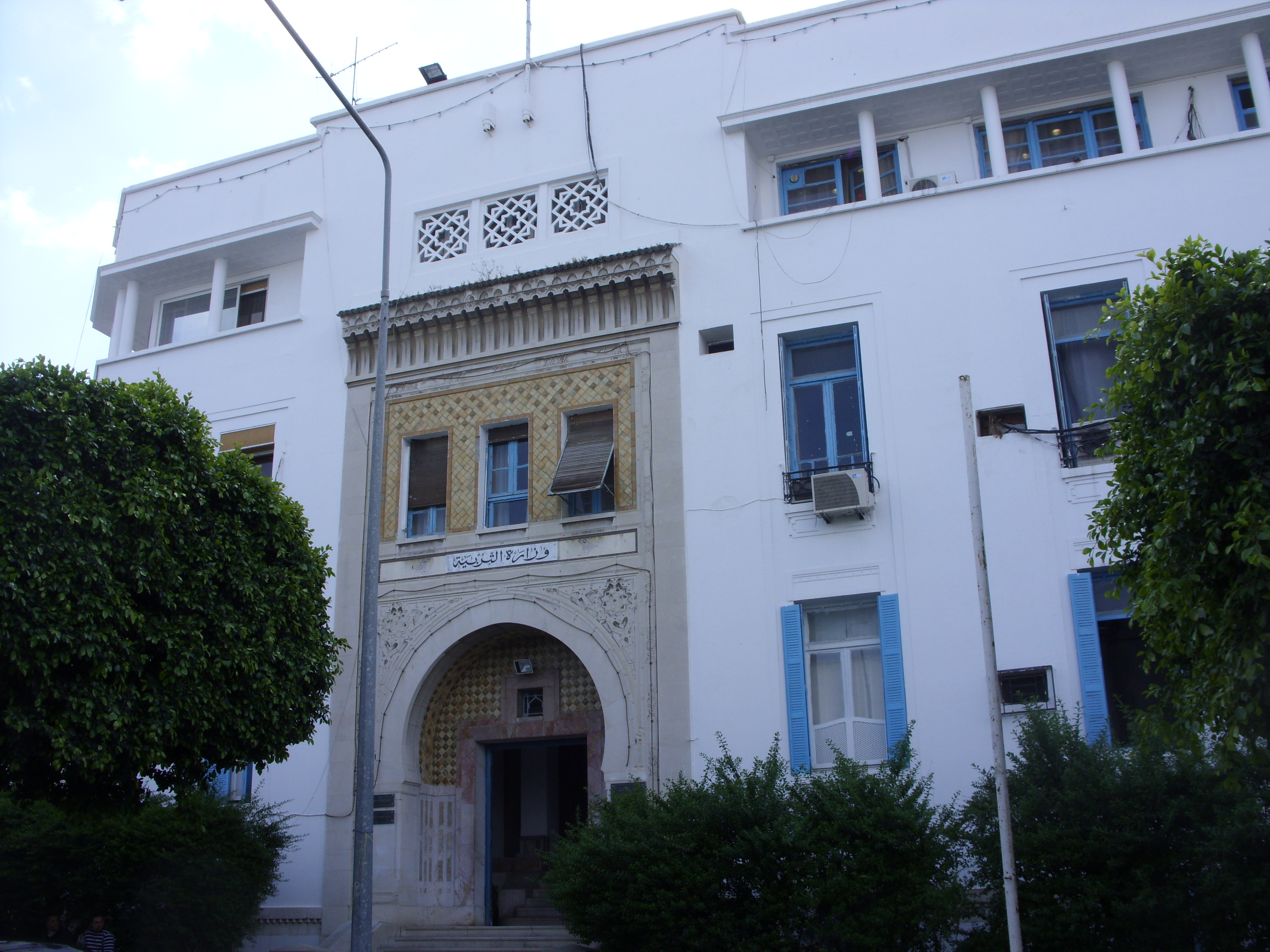
The Ministry of Education building

The Ministry of Education is responsible for the administration of education in Tunisia. It has its headquarters at Boulevard Bab Bnet 1030 in Tunis. As of 2015 it was directed by Néji Jalloul. In May 2017, the government fired Jalloul and replaced him with Slim Khalbous.

The Ministry is responsible for ensuring the right to education and training of all Tunisians according to law No. 2002-80 of 23 July 2002 on education. It pays special attention to children with special needs and those of Tunisian nationals abroad. The department facilitates public education and training systems and institutions and structures on a local, regional and national scale, and also overlooks private schools and preschooling.
