= 2026 in Tunisia =

- Decades: 2000s; 2010s; 2020s
- See also: History of Tunisia; List of years in Tunisia

Events in the year 2026 in Tunisia.

== Incumbents ==
- President: Kais Saied
- Prime Minister: Sara Zaafarani
- President of the Assembly of the Representatives by the People: Ibrahim Bouderbala
- Government: Zaafarani Cabinet

== Events ==
=== January ===
- 20 January – At least four people are killed in flooding in Monastir Governorate, the worst floods since 1950.
- 22 January – A court in Tunis sentences journalists Bohran Bssaies and Mourad Zghidi to 3.5 years imprisonment on charges of money laundering.
- 30 January – President Saied extends the national state of emergency by 11 months, through 31 December 2026.

=== February ===
- 15 February – Police detain opposition figure Olfa Hamdi, leader of the Third Republic party, upon her arrival at Tunis–Carthage International Airport, after calling for a transitional government, and early elections.
- 16 February – Five people are sentenced to up to 15 years' imprisonment on charges of involvement in the 2023 Djerba synagogue shooting.
- 27 February – Former prime minister Ali Laarayedh is jailed for 24 years for aiding the travel of Tunisian jihadists to Syria; seven others are also sentenced in the trial.

=== March ===
- 3 March – A court jails businessman Marouan Mabrouk for corruption, while former prime minister Youssef Chahed and several ex-cabinet members are sentenced in absentia to six years in prison and fined $800 million for their handling of Mabrouk’s case.
- 19 March – A court sentences migrant rights activist Saadia Mosbah to eight years in prison, on charges of money laundering and illicit enrichment.
- 31 March – A court sentences journalist Ghassen Ben Khelifa to two years in prison on charges of publishing fake news.

=== April ===
- 17 April – A court sentences comedian and actor Lotfi Abdelli in absentia to 18 months’ imprisonment on charges including insulting state officials and offending public morality.
- 24 April –
  - Journalist Zied Heni is detained by order of the public prosecutor, after publishing an article critical of the judiciary. He is sentenced to 1 year in prison on 7 May.
  - Authorities order a one-month suspension of the Tunisian Human Rights League, a civil society organization and member of the Tunisian National Dialogue Quartet.
- 28 April – President Saied dismisses Energy Minister Fatma Thabet amid controversy over planned renewable energy projects ahead of a parliamentary vote; Salah Zouari is appointed to temporarily oversee the ministry.

=== June ===
- 2 June – The Tunis Court of First Instance sentences Ennahda leader Rached Ghannouchi to life imprisonment on charges of terrorism.
- 9 June – A court sentences journalist Khaoula Boukrim to four years' imprisonment in absentia under Decree-Law 54, after she had fled to Paris in December 2025.
- 11 June–19 July – Tunisia participates at the 2026 FIFA World Cup.

=== July ===
- 17 July – President Kais Saied is admitted to a hospital for an emergency procedure after suffering a heart attack.
- 25 July – Amid deadly blackouts, protests erupt on the fifth anniversary of the 2021 Tunisian self-coup and continue for days afterward.
- 25 July – The town of Sidi Bou Saïd is designated as a UNESCO World Heritage Site.

=== September ===
- 21 September – At least 11 people are detained following a pro-Palestinian demonstration in Tunis.

=== October ===
- 17 October – Thousands of Tunisians participate in a protest against President Saied, making it the largest demonstration against him in years.

== Holidays ==
- 1 January – New Year's Day
- 20 March – Independence Day
- 20-21 March – Eid al-Fitr
- 1 April – Eid al-Fitr holiday
- 9 April – Martyrs' Day
- 1 May – Labour Day
- 27 May – Eid al-Adha
- 16 June – Islamic New Year
- 25 July – Republic Day
- 13 August – Women's Day
- 25 August – Mawlid
- 15 October – Evacuation Day
- 17 December – Revolution and Youth Day

== Deaths ==
- 19 February – Abderrazak Kéfi, 87, minister of transport (1987–1988).
- 7 March – Sadok Belaïd, 87, jurist and academic
- 19 April – Driss Guiga, 101, minister of the interior (1980–1984).
- 13 May – Khalifa Chater, 90, academic and historian

== Art and entertainment ==
- List of Tunisian submissions for the Academy Award for Best International Feature Film
