= 2027 in Tunisia =

- Decades: 2000s; 2010s; 2020s
- See also: History of Tunisia; List of years in Tunisia

Events in the year 2027 in Tunisia.

== Events ==
=== Planned or scheduled ===
- 2 August - Solar eclipse of August 2, 2027 (total eclipse)

== Holidays ==
- 1 January – New Year's Day
- 10-11 March – Eid al-Fitr
- 20 March – Independence Day
- 9 April – Martyrs' Day
- 1 May – Labour Day
- 16 May – Eid al-Adha
- 6 June – Islamic New Year
- 25 July – Republic Day
- 13 August – Women's Day
- 14 August – Mawlid
- 15 October – Evacuation Day
- 17 December – Revolution and Youth Day
