= 2020 in Tunisia =

- Decades: 2000s; 2010s; 2020s
- See also: History of Tunisia; List of years in Tunisia

Events in the year 2020 in Tunisia.

== Incumbents ==
- President: Kais Saied
- Prime Minister
  - Youssef Chahed (until February 27, 2020)
  - Elyes Fakhfakh (February 27, 2020 – September 2, 2020)
  - Hichem Mechichi (since September 2, 2020)
- President of the Assembly of the Representatives by the People: Rached Ghannouchi

== Events ==
- January 14 – Revolution and Youth Day (2011)
- February 3 – President Kais Saied visits Algeria in his first trip outside the country.
- February 9 – 1,200 runners participate in a half-Marathon (21 kilometers) in Djerba, Tunisia.
- February 17 – President Kais Saied says he will call early elections if a parliamentary stalemate is not resolved by February 21. He calls this the worst political crisis since 1956.
- March 6 – Suicide bombing outside U.S. Embassy in Tunis
- March 20 – Independence Day (1956 from France)
- July 15 – Prime Minister Elyes Fakhfakh resigns over an alleged conflict of interest.
- July 25 - Hichem Mechichi, the Minister of the Interior is chosen as Prime Minister.

== Sports ==
- January 16 – January 26: 2020 African Men's Handball Championship: Egypt won their seventh title by defeating Tunisia 27–23 in the final.
- February 9 – 1,200 runners participate in half-Marathon (21 kilometers) in Djerba, Tunisia.

== Deaths ==
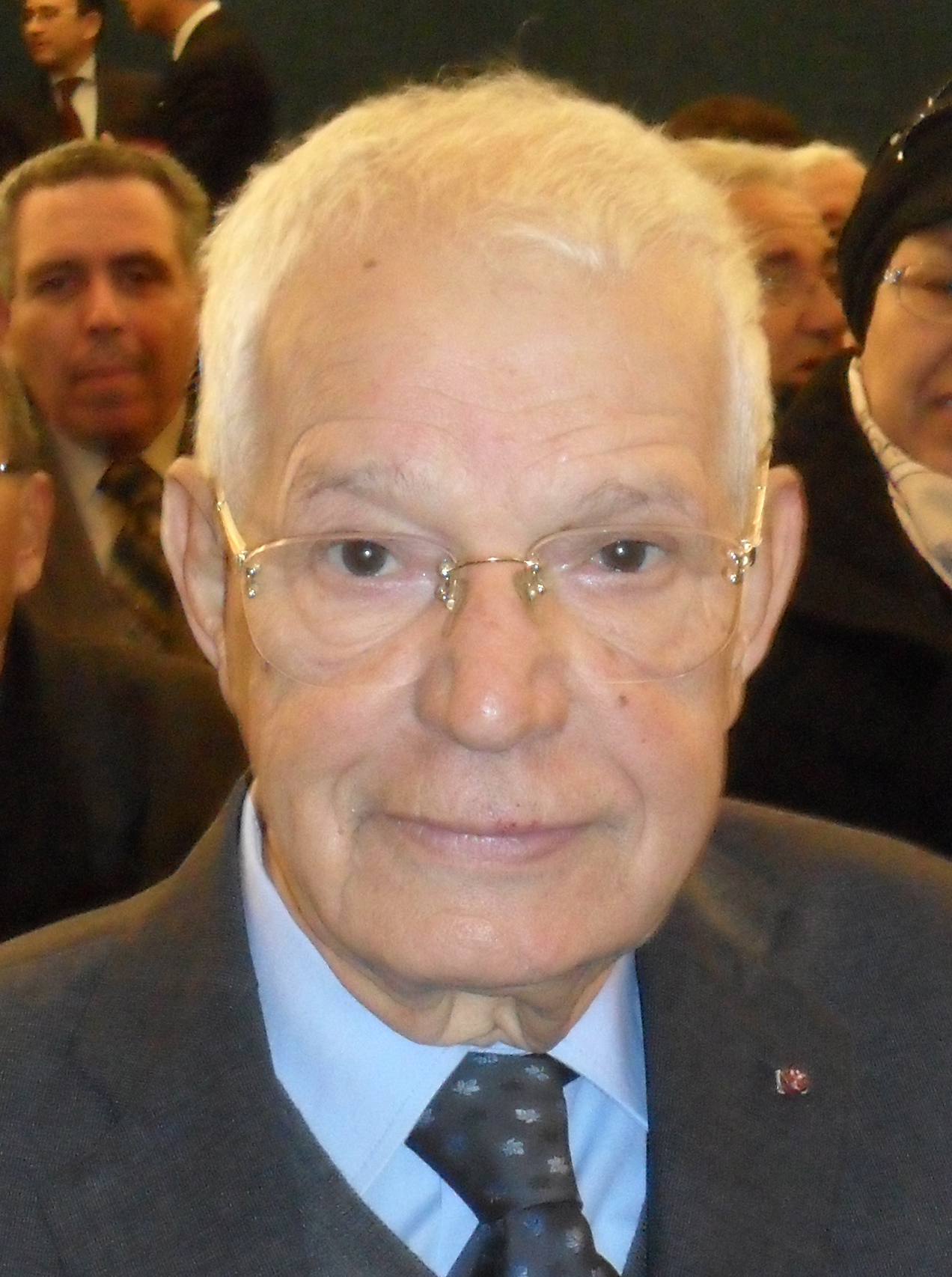
Hédi Baccouche

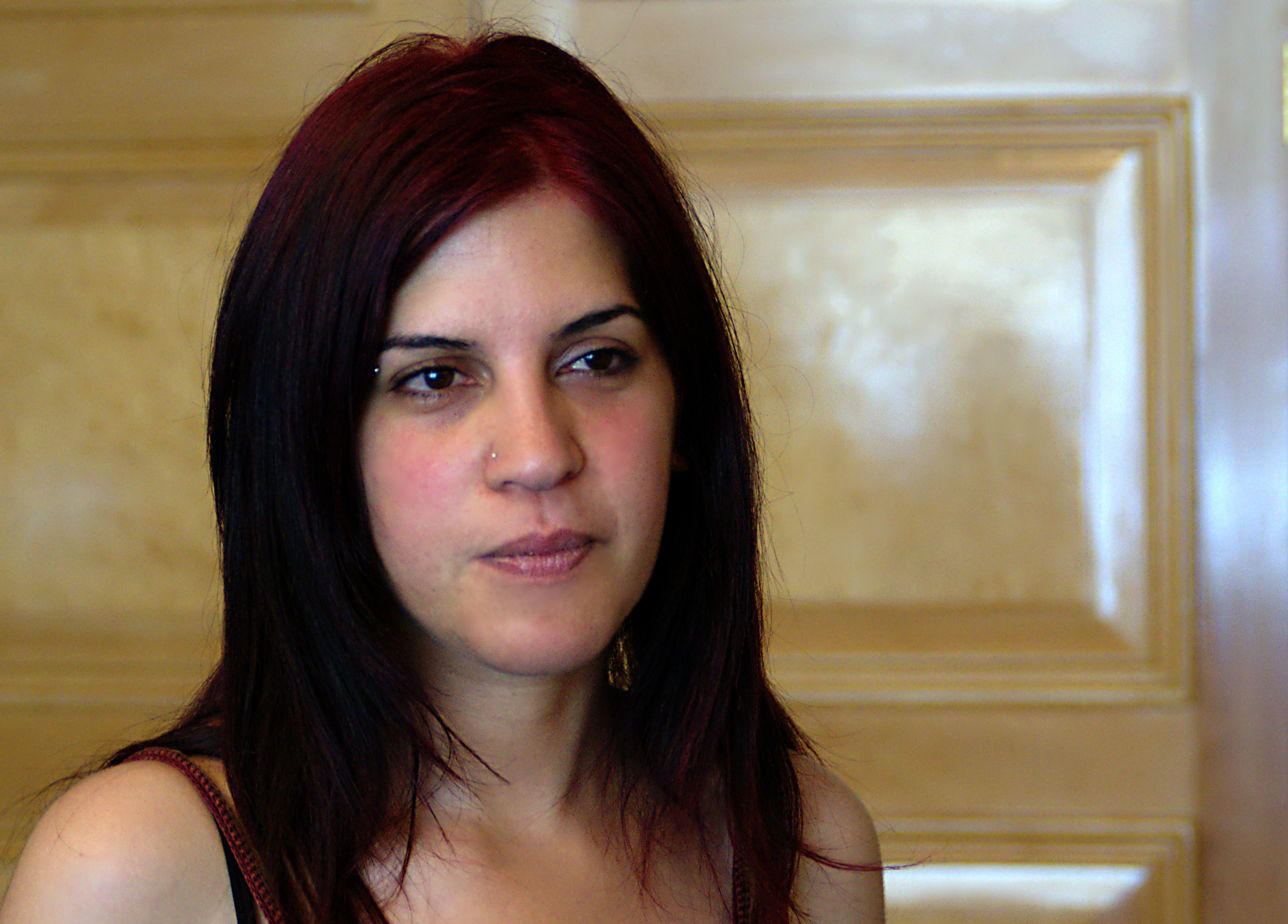
Lina Ben Mhenni

=== January to April ===
- January 7 – Abderrazak Rassaa, politician (b. 1930)
- January 21 – Hédi Baccouche, politician (b. 1930)
- January 27 – Lina Ben Mhenni, 36, political activist and blogger (b. 1983).
- February 10 – Saïd Amara, 75, handball player and coach (Espérance Sportive de Tunis, National Team)
- March 6 – Lieutenant Taoufik Mohammed El Nissaoui, 52, police officer killed during terrorist attack
- March 27 – Hamed Karoui, 92, politician, Prime Minister (1989–1999) and Minister of Justice (1988–1989)
- April 4 – Leïla Menchari, 93, decorator and designer, COVID-19
- April 20 – Noureddine Diwa, 83, footballer (Stade Tunisien, Limoges, national team)

=== May to August ===
- May 13 – Chedli Klibi, 94, politician, Minister of Culture (1961–1970, 1971–1973, 1976–1978) and Secretary-General of the Arab League (1979–1990).
- July 8 – Abdelmajid Tlemçani, 82–83, footballer (Espérance Sportive de Tunis, national team).
- July 27 – Radhi Jazi, 92, Tunisian pharmacist.
- July 28 – Gisèle Halimi, 93, Tunisian-French lawyer and feminist.
- August 11 – Salah Chaoua, 73, footballer (Club Africain, Al-Madina SC, National Team).
- August 17 – Ali Chaouch, 72, politician, Minister of the Interior (1997–1999).
- August 21
  - Mohamed Ben Rehaiem, 69, footballer (Sfaxien, Al-Nassr, national team).
  - Mohamed Gueddiche, 78, cardiologist, presidential doctor.

=== September to December ===
- 16 September – Ahmed Ben Salah, 94, politician, Minister of Finance (1961–1969).
- 7 October – Nabil Bechaouch, 49–50, footballer (Olympique Béja, national team).
- 14 October – Éric Assous, 64, Tunisian-born French film director, screenwriter (The Banned Woman, The Girl from Paris, 22 Bullets) and dramatist.
- 18 October – Naâma, 84, singer.
- 23 October – Abderrahmane Rahmouni, 75, footballer (Club Africain).
- 18 December – Yazid Zerhouni, 83, Tunisian-born Algerian politician.
- 24 December – At least twenty migrants drown when their boat capsizes near Sfax.
- 26 December – Gilbert Naccache, 81, writer and far-left militant.
- 27 December – Zouheïra Salem, 80, singer.

== See also ==
- 2020 in North Africa
- COVID-19 pandemic in Africa
- COVID-19 pandemic in Tunisia
- 2020s
- African Union
- Arab League
- List of terrorist incidents in Tunisia
