= 2025 in Tunisia =

- Decades: 2000s; 2010s; 2020s
- See also: History of Tunisia; List of years in Tunisia

Events in the year 2025 in Tunisia.

== Incumbents ==
- President: Kais Saied
- Prime Minister: Kamel Madouri (until 20 March); Sara Zaafarani (since 20 March)
- President of the Assembly of the Representatives by the People: Ibrahim Bouderbala
- Government: Madouri Cabinet

== Events ==
=== January ===
- 1 January – Two boats carrying migrants sink off the coast of Sfax, killing 27 passengers.
- 24 January – A man sets himself on fire outside the Grand Synagogue of Tunis before being shot dead by police. Two people, including a police officer, are injured from the flames.

=== February ===
- 3 February – A magnitude 4.7 earthquake hits Meknassy, injuring three people.

=== March ===
- 20 March – President Saied dismisses Kamel Madouri as prime minister and replaces him with equipment and housing minister Sara Zaafarani.

=== April ===
- 14 April – A wall collapses at a school in Mezzouna, killing three students.
- 19 April – Forty political opposition figures are convicted and sentenced to up to 66 years' imprisonment on charges including plotting against the state and terrorism.

=== May ===
- 3 May – Former prime minister Ali Larayedh is sentenced to 34 years' imprisonment on charges of facilitating travel by jihadists to Syria.
- 8 May – A Jewish resident is injured in an axe attack in Djerba.

=== June ===
- 12 June – Opposition politician Abir Moussi is sentenced to two years' imprisonment for criticising the legislative electoral process.
- 20 June – Former president Moncef Marzouki is sentenced in absentia by the Tunis Court of First Instance to 22 years' imprisonment on terrorism charges.

=== July ===
- 8 July – Ennahda leader Rached Ghannouchi is sentenced to 14 years' imprisonment on terrorism charges.

=== September ===
- 6 September – The Voice of Hind Rajab, a documentary film about the Gaza War directed by Tunisian filmmaker Kaouther Ben Hania, wins the Grand Jury Prize at the 82nd Venice International Film Festival in Italy.
- 7 September – Tunisia qualifies for the 2026 FIFA World Cup after defeating Namibia 1–0 at the 2026 FIFA World Cup qualification in Equatorial Guinea.
- 9–10 September – The Global Sumud Flotilla says two of its vessels had been struck by drones while was sailing in the Sidi Bou Said area on its way to deliver humanitarian aid to the Gaza Strip.

=== October ===
- 3 October – A Tunisian court sentences Saber Chouchane to death for Facebook posts criticising President Saied. Following widespread public and human rights criticism, the court releases him four days later.
- 11 October – Protests in Gabès demand closure of the Compagnie des phosphates de Gafsa plant over pollution, leading to clashes with police and government intervention. More than 120 people are subsequently hospitalized after experiencing breathing problems blamed on the plant.
- 21 October – A general strike is held in Gabès as part of protests against the Compagnie des phosphates de Gafsa plant.
- 22 October – At least 40 migrants from sub-Saharan Africa die after a boat sinks off the coast near Mahdia.
- 27 October – The government suspends the Tunisian Forum for Economic and Social Rights for one month over foreign funding audits.

=== November ===
- 8 November – Rached Ghannouchi, imprisoned leader of the opposition Ennahda party, begins a hunger strike in protest of what he calls unjust detention and politically motivated trials under President Saied.
- 19 November – Demonstrations take place near Parliament; thousands of doctors go on strike protesting low pay, outdated equipment, and shortages of medical supplies.
- 26 November – President Saied summons European Union ambassador Giuseppe Perrone for meeting with leaders of the Tunisian General Labour Union and the Tunisian Confederation of Industry, Trade and Handicrafts.
- 29 November – Police arrest opposition figure Chaima Issa during a protest in Tunis to enforce a 20-year sentence handed down the previous day.

=== December ===
- 2 December – Police arrest opposition figure Ayachi Hammami at his home to enforce a five-year prison sentence for conspiracy against state security.
- 4 December – Police arrest opposition figure Ahmed Najib Chebbi at his home to enforce a 12-year prison sentence for conspiracy against state security.
- 13 December –
  - Free Destourian Party leader Abir Moussi is sentenced to 12 years' imprisonment on charges of assault intended to cause chaos.
  - Opposition parties, activists, and civil society groups hold a unified protest in Tunis against President Saied.
- 23 December – Nourredine Taboubi resigns as head of the Tunisian General Labour Union, citing tensions between the union and President Saied's government over political repression and labour demands.

== Holidays ==
- January 1 – New Year's Day
- March 20 – Independence Day
- March 30–31 – Eid al-Fitr
- April 1 – Eid al-Fitr holiday
- April 9 – Martyrs' Day
- May 1 – Labour Day
- June 6 – Eid al-Adha
- June 26 – Islamic New Year
- July 25 – Republic Day
- August 13 – Women's Day
- September 4 – Mawlid
- October 15 – Evacuation Day
- December 17 – Revolution Day

== Deaths ==
- 23 April – Fouad Mebazaa, 91, speaker of the Chamber of Deputies (1997–2011) and acting president (2011)
- 23 September – Claudia Cardinale, 87, Tunisian-born Italian actress (Once Upon a Time in the West, The Leopard, 8½)

== Art and entertainment ==
- List of Tunisian submissions for the Academy Award for Best International Feature Film
