= 2024 in Tunisia =

- Decades: 2000s; 2010s; 2020s
- See also: History of Tunisia; List of years in Tunisia

Events in the year 2024 in Tunisia.

== Incumbents ==
- President: Kais Saied
- Prime Minister: Ahmed Hachani (until 7 August); Kamel Madouri (7 August onwards)
- President of the Assembly of the Representatives by the People: Ibrahim Bouderbala
- Government: Hachani Cabinet, Madouri Cabinet

== Events ==
=== March ===
- 27 March – A court in Tunis sentences four people to death and two others to life in prison for the 2013 murder of politician Chokri Belaid.

=== May ===
- 10 May – The 2024 African Trampoline Championships are held in Bizerte
- 14 May – Police raid the headquarters of the Tunisian Order of Lawyers and arrest Mahdi Zagrouba, known for his opposition to President Kais Saied, following the arrest of lawyer Sonia Dahmani and two journalists on 12 May.
- 25 May – President Saied replaces interior minister Kamel Feki and social affairs minister Malek Zahi with Khaled Nouri and Kamel Madouri respectively in a cabinet reshuffle.

=== June ===
- 21 June – President Saied dismisses Minister of Religious Affairs Ibrahim Chaibi after 49 Tunisians were reported to have died so far in this year’s Hajj pilgrimage in Mecca.
- 26 June – Unidentified attackers open fire on a military patrol in Remada, near the Libyan border, killing a soldier.

=== July ===
- 4 July – Opposition leader and founder of the Republican People's Union party Lotfi Mraïhi is arrested on suspicion of money laundering.
- 19 July:
  - A court sentences Lotfi Mraïhi, a potential presidential candidate, to eight months in prison on a charge of vote buying, and also bans Mraïhi from running in presidential elections.
  - President Saied announces his candidacy for a second term.

=== August ===
- 6 August – A court sentences opposition leader Abir Moussi to two years in prison for insulting the Independent High Authority for Elections. The court also sentences four potential presidential candidates, including activist Nizar Chaari, to eight months in prison and bans them from running for office on charges of vote buying.
- 7 August – President Saied dismisses prime minister Ahmed Hachani and replaces him with social affairs minister Kamel Madouri.
- 9 August – Firas Katoussi wins a gold medal in Taekwondo at the 2024 Summer Olympics, becoming Tunisia's first Olympic champion in Taekwondo.
- 25 August – President Saied replaces 19 ministers and three state secretaries as part of a cabinet reshuffle.

=== September ===
- 2 September – The High Independent Authority for Elections (ISIE) confirms President Saied, Zouhair Maghzaoui and Ayachi Zammel as the only candidates in the October presidential election, despite orders by the Administrative Court to reinstate disqualified candidates Abdellatif Mekki, Mondher Znaidi and Imed Daimi.
- 14 September – Police arrest more than 80 members of the opposition Ennahda Movement amid protests against President Saied in Tunis.
- 25 September – The bodies of 13 migrants are found washed up near Mahdia.
- 27 September – The Assembly of the Representatives of the People votes to amend the country's election law by preventing the judiciary from interfering with decisions of the ISIE.
- 30 September – A boat carrying migrants capsizes off the coast of Djerba, killing at least 12 people. Twenty-nine people are rescued, while ten others are reported missing.

=== October ===
- 6 October – 2024 Tunisian presidential election: President Saied is elected to a second term in office after winning 90.7% of the vote amid a boycott by opposition figures and a turnout of 28.8%.
- 21 October – Kais Saied is inaugurated for a second term as president.
- 28 October – The bodies of 16 migrants are found off the coast of Mahdia.

=== December ===
- 12 December – A boat carrying migrants sinks off the coast of Chebba, killing at least nine passengers and leaving six others missing.
- 18 December – A boat carrying migrants sinks off the coast of Sfax, killing 20 passengers.
- 30 December – The United States announces the repatriation of Guantanamo Bay detainee Ridah Bin Saleh al-Yazidi to Tunisia.

== Holidays ==
- January 1 – New Year's Day
- March 20 – Independence Day
- April 9 – Martyrs' Day
- April 12 – Eid al-Fitr
- May 1 – Labour Day
- June 16 – Eid al-Adha
- 7 July – Islamic New Year
- July 25 – Republic Day
- August 13 – Women's Day
- September 15 – Milad un-Nabi
- October 15 – Evacuation Day
- December 17 – Revolution Day

== Art and entertainment ==
- List of Tunisian submissions for the Academy Award for Best International Feature Film

== Deaths ==
- 1 January – Khemais Chammari, 81, diplomat, human rights activist, and politician, deputy (1994–1996).
- 18 January – Mohamed Ghozzi, 74, poet and literary critic.
- 9 July – Hédi M'henni, 81, politician, minister of the interior (2002–2004) and defence (2004–2005).
