= 2021 in Tunisia =

- Decades: 2000s; 2010s; 2020s
- See also: History of Tunisia; List of years in Tunisia

Events in the year 2021 in Tunisia.

== Incumbents ==
- President: Kais Saied
- Prime Minister: Hichem Mechichi, Najla Bouden
- President of the Assembly of the Representatives by the People: Rached Ghannouchi
- Government: Mechichi Cabinet, Bouden Cabinet

=== Cabinet ===
This is an incomplete list of the Cabinet announced January 16, 2021.

- Ministry of the Interior: Walid Dhabi :-Mechichi on Saturday named Walid Dhabi as the new interior minister replacing Taoufik Charfeddine, who is seen as close to President Kais said.
- Ministry of Health: Hedi Khairi:-Hedi Khairi was named health minister following criticism over the government's handling of the coronavirus pandemic, with the official date .
- Ministry of Justice: Youssef Zouaghi:-Mechichi appointed Youssef Zouaghi as justice minister, Sofien Ben Touns as energy minister and Oussama Kheriji as agriculture minister.
- Ministry of Industry, Energy and Mines: Sofien Ben Touns:-Coordinating ministry. Ministry of Regional Development and Planning. Team Members. Rached Ben Saleh. Team Leader, Director, MDRP. Sofiene Gaaloul.
- Ministry of Agriculture: Oussama Kheriji:-Osama Kheriji has just been introduced for the post of Minister of Agriculture, Water Resources and Fisheries during the reshuffle announced
- Ministry of the Environment (Tunisia): Chiheb Ben Ahmed:-Humoral and Cellular Immunogenicity of Six Different Vaccines against SARS-CoV-2 in Adults: A Comparative Study in Tunisia (North Africa). by. Melika Ben Ahmed.
- Ministry of Culture (Tunisia): Youssef bin Ibrahim:-Tunisia, officially the Republic of Tunisia, is the northernmost country in Africa. ... Today, Tunisia's culture and identity are rooted in this centuries-long

== Events ==
Ongoing — COVID-19 pandemic in Tunisia

=== January to April ===
- January 16 – Prime Minister Hichem Mechichi appoints 12 new ministers.
- January 17 – 2021 Tunisian protests: Thousands take to the streets of Tunis and Sousse as protests turn violent in response to economic hardship on the 10th anniversary of the Arab Spring. Protesters shut down oil production in Tataouine.
- January 20 – Young people clash with police for the fifth straight night. “Your voice is heard, and your anger is legitimate, and it is my role and the role of the government to work to realize your demands and to make the dream of Tunisia to become true,” Prime Minister Mechichi said in a fruitless attempt to calm things down.
- February 6 – Hundreds of protesters backed by the million-member UGTT union defy government orders to rally in Tunis on the eighth anniversary of the assassination of Chokri Belaid.
- February 12 – At least 41 dead bodies were found, after a migrant boat had sunk on the shores of Tunisia
- March 9 – At least 39 migrants from sub-Saharan Africa drowned when their boat capsizes off the Tunisian coast; 165 are rescued.
- April 2 – A female suicide bomber kills herself and her baby during counter-terrorism operations in Kasserine Governorate. Two other Islamic extremists were killed in a separate operation.

=== May to August ===
- July 25 – 2021 Tunisian political crisis

=== October ===
- October 11 – Najla Bouden becomes Prime Minister of Tunisia, making her the first female prime minister both in Tunisia and the Arab world.

== Sports ==
Football

In December 18th 2021, Tunisia lost the 2021 FIFA Arab Cup to Algeria, the result of the match ended 2-0 for Algeria.

Summer Olympics

Eighteen-year-old swimmer Hafnaoui defied expectations on July 25, stunning the global audience as he surpassed the 400m freestyle frontrunners, Jack McLoughlin of Australia and Kieran Smith of the US. In an unexpected turn of events, he secured his nation's inaugural gold medal at the 2020 Olympics.

== Deaths ==
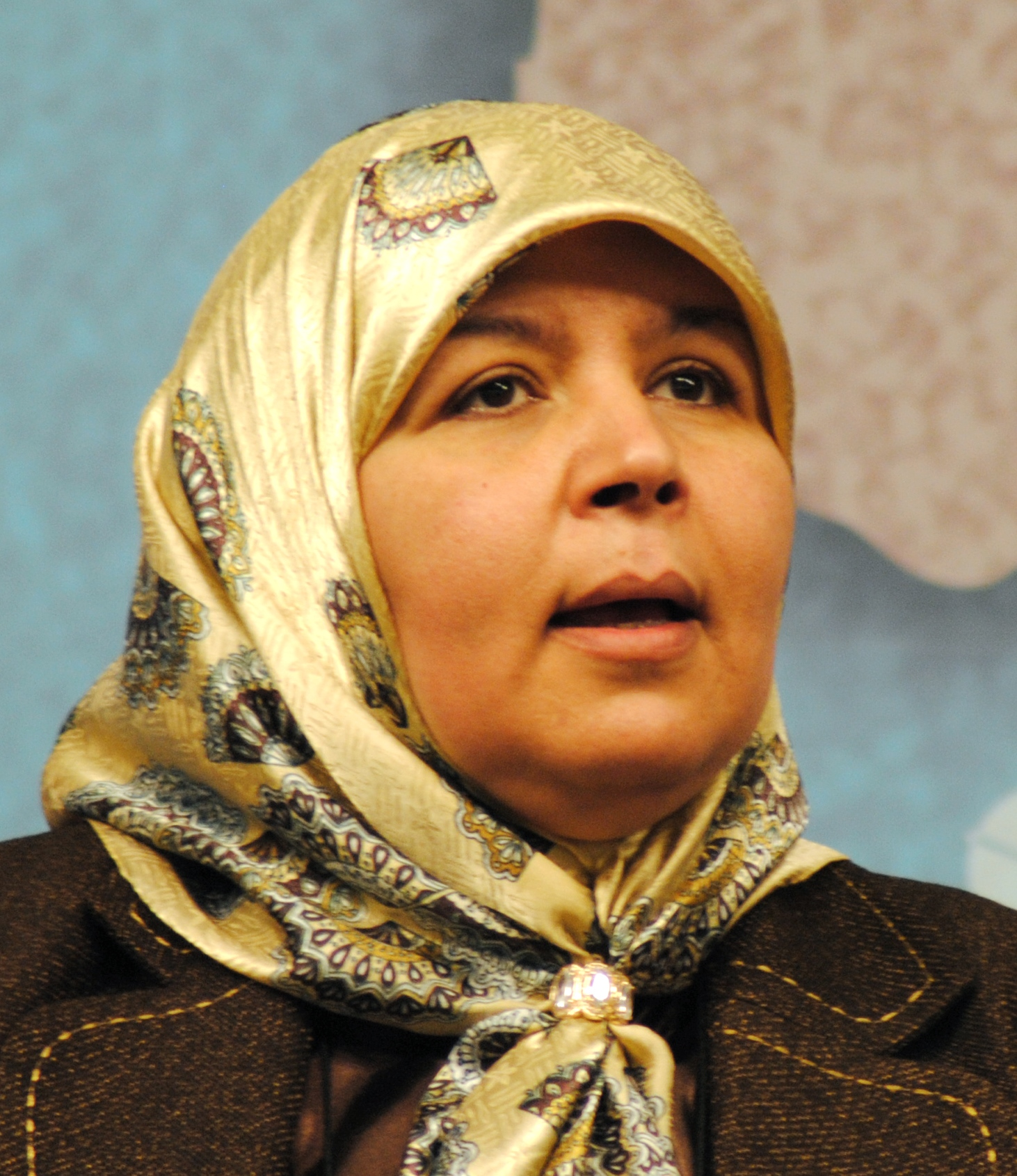
Meherzia Labidi Maïza

- 5 January – Moncer Rouissi, politician (b. 1940).
- 22 January – Meherzia Labidi Maïza, 57, politician and translator, member of the Constituent Assembly (2011–2014) and Deputy (since 2014), COVID-19.
- 28 January – Chedly Ayari, 87, economist and politician, President of the Central Bank of Tunisia (2012–2018), Minister of Finance (1972–1974) and Education (1970–1971), COVID-19.
- 29 January – Ahmed Achour, 75, composer and conductor.
- 3 February – Abdelkader Jerbi, film director.
- 6 February – Abdellatif Ben Ammar, 79, Tunisian film maker and producer
- 7 February – Moufida Tlatli, 73, film director (The Silences of the Palace, The Season of Men), Minister of Culture (2011).
- 26 March – Saâdeddine Zmerli, 91, urologist and politician.
