= 2016 in Tunisia =

- Decades: 1990s; 2000s; 2010s; 2020s
- See also: History of Tunisia; List of years in Tunisia

The following lists events that happened during 2016 in the Republic of Tunisia.

== Events ==
=== January ===
- 2016 Tunisian protests: Protests erupted in the Kasserine region of Tunisia over unemployment, which later spread to other parts of the country.

=== March ===
- 7 March – Battle of Ben Guerdane
- 20 March – The Machrouu Tounes political party is founded.

=== April ===
- 9 April – The Democratic Party is founded.

=== August ===
- 27 August – The Chahed Cabinet led by Prime Minister Youssef Chahed is formed.

=== December ===
- 28 December – 2016 Djebel Jelloud train accident: Five people are killed when a bus and a train collide.

== Sports ==
- The 2016 Tunisian Athletics Championships were held from 15 to 17 July in Radès, Tunisia.
- Tunisia competed at the 2016 Summer Olympics held in Rio de Janeiro, Brazil from 5 to 21 August 2016.
- Tunisia competed at the 2016 Summer Paralympics held in Rio de Janeiro, Brazil from 7 to 18 September 2016.
