= Evacuation Day =

Evacuation Day may refer to:

- Evacuation Day (Massachusetts), the anniversary of departure of British army on March 17, 1776, celebrated in Greater Boston since 1901
- Evacuation Day (New York), the anniversary of departure of British army on November 25, 1783, celebrated annually until World War I
- Evacuation Day (Quebec), the anniversary of departure of British army on November 11, 1871, shortly after The Great Chicago Fire
- Evacuation Day (Syria), the anniversary of departure of French army on April 17, 1946
- Evacuation Day (Tunisia), the anniversary of departure of French army on October 15, 1963
