= 2023 in Tunisia =

- Decades: 2000s; 2010s; 2020s
- See also: History of Tunisia; List of years in Tunisia

Events in the year 2023 in Tunisia.

== Incumbents ==
- President: Kais Saied
- Prime Minister:
  - Najla Bouden (until August 2, 2023)
  - Ahmed Hachani (from August 2, 2023)
- President of the Assembly of the Representatives by the People: Ibrahim Bouderbala
- Government:
  - Bouden Cabinet (until August 2, 2023)
  - Hachani Cabinet (from August 2, 2023)

== Events ==
- 6 January - Fadhila Rebhi is sacked as Minister of Trade and Export Development.
- 7 January - Five people are killed and ten others are missing after a boat carrying migrants sinks off the coast of Tunisia.
- 29 January - Second round of the Tunisian parliamentary election: Tunisians elect the members of the third Assembly of the Representatives of the People in a run-off. The electoral board reports a voter turnout of 11.3 percent as most opposition parties boycott the election.
- 21 February - Kais Saied's hate speech against Black African migrants.
- 9 March - Fourteen people are killed and 54 others are rescued after a boat carrying migrants sinks off the coast of Tunisia.
- 23 March - 2023 Tunisia migrant boat disaster: Five people are killed when migrant boats sink off the coast of Sfax.
- 26 March - At least 29 sub-Saharan Africans are killed when two boats sink off the coast.
- 2 August - Tunisian President Kais Saied appoints Ahmed Hachani as prime minister after dismissing Najla Bouden, the first female prime minister in the Arab world, from the role.
- 9 August - 2023 Tunisia migrant boat disasters: Forty-one people are killed when a boat carrying 45 migrants from Sfax, Tunisia, capsizes and sinks in the Mediterranean Sea off the coast of Lampedusa, Italy.
- 14 August - Five people are killed and seven others missing after a boat carrying 35 migrants from Sfax, sinks in the Mediterranean Sea.
- 17 October - Kaïs Saïed asked Minister of Finance Sihem Boughdiri to assume the portfolio of interim Minister of Economy and Planning following the dismissal of Samir Saïed from the position.
- 16 December - Three people are killed and two others injured when a wall of the Gate of Floggers collapses while it is being renovated in Kairouan.

== Sports ==
- 2022–23 Tunisian Ligue Professionnelle 1
- 2022–23 Espérance Sportive de Tunis season
