= 2019 in Tunisia =

- Decades: 1990s; 2000s; 2010s; 2020s
- See also: History of Tunisia; List of years in Tunisia

Events in the year 2019 in Tunisia.

== Incumbents ==
- President: Kais Saied
- Prime Minister: Youssef Chahed
- President of the Assembly of the Representatives by the People: Rached Ghannouchi

== Events ==
=== June ===
- June 27 – Suicide Bombing in Tunis, Tunisia

=== July ===
- July 5 – Tunisia bans the burqa.

=== September ===
- September 15 – The first round of the 2019 Tunisian presidential election is held

=== October ===
- October 6 – The 2019 Tunisian parliamentary election are held and Ennahdha Movement wins with 52 seats in the Assembly of the Representatives of the People
- October 13 – The second round of the 2019 Tunisian presidential election is held and Kais Saied wins
- October 21 – Former Professor Kais Saied becomes President of Tunisia

== Deaths ==
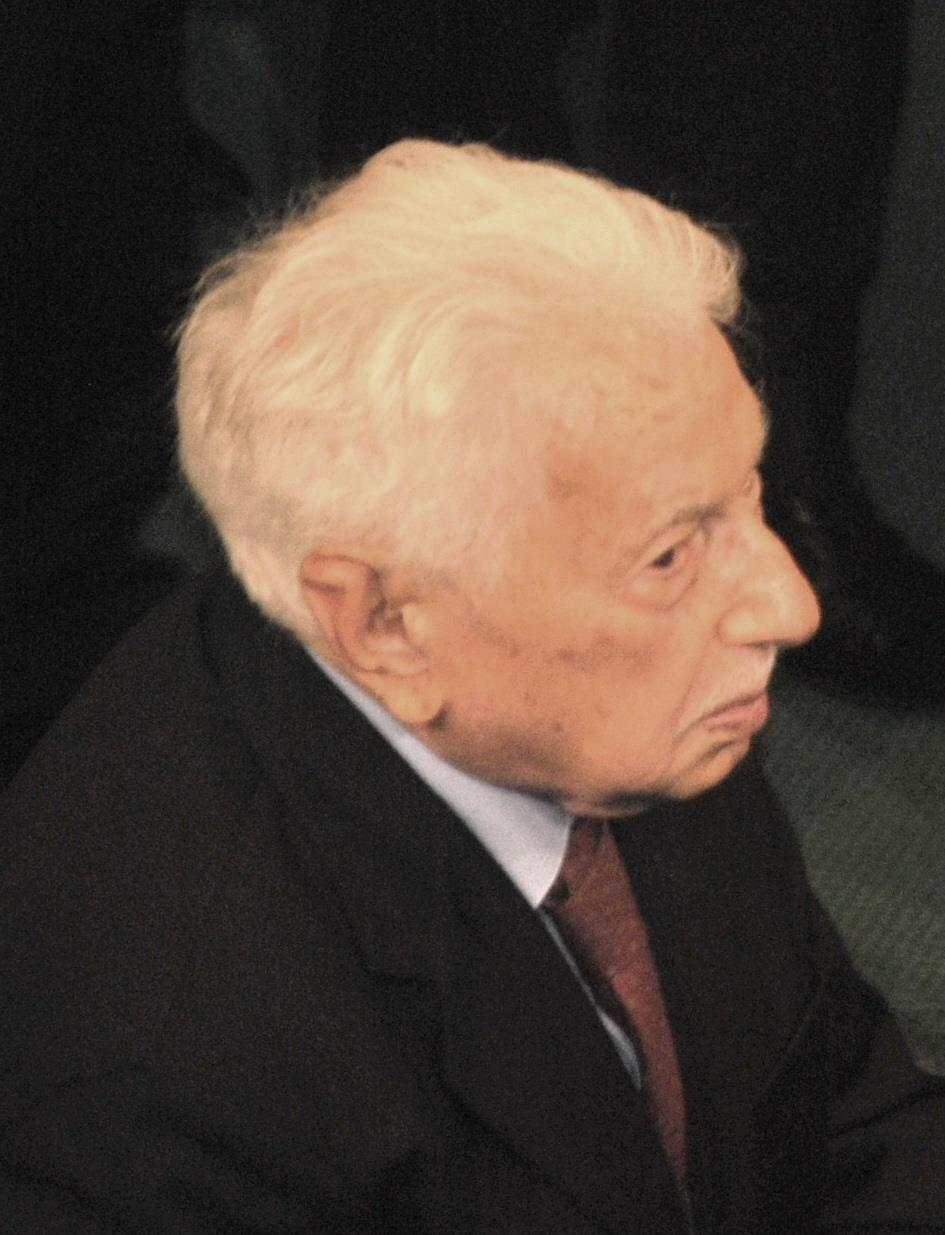
Mustapha Filali

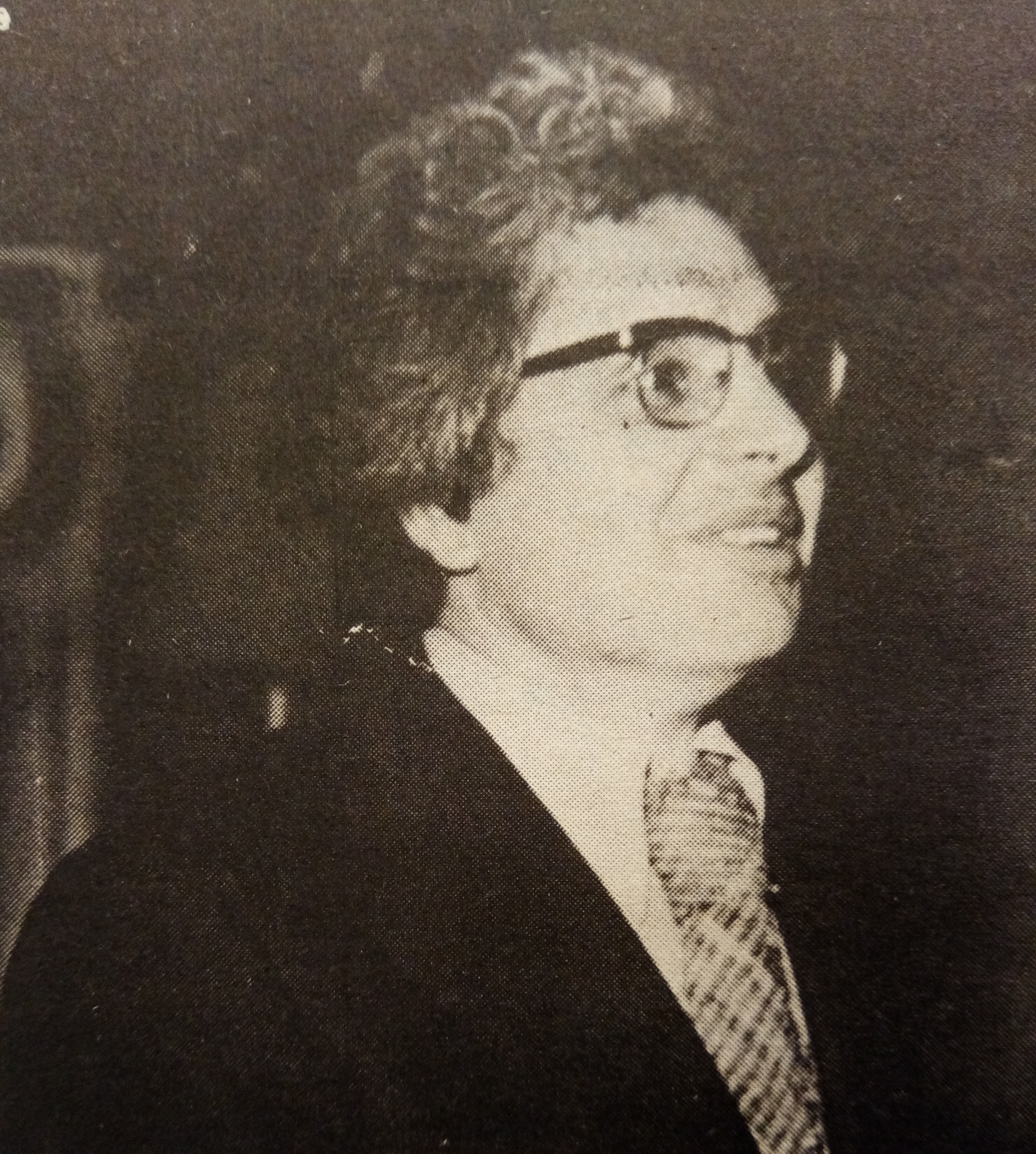
Hedi Turki

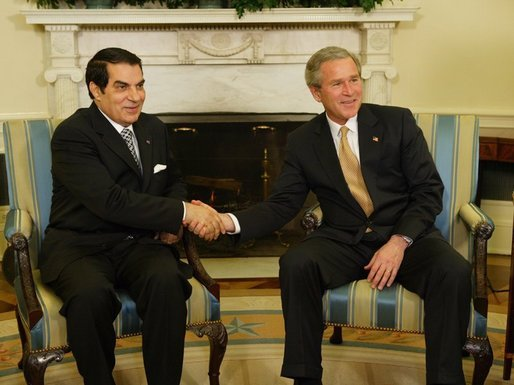
Meeting between Ben Ali and U.S. President George W. Bush, in 2004, at the White House

- 20 January – Mustapha Filali, politician (b. 1921).
- 31 March – Hedi Turki, painter (b. 1922).
- 25 July – Beji Caid Essebsi incumbent president Sebsi.
- 15 September – Chadlia Caid Essebsi (b. 1936), 83, Tunisian consort, First Lady (2014–2019), heart attack.
- 19 September – Zine El Abidine Ben Ali, 14th Prime Minister and 2nd President of Tunisia (b. 1936)
