= 2012 in Tunisia =

- Decades: 1990s; 2000s; 2010s; 2020s
- See also: History of Tunisia; List of years in Tunisia

The following lists events that happened during 2012 in the Tunisian Republic.

== Events ==
=== March ===
- 28 March: Ghazi Beji and Jabeur Mejri are sentenced to imprisonment for "transgressing morality, defamation and disrupting public order" after posting naked caricatures of Muhammad to Facebook.

== Sports ==
- Tunisia competed at the 2012 Summer Olympics in London, United Kingdom.
- Tunisia competed at the 2012 Summer Paralympics in London, United Kingdom.
