= Filali =

Filali (Arabic: فيلالي) or El-Filali (Arabic: الفيلالي) is an Arabic surname that denotes a relationship to or from the Tafilalt, Morocco. Notable people with the surname include:

- Abdellatif Filali (1928–2009), Moroccan politician
- Amina El Filali (1996–2012), 16-year-old girl from Larache, Morocco
- Azza Filali (born 1952), Tunisian gastroenterologist
- Mehdi Filali, French karateka
- Mohammed El Filali, Moroccan football forward
- Mustapha Filali (1921–2019), Tunisian politician
- Tayeb Filali (born 1979), Algerian long-distance runner
