= Kefi =

Kefi or Kéfi is a surname. Notable people with this name include:

- Abderrazak Kéfi (1938–2026), Tunisian politician
- Fadhel Abd Kefi, Tunisian politician
- Faïza Kefi, Tunisian jurist and politician
- Frangcyatma Alves Ima Kefi (born 1997), football player from East Timor
- Kacem Kefi (1945–2018), Tunisian singer and composer
- Mouldi Kefi (born 1946), Tunisian politician
- Naïma Kefi (1944 or 1945–2025), first lady of Tunisia
- Sonia Kéfi, network scientist and ecologist
