= Moncef Ouannes =

Tunisian sociologist (1956–2020)

- Born: 1956
- Died: 4 November 2020 (aged 63–64); Tunis, Tunisia
- Occupation: Sociologist

Moncef Ouannes (Arabic: المنصف وناس; 1956 – 4 November 2020) was a Tunisian sociologist.

== Biography ==
After studying classical history, Ouannes earned a doctorate in sociology at the Faculty of Human and Social Sciences of Tunis. He would become head of the sociology department at his alma mater before teaching sociology at Tunis University for many years.

Ouannes served as Director General of the Center for Economic and Social Studies and Research and served on the committee of many scientific journals. He also served on several international commissions and was a guest lecturer at various Arab universities. A professor emeritus of sociology at Tunis University, he was a corresponding member of the Tunisian Academy of Sciences, Letters, and Arts and a member of the Higher Authority for Realisation of the Objectives of the Revolution, Political Reform and Democratic Transition. His research primarily focused on development in the countries of Maghreb.

Moncef Ouannes died from COVID-19 in Tunis on 4 November 2020.

== Honours ==
- Knight of the Order of the Republic of Tunisia
- Officer of the National Order of Merit of Tunisia

== Main publications ==
- Le phénomène associatif au Maghreb : histoire, processus d'évolution et perspectives (1997)
- Islam, élites, modernisation et société dans la Libye contemporaine : approche socio-anthropologique (2001)
- Militaires, élites et modernisation dans la Libye contemporaine (2009)
- Une histoire méconnue, les relations libyo-françaises au Fezzan de 1943 à 1956 : regards croisés, Libye, France, Tunisie (2012)
- Révolte et reconstruction en Libye : le roi et le rebelle (2014)
