= 2015 in Tunisia =

- Decades: 1990s; 2000s; 2010s; 2020s
- See also: History of Tunisia; List of years in Tunisia

The following lists events that happened during 2015 in the Tunisian Republic.

== Events ==
=== February ===
- 5 February - A unity government is approved by the parliament and is formed by members of the secular Nidaa Tounes, two liberal parties and a moderate Islamist party.
- 17 February - 20 Islamist militants attack a checkpoint at the Kasserine Governorate, killing 4 police officers and stealing their weapons.

=== March ===
- 18 March - Gunmen attack the Bardo National Museum, adjacent to the parliament building in Tunis, killing at least 19 people.

=== May ===
- 25 May - A Tunisian soldier kills 7 of his fellow soldiers and injures 10 others in a shooting rampage in Tunis before killing himself.

=== June ===
- 26 June - 2015 Ramadan attacks
  - Two hotels are attacked in Sousse by unknown gunmen, killing 38 people and injuring 36. This was on the same day as attacks in France, Kuwait, Syria and Somalia.
- 27 June - 2015 Sousse attacks
  - The Tunisian government plans to close down 80 "propagandist" mosques following the previous attack yesterday.
  - Nineteen of the victims are revealed to be from other countries; fifteen from the United Kingdom and one each from Belgium, Portugal, Germany and Ireland.
- 28 June - 2015 Sousse attacks
  - 1000 Tunisian police officers are deployed on beaches and resorts to increase defence following the attack two days ago.
  - The number of British victims killed in the attack is expected to go up to 30 so the UK government warns its citizens about going to Tunisia.

=== July ===
- 4 July - 2015 Sousse attacks
  - President Beji Caid Essebsi declares a state of emergency.
