= 2018 in Tunisia =

- Decades: 1990s; 2000s; 2010s; 2020s
- See also: History of Tunisia; List of years in Tunisia

The following lists events in the year 2018 in Tunisia.

== Incumbents ==
- President: Beji Caid Essebsi
- Prime Minister: Youssef Chahed
- President of the Assembly of the Representatives by the People: Mohamed Ennaceur

== Events ==
=== January ===
- January 8 – During protests over rising taxes and prices, a protester is killed and five others are injured in clashes with security police in the town of Tebourba.
- January 10 – Hundreds of protesters are arrested as protests against economic conditions continue to spread across the country. 49 police officers are injured during clashes. A Jewish school is also firebombed on the island of Djerba.
