= 2017 in Tunisia =

- Decades: 1990s; 2000s; 2010s; 2020s
- See also: History of Tunisia; List of years in Tunisia

Events in the year 2017 in Tunisia.

== Incumbents ==
- President: Beji Caid Essebsi
- Prime Minister: Youssef Chahed
- President of the Assembly of the Representatives by the People: Mohamed Ennaceur
