= 2013 in Tunisia =

- Decades: 1990s; 2000s; 2010s; 2020s
- See also: History of Tunisia; List of years in Tunisia

The following lists events that happened during 2013 in the Tunisian Republic.

== Events ==
=== February ===
- 11 February: The Union for Tunisia is formed.

=== March ===
- 14 March: The Jebali Cabinet led by Prime Minister Hamadi Jebali dissolves and the Laarayedh Cabinet led by Ali Laarayedh is formed.

=== May ===
- 30 May: The Democratic Current political party is formed.

=== July ===
- 26 July: The National Salvation Front is formed.

=== September ===
- 23 September: The Free Destourian Party is formed.

=== October ===
- 17-19 October: Battle of Touayel

== Sports ==
- Tunisia competes at the 2013 World Aquatics Championships in Barcelona, Spain. Oussama Mellouli wins two medals for Tunisia; one gold medal and one bronze medal.
- Tunisia competes at the 2013 World Championships in Athletics in Moscow, Russia.
