= Abdelwahab Bouhdiba =

Tunisian academic and sociologist (1932–2020)

- Born: 13 August 1932; Kairouan, French Tunisia
- Died: 17 December 2020 (aged 88)
- Occupations: Academic; Sociologist

Abdelwahab Bouhdiba (13 August 1932 – 17 December 2020) was a Tunisian academic, sociologist, and Islamologist.

== Biography ==
After his studies at Sadiki College in Tunis and the Lycée Janson-de-Sailly in Paris, Bouhdiba studied philosophy and literature at the Sorbonne. He earned an agrégation in philosophy in 1959. In 1972, he earned a doctorate with a thesis titled Islam et sexualité, published in 1975 under the title La sexualité en islam.

A professor emeritus at Tunis University, he directed the sociology department at the Faculty of Human and Social Sciences of Tunis. He was Director General of the Centre d'études et de recherches économiques et sociales from 1972 to 1992 and of the Arab League Educational, Cultural and Scientific Organization from 1991 to 1994. He served on the Conseil supérieur islamique tunisien, as well as the executive council of UNESCO.

Bouhdiba was a guest professor at the University of Geneva-based Geneva Graduate Institute and served on the scientific council of the Fondation tunisienne pour la traduction, l'établissement des textes et les études, the École tunisienne de philosophie, the Academy of the Arabic Language in Cairo, and the Arab Academy of Damascus. He was Vice President of the European Academy of Sciences and Arts and President of the Tunisian Academy of Sciences, Letters, and Arts, where he became an honorary member at the end of 2012.

Abdelwahab Bouhdiba died on 17 December 2020 at the age of 88.

== Honours and awards ==
=== Honours ===
- Officer of the Order of the Tunisian Republic (1969)
- Commander of the National Order of Merit of Tunisia (1996)
- Officer of the Ordre des Arts et des Lettres (1998)

=== Awards ===
- UNESCO-Sharjah Prize for Arab Culture (2004)
- Prix Ibn Khaldoun (2015)
- Prix Tahar-Haddad (2018)

== Main publications ==
- Criminalité et changements sociaux en Tunisie (1965)
- Les préconditions sociales de l'industrialisation dans la région de Tunis (1968)
- La sociologie du développement africain : tendances actuelles de la recherche et bibliographie (1971)
- Public et justice : une étude-pilote en Tunisie (1971)
- À la recherche des normes perdues (1973)
- La sexualité en islam (1975)
- Culture et société (1978)
- Raisons d'être (1980)
- Devoir de science et devoir de développement (1982)
- Les Arabes, l'islam et l'Europe (1991)
- Comprendre la dialectique de la société et de la religion (1992)
- Les différents aspects de la culture islamique : l'individu et la société en islam (1994)
- Quêtes sociologiques : continuités et ruptures au Maghreb (1996)
- L'expérience de l'altérité dans les sociétés musulmanes (2002)
- La culture du Coran : À propos de l'œuvre du cheikh Omar Bouhadiba (2004)
- L'Homme en islam (2006)
- Sur les pas d'Ibn Khaldoun (2006)
- Kairouan, la durée (2010)
- Entretiens au bord de la mer (2010)
- L'information et la communication aujourd'hui : aliénation et libération (2010)
- La culture du parfum en islam (2017)
- L'islam : ouverture et dépassement (2018)
