= Ras as-Sana =

Phrase in Arabic

Raʾs as-Sanah (Arabic: رأس السنة, pronounced [raʔs asˈsana]; lit. 'Head of the Year') refers to the beginning of a new year. The expression may mean any of the following:

- Old New Year: Within the Alawites and Middle Eastern Christians, the term Raʾs as-Sanah or Ras el-Seni refers to the Old New Year, which is celebrated by these groups on January 14 in the Gregorian calendar.
- New Year
- Islamic New Year
- Rosh Hashanah: The term Raʾs as-Sanah has a common etymological origin with the Hebrew term Rosh Hashanah, also meaning 'head of the year'.
