= 2014 in Tunisia =

- Decades: 1990s; 2000s; 2010s; 2020s
- See also: History of Tunisia; List of years in Tunisia

The following lists events that happened during 2014 in the Tunisian Republic.

== Events ==
=== January ===
- 26 January - The Tunisian Constitution of 2014 was adopted on 26 January 2014 by the Constituent Assembly.
- 29 January - The Laarayedh Cabinet led by Prime Minister Ali Laarayedh was dissolved and the Jomaa Cabinet led by Prime Minister Mehdi Jomaa was formed.

=== July ===
- 16 July - 2014 Chaambi Mountains attack: Two checkpoints in the Chaambi Mountains are attacked by militants.

=== October ===
- 26 October - The 2014 Tunisian parliamentary election was held.

=== November ===
- 23 November - The 2014 Tunisian presidential election was held.

== Sports ==
- Tunisia competed at the 2014 Summer Youth Olympics held in Nanjing, China from 16 August to 28 August 2014.
