= Khalifa Chater =

Tunisian historian and academic (1936–2026)

- خليفة شاطر
- Born: 12 May 1936
- Died: 13 May 2026 (aged 90)
- Education: Paris-Sorbonne University (DÉ)
- Occupations: Historian; Academic

Khalifa Chater (Arabic: خليفة شاطر; 12 May 1936 – 13 May 2026) was a Tunisian academic and historian.

Chater obtained a Doctorat d'État from Paris-Sorbonne University in 1981 before becoming a history professor at Tunis University. From 1997 to 2002, he was director-general of the National Library of Tunisia. He also directed the Higher Institute of Documentation from 1988 to 1996. In 1996, he was awarded an honorary doctorate from the University of Montpellier Paul Valéry and was honored as an Officer of the National Order of Merit.

Chater died on 13 May 2026, one day after his 90th birthday.
