= 2022 in Tunisia =

- Decades: 2000s; 2010s; 2020s
- See also: History of Tunisia; List of years in Tunisia

Events in the year 2022 in Tunisia.

== Incumbents ==
- President: Kais Saied
- Prime Minister: Hichem Mechichi, Najla Bouden
- President of the Assembly of the Representatives by the People: Rached Ghannouchi
- Government: Mechichi Cabinet, Bouden Cabinet

== Events ==
Ongoing — COVID-19 pandemic in Tunisia

- 14 January - Authorities ban public gatherings on the 11th anniversary of the Arab Spring; police use water cannons to disperse protesters in Tunis.
- 12 February - President Saied dissolves the High Judicial Council, undermining judicial independence; judges begin a four-week strike in response.
- 2 March - Lawyer and former government minister Abderezzak Kilani is jailed and tried by a military court for “disturbing public order” and insulting public officials.
- 21 April - President Saied issues a decree restructuring the independent electoral commission, giving himself influence over all member appointments.
- 1 June - A presidential decree allows Kais Saied to summarily dismiss magistrates; 57 judges are then sacked for alleged corruption.
- 25 July - Tunisia votes in the 2022 Tunisian constitutional referendum proposed by President Saied, which will increase his powers. The vote follows his suspension of parliament and dismissal of the government, prompting widespread protests and concerns over democratic backsliding.
- 15 September - A presidential decree amends the electoral law, reducing assembly seats from 217 to 161 and removing gender parity requirements.
- 16 September - President Saied issues a decree criminalizing the production or dissemination of “false news,” punishable by up to 10 years in prison.
- 15 October - Thousands pour onto the streets and demand President Kais Saied to resign.
- 17 December - 2022 Tunisian parliamentary election.

== Sports ==
- 2022 Tunis Open

== Deaths ==
- 19 December - Jamilia Ksiksi, 54, politician, MP (2014–2021), traffic collision.
