= Khemais Chammari =

Tunisian human rights activist, diplomat and politician (1942–2024)

Member of the Chamber of Deputies of Tunisia
- In office 20 March 1994 – 17 July 1996

Personal details
- Born: 7 November 1942 Tunis, French Tunisia
- Died: 1 January 2024 (aged 81)
- Party: MDS
- Occupation: Human rights activist Diplomat

Khemais Chammari (7 November 1942 – 1 January 2024) was a Tunisian human rights activist, diplomat, and politician of the Movement of Socialist Democrats (MDS). He was sentenced to prison many times by the regime of Zine El Abidine Ben Ali.

== Biography ==
Born in Tunis on 7 November 1942, Chammari earned a degree in economic sciences and sociology. In 1963, he began campaigning for peace and human rights after a conference in Florence on dialogue between Jews and Muslims. From there, he decided to fight against the Tunisian dictatorship, becoming Secretary-General of the Tunisian Human Rights League, then as vice-president from 1982 to 1994. He also served as vice-president of the International Federation for Human Rights from 1982 to 1992.

Chammari was a member of the political movement Perspectives tunisiennes and the MDS party. In 1984, he publicly voiced his opposition to the death penalty. During his political activism, he was arrested five times between 1966 and 1987. In 1994, he was elected to the Chamber of Deputies with the MDS and joined the parliamentary opposition. However, the Chamber of Deputies voted to strip his parliamentary immunity on 21 November 1995 and he was arrested on 10 May 1996. On 17 July 1996, he was officially removed from his position and sentenced to five years in prison. While imprisoned, he was deprived of medical care and outside information. Subject to strong international pressure, he was released from prison on 30 December 1996 on the grounds of his deteriorating health.

After his release, Chammari went into exile before returning to Tunisia in 2004. During this time, he served on the board of directors of EuroMed Rights. In February 2005, he was due to attend a conference of Arab leaders in Algiers, but was expelled from Algerian territory due to alleged links between himself and Algerian Islamist terrorists. On 18 October of that year, he brought together leaders of different Tunisian political parties to create a united opposition to Zine El Abidine Ben Ali, mainly comprising Islamist groups. He then organized a hunger strike which lasted 32 days. However, this move led to greater international visibility for Islamist leader Rached Ghannouchi and his temporary closeness with Ben Ali. In December 2007, he proposed texts on gender equality and freedom of conscience.

In 2011, after the Tunisian Revolution, Chammari was named Ambassador of Tunisia to UNESCO, a position he held for two years. In 2014, he desired to become president of the Truth and Dignity Commission, but instead rallied for the campaign of Sihem Bensedrine.

Khemais Chammari died on 1 January 2024, at the age of 81.

== Distinctions ==
- Prix des Droits de l'homme de la République française (1990)
- Nuremberg Human Rights Award (1997)
- National Order of Merit (2018)
