= Amina Fakhet =

Tunisian singer (born 1968)

Amina Fakhet أمينة فاخت
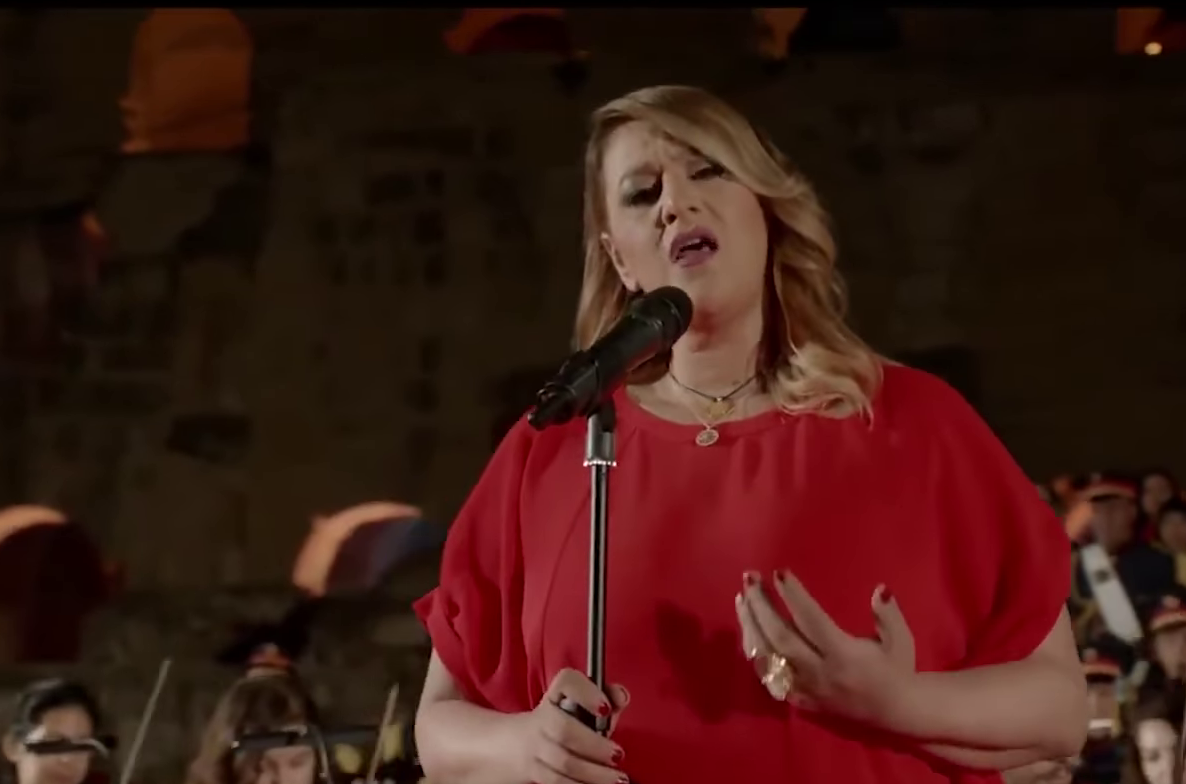
- Fakhet singing in 2019

Background information
- Born: 1968 (age 56–57)

Amina Fakhet (Arabic: أمينة فاخت ; born 1968) is a Tunisian singer. Her career has spanned several decades, during which she has garnered recognition both within Tunisia and internationally. Fakhet's musical style often blends traditional Tunisian elements with contemporary influences.

Amina Fakhet was appointed a Commander of the Tunisian National Order of Merit, in the cultural sector, in 2006.

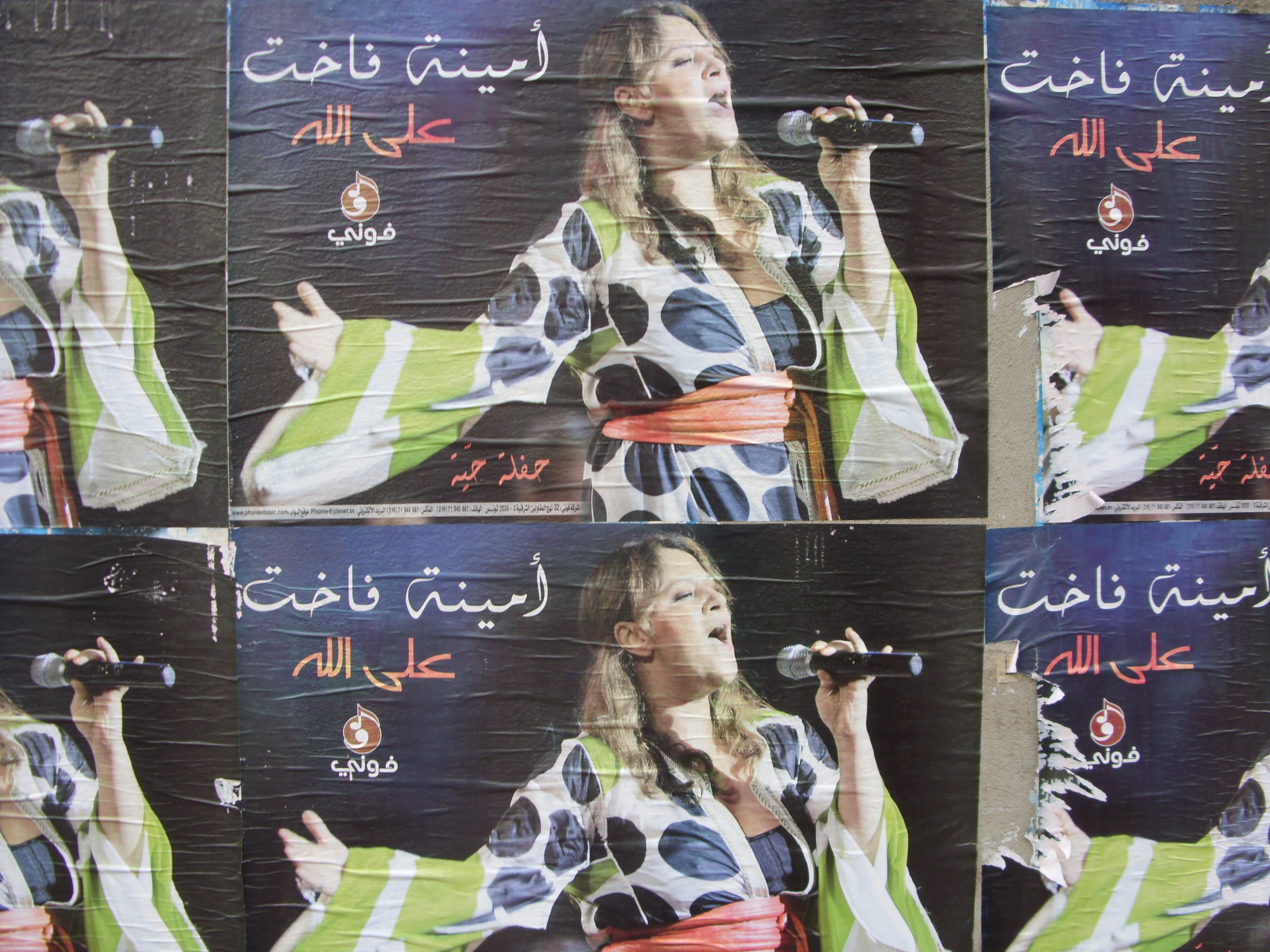
Posters in 2009 in a Tunis street advertising Fakhet's music

Continuing a family tradition in the arts, Amina Fakhet's daughter, Molka Aouij, has also embarked on a singing career. Aouij made her first television appearance as a singer in 2018. Notably, when Amina Fakhet performed at the historic Roman Theatre in Carthage in 2018, her daughter Molka Aouij joined her on stage.
