= Mohamed Gueddiche =

Tunisian cardiologist (1942–2020)

Mohamed Gueddiche (Arabic: محمد قديش; 25 July 1942 – 21 August 2020) was a Tunisian cardiologist, who also held a senior military rank. His national significance in Tunisia was based in part on his position as the personal physician to President Ben Ali, and previous to that as a physician for Ben Ali's predecessor, Habib Bourguiba.

== Life ==
Mohamed Gueddiche was born in Hammamet, a coastal town in the Nabeul Governorate of northeastern Tunisia. It was here that he received his primary schooling, before moving on to the prestigious Lycée Alaoui in Tunis. He then crossed over to metropolitan France where he studied Medicine at Lyon. On his return he took a first post-qualification position as a member of the cardiology department at the Tunis Military Hospital. Following a series of promotions and further qualifications in the end he became director of the hospital.

He worked as a doctor for President Bourguiba, and was one of the seven who were persuaded to sign a doctors' declaration in the early morning of 7 November 1987 stating that the President was no longer fit to rule. He then became the personal physician to Bourguiba's successor, President Ben Ali, a post he held until Ben Ali's own fall from power in January 2011.

Gueddiche's public career was not without controversy. He played a powerfully positive role in the development of cardiology and the Tunisian hospital network, and through organising congresses and other events to progress and disseminate medical knowledge. There are nevertheless critics who allege that he and his family benefitted conspicuously from his closeness to the Ben Ali regime, reflected, it is said, in villas, a monopoly on the import of certain medicaments, and the launch in 2010 by his son of the radio station Express FM.

Gueddiche was a co-founder of the "Revue tunisienne de la santé militaire" ("Tunisian Review of Military Medicine/Health"), a quarterly publication produced continuously since 1999 and edited under the direction of the military health department of the Ministry of Defence.

Mohamed Gueddiche died on 21 August 2020 at the age of 78.

== Honours ==
=== National ===
- Tunisia:
- Grand Officer of the Order of the Tunisian Republic
- Grand Cordon of the National Order of Merit of Tunisia
- Grand Cordon of the Order of 7-November

=== Foreign ===
- France: Commander of Legion of Honour
- France: Commander of the Ordre des Palmes académiques
- Italy: Commander of the Order of Merit of the Italian Republic
- Morocco : Commander of the Order of Ouissam Alaouite
- Portugal : Grand Officier of the Order of Prince Henry
- Romania: Commander of the Order of the Star of Romania
