= Abderrahmane Rahmouni =

Tunisian footballer (1945–2020)

Personal information
- Date of birth: 13 January 1945
- Place of birth: Sfax, French Tunisia
- Date of death: 23 October 2020 (aged 75)

Senior career*
| Years | Team | Apps | (Gls) |
| 1964–1973 | Club Africain | 195 | (41) |
| Total | | 195 | (41) |

International career
| ?–? | Tunisia | ? | (2) |
- * Club domestic league appearances and goals

Abderrahmane Rahmouni (13 January 1945 – 23 October 2020) was a Tunisian footballer. He joined Club Africain at the age of 18 after being noticed by coach Fabio Roccheggiani. He played for the club from 1964 to 1973, when he joined AS Kasserine as a player-coach.

== Awards ==
- Champion of Tunisia (1964, 1967, 1973)
- Winner of the Tunisian Cup (1965, 1967, 1968, 1969, 1970, 1972, 1973)
- Winner of the Maghreb Cup Winners Cup (1971)
- Winner of the Maghreb Champions Cup (1974)
