= Trial of Ghazi Beji and Jabeur Mejri =

2012 trial in Tunis about caricatures of Muhammad

Ghazi Beji and Jabeur Mejri are Tunisian citizens sentenced on 28 March 2012 to 7.5 years' imprisonment for "transgressing morality, defamation and disrupting public order" after posting naked caricatures of Muhammad to Facebook. Mejri faced trial in court, while his friend Beji was convicted in absentia, having fled to Europe to escape prosecution. Mejri's appeal of his sentence was denied on 25 June 2012. Mejri's lawyer objected to his client being denied medical evaluation, describing him as "mentally unstable" and unemployed for the past six years.

Initially, only a few organisations discussed the affair, namely the League of Tunisian Humanists, Reporters Without Frontiers, and other independent militants. the Moroccan Human Rights activist Kacem El Ghazzali equally reported the case on his blog, later on he mentioned Jabeur Mejri's arrest at the UN Human Rights council in Geneva. Amnesty International named the two men prisoners of conscience, "convicted solely for their peacefully held views", and described the case as one of the Tunisian government's "mounting attacks on freedom of expression". The organization called on Tunisia to drop the sentences against both men immediately. The International Freedom of Expression Exchange described the sentencing as "an extremely disturbing event", naming it as part of a pattern of "repeated attacks against journalists, artists and women who commit the 'crime' to express their opinions freely".

Reuters also described the case as feeding charges that the Islamist leaders who had taken power in Tunisia following the January 2011 Tunisian Revolution were suppressing free speech. The Associated Press described the case as having "shocked many Tunisians" and as "a sign of the new importance of Islam in Tunisia". Deutsche Welle cited it as an instance of the disillusionment of Tunisian bloggers following the revolution, writing, "Their revolution appears to have failed." One blogger described the case as an example of how "selective" government prosecutors had become, observing that calls for violence or bombings on Facebook were never similarly prosecuted.

Jabeur Mejri was released from prison in January 2014 having served almost two years.
