= Democratic Party (Tunisia) =

Tunisian political party

Democratic Party الحزب الديمقراطي
- French name: Les démocrates
- Secretary-General: Ilyès Mzoughi
- Founded: April 9, 2016
- Ideology: Liberalism; Secularism

The Democratic Party (Arabic: الحزب الديمقراطي, French: Les démocrates) is a political party in Tunisia founded on 9 April 2016.
