= Gilbert Naccache =

Tunisian writer (1939–2020)

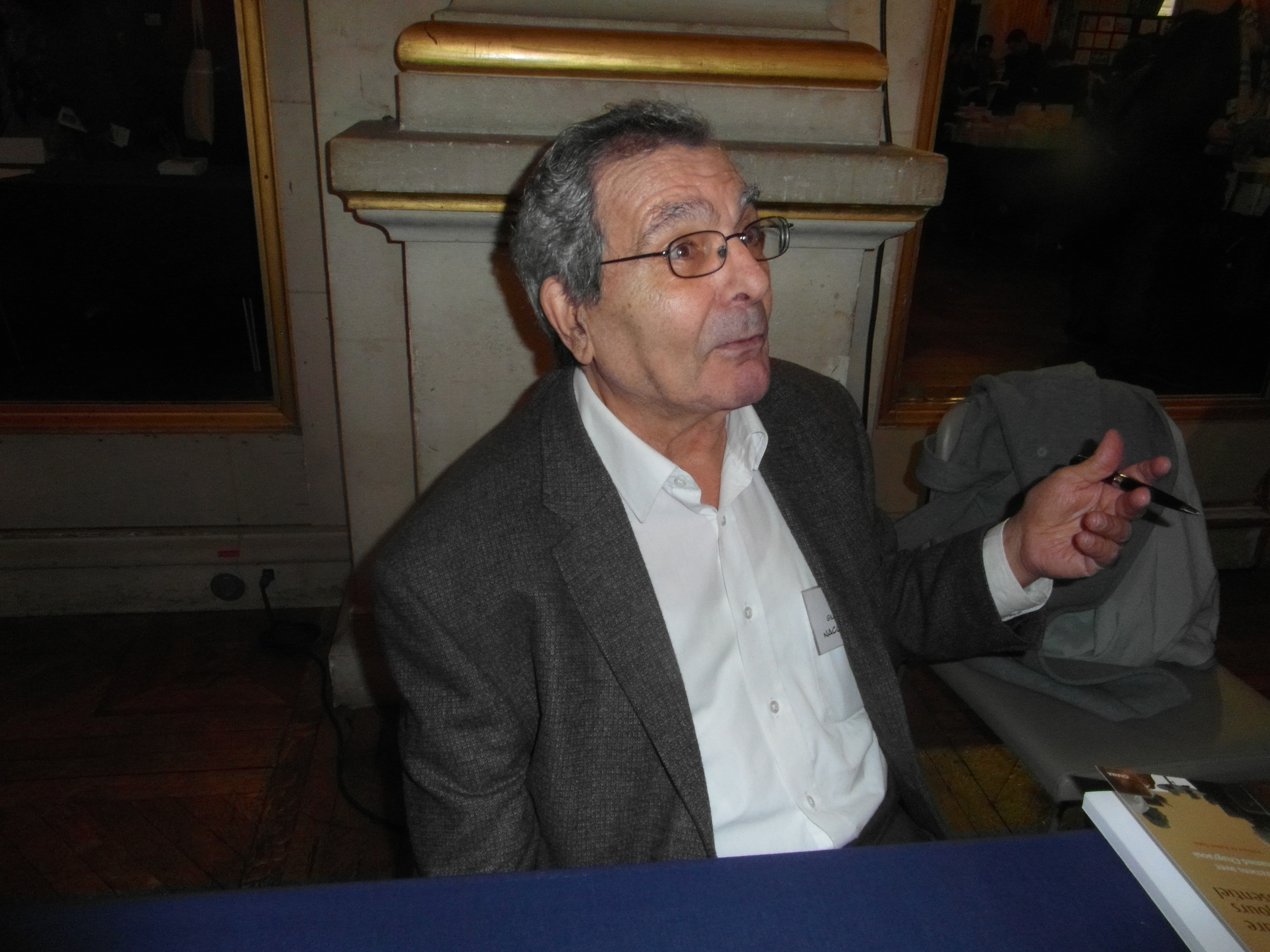
Image of Gilbert Naccache

Gilbert Naccache (15 January 1939 – 26 December 2020) was a Tunisian Jewish writer and leftist activist.

Naccache was born in Tunis. He died, aged 81, in Paris, and was buried in the Borgel Jewish Cemetery in Tunis. He was a founding member of Movement Perspectives, a Tunisian Left wing organisation active in the 1960s and 70s. He was imprisoned for 10 years for his opposition and activism. In prison, he wrote his famous book Cristal on cigarette paper. Naccache would go on to write several other books, including a detailed account of his jail experience. He supported Palestinian rights and remained critical of Israel until his death. Naccahe was active in Tunisian civil society after the 2011 revolution and testified before the Truth and Dignity Commission.
