= Ministry of Environment (Tunisia) =

Government minister of Tunisia

The Ministry of the Environment is responsible for the administration and regulation of the environment in Tunisia. Established in 1991, it has its headquarters at Centre urbain nord 1082 in Tunis. the current minister is Leila Chikhaoui.
