= Sadok Belaïd =

Tunisian jurist and academic (1939–2026)

- الصادق بلعيد
- Born: 3 March 1939
- Died: 7 March 2026 (aged 87)
- Occupations: Jurist, academic

Sadok Belaïd (Arabic: الصادق بلعيد; 3 March 1939 – 7 March 2026) was a Tunisian jurist and academic.

== Life and career ==
Born on 3 March 1939, Belaïd was a longtime professor at Tunis University, as well as a director of Tunis Private University. He was a member of the Conseil tunisien de la recherche scientifique et technologique, the Association tunisienne de droit constitutionnel, the Académie Internationale de Droit Constitutionnel, and the Tunisian Academy of Sciences, Letters and Arts. As an academic, he was a guest professor at dozens of universities around the world.

In the political sphere, Belaïd served on the Higher Authority for Realisation of the Objectives of the Revolution, Political Reform and Democratic Transition. In the 2011 election, he unsuccessfully ran for a seat in the Constituent Assembly for Ben Arous. That September, he created a revised version of the new Constitution's preliminary draft.

Known for his close ties to President Beji Caid Essebsi, he was also a staunch opponent of the Islamist party Ennahda. In 2016, he signed the Carthage Accord, which ended the mandate of Prime Minister Habib Essid. However, the choice of Youssef Chahed as his replacement was condemned by President Essebsi, who severed ties with Belaïd. Belaïd then responded by calling the President and his son "imbeciles".

On 20 May 2022, Belaïd was nominated by President Kais Saied as coordinating chairman of the Consultative Commission. Early the following month, he announced that a new draft constitution would be submitted soon, and that, unlike the 1959 and 2014 constitutions, it contained no reference to Islam. On 3 July 2022, Belaïd announced that the text unveiled on 30 June and submitted to referendum was not the one drafted and presented by the commission, adding that it contained "considerable risks and shortcomings". He considered the new Constitution to be "dangerous".

Belaïd died on 7 March 2026, at the age of 87.

== Decorations ==
- Knight of the Order of the Republic (1981)

== Publications ==
- Essai sur le pouvoir créateur et normatif du juge (1974)
- L'organisation et les institutions d'une communauté économique maghrébine (1987)
- La loi aujourd'hui (1989)
- L'œuvre jurisprudentielle du Tribunal administratif tunisien (1990)
- Les expériences d'intégration régionale dans les pays du tiers-monde (1993)
- Islam et droit : une nouvelle lecture des « versets prescriptifs » du Coran (2000)
- Droit communautaire et mondialisation (2003)
- En hommage à Dali Jazi (2010)
- Beyond Coercion : Durability of the Arab State (2016)
