= Zouheïra Salem =

Tunisian singer (died 2020)

- Born: Béja, French Tunisia
- Died: 27 December 2020; Tunis, Tunisia
- Occupation: Singer

Zouheïra Salem (died 27 December 2020) was a Tunisian singer. She was part of the same generation of singers as Naâma, Oulaya, and Safia Chamia. Her most famous song, Baja bled el mandara wa sabba, was a tribute to her hometown of Béja. She died on 27 December 2020 in Tunis.
