= Meherzia Labidi Maïza =

Tunisian politician (1963–2021)

- محرزية العبيدي معيزة
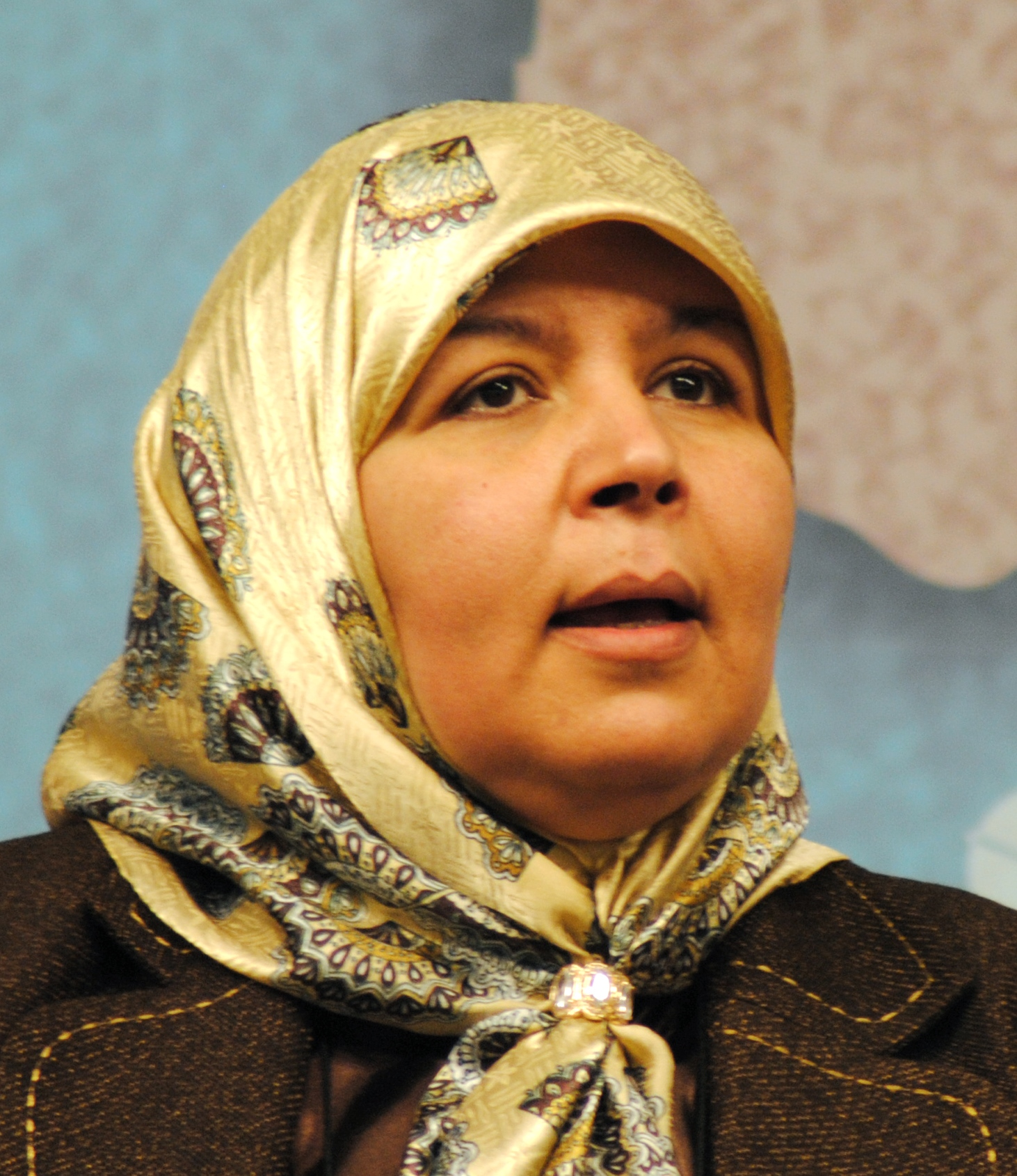
- Labidi Maïza in 2013
- Born: 17 December 1963; Hammamet, Tunisia
- Died: 22 January 2021 (aged 57); Paris, France
- Education: University of Paris III: Sorbonne Nouvelle
- Political party: Ennahda Movement
- Children: 3

Meherzia Labidi Maïza (Arabic: محرزية العبيدي معيزة;17 December 1963 – 22 January 2021) was a Tunisian politician and professional translator and interpreter. She became the first deputy speaker of the Constituent Assembly of Tunisia.

Maïza was the most senior elected woman in the Middle East. She was proud of helping to include a clause to protect women's rights into Tunisia's post Arab Spring constitution.

== Early life and education ==
Meherzia Labidi was born on 17 December 1963, in El Meziraâ in the town of Hammamet in Nabeul Governorate in North East Tunisia. She graduated from a mixed high school in the town of Grombalia in 1982 and then moved south to study at the Ecole Normale Superieure in the city of Sousse.

Labidi-Maïza married in 1986 and went to France with her husband, who is a telecommunications engineer, to study in the École supérieure d'interprètes et de traducteurs at the University of Paris III: Sorbonne Nouvelle. She earned a master's degree in economics and translation and a post-graduate degree in English literature and theatre studies in 1992. She taught translation at the European Institute of Human Sciences in St. Denis.

== Career ==
In 2004 Labidi-Maïza co-authored Abraham, réveille-toi, ils sont devenus fous! (Abraham, Wake Up. They Are Going Crazy) with Laurent Klein. She gave lectures on education in multicultural societies, women, religion and society. From 2006, she was chair of the Global Women of Faith Network.

In 2009, Labidi-Maïza was a member of the European Council of religious leaders. She came to international notice when she supported a more moderate position over wearing the niqab. This was during the French debates that aimed to restrict it being worn in France. In 2015, she served as the honorary president of Religions for Peace, a New York-based NGO recognized at the UN.

=== Politics ===
On 23 October 2011, Labidi-Maïza was elected to the Tunisian Constituent Assembly as a representative of the Ennahda Movement for Tunisians living abroad. She noted that she benefited from a clause that required every other candidate to be a woman. On 22 November she became the First Deputy Speaker of the assembly after receiving 142 out of the 214 votes. In 2012 Labidi-Maïza was described as the "most senior elected woman in the Middle East".

Labidi-Maïza organised the debates that gave birth to Tunisia's new constitution. She was proud of ensuring that women's rights were included in Article 45 of the constitution. She was identified by the Huffington Post as one of eight women who "made the world a better place" in 2014. The post Arab Spring constitution contained clauses that her own supporters did not like but she said, "It's like giving birth: painful, but in the end everyone is happy when the child arrives".

Labidi-Maïza was a French and a Tunisian citizen, daughter of a father of eight children who told them that they must all graduate before they could consider marriage. Her dual nationality was the subject of controversy to her critics. She was married and mother of two girls and a boy.

Labidi-Maïza was elected to the assembly of the representatives of the people in the Tunisian parliamentary election in October 2014, this time in the second level district of Nabeul in north-east Tunisia. In 2015, she was still a member of the Tunisian government and led its committee for women, family, children and the elderly.

=== Sustainable Development Goal ===
Mehrezia Labidi-Maïza, prominently advocated for the sustainable development goal 16 that aimed to promote peaceful and inclusive societies, which was said to build an effective accountable and inclusive community. Furthermore, she also focused on the sustainable development 5, which calls for enhancing women's leadership and participation in all levels and roles in society, particularly in politics.

=== International engagements ===
Mehrezia Labidi-Maïza's involvement in international forums, conferences, or diplomatic initiatives related to equality, women's rights, and democracy was prevalent. he world justice project was an independent organization that works towards advancing the rules of law worldwide. Their event held in the Netherlands in 2013 had many global leaders gather at the World Justice Forum to advance the rule of law worldwide. This event was an occasion that Mehrézia Labidi-Maïza attended and played a role in fighting for equality and women's rights. Her international engagement was consistent that in 2012, she chaired many of the plenary sessions that led to the birth of Tunisia's new constitution. Lastly, Labidi-Maïza attended the high-level women leaders forum in Africa's transformation and the launch of the African Women Leaders Network, which was supported by UN Women.

== Death ==
Labidi-Maïza was reported to have contracted COVID-19 in late 2020 and in mid-November moved to France to receive treatment. Her health deteriorated from early December and she died in early hours of 22 January 2021. The Tunisian Minister of Women's Affairs, Sihem Badi claimed that she had not been suffering from COVID-19. Labidi-Maïza's body was repatriated to Tunisia on 23 January and was buried at Grombalia cemetery, Nabeul on 24 January.
