= 2023 Tunisia migrant boat disasters =

Mediterranean migrant boat sinkings

2023 Tunisian migrant boat sinkings
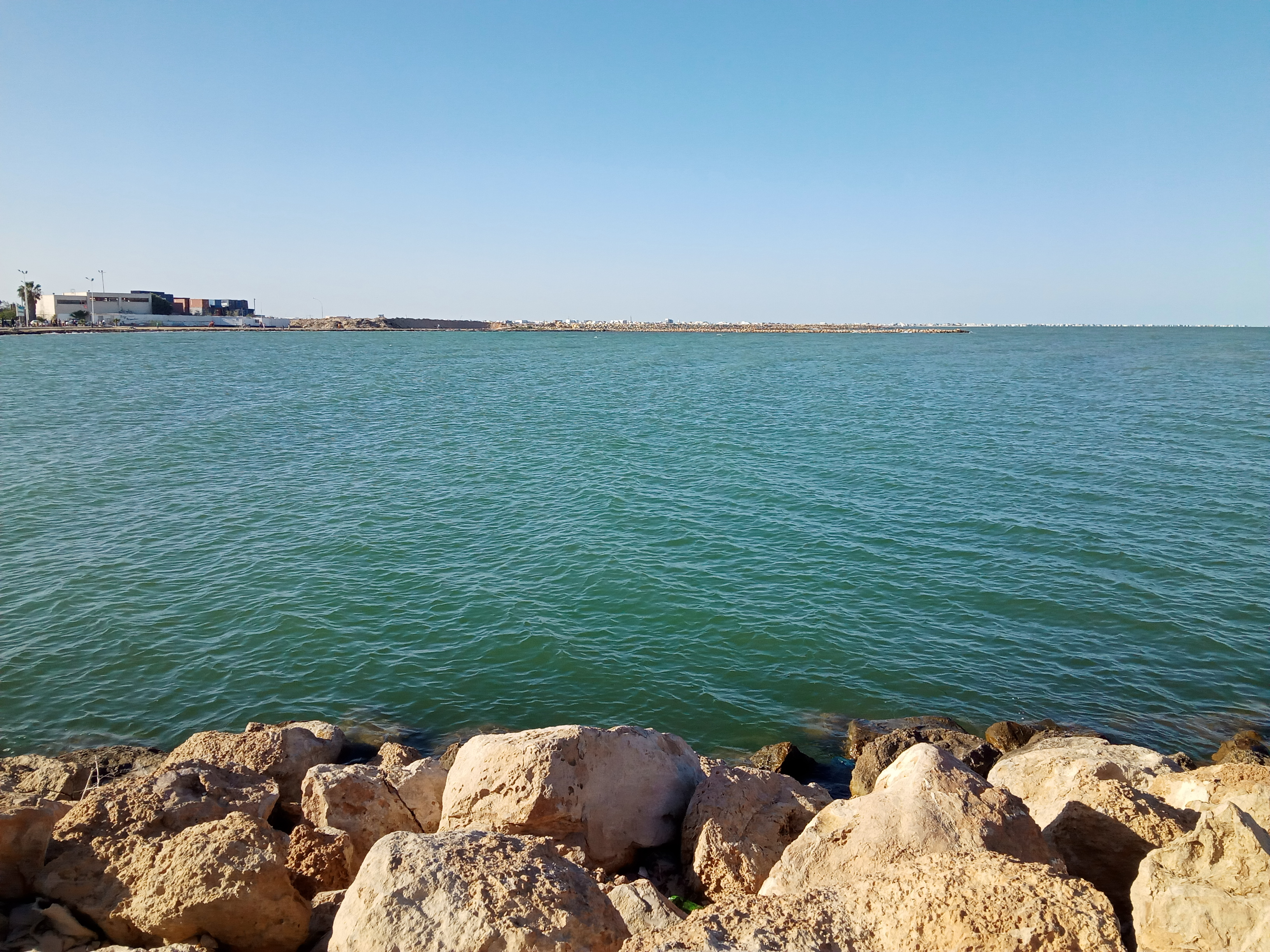
- Coastal view from Sfax.
- Date: 23 March 2023
- Location: Off the Tunisian coast
- Cause: Boat sinking
- Participants: Migrants attempting to reach Italy
- Outcome: At least 34 migrants missing
- Deaths: 5
- Fifth boat to sink in two days in the Mediterranean

On 23 March 2023, a boat sank off the Tunisian coast, resulting in at least five dead and 34 missing migrants. The vessel was attempting to reach Italy, and it was the fifth boat to sink in just two days in the Mediterranean. This incident is part of the ongoing European migrant crisis.

On 12 April 2023, 33 migrants died and 76 people were rescued after a migrant boat sank off Tunisia's shores off the city of Sfax. On 18 April 2023, at least 15 migrants were missing and four others were rescued after a boat heading for Italy sank from the coast of Kerkennah.

== Background ==
Tunisia has become a popular launching point for migrants leaving for Europe, with at least 12,000 migrants arriving in Italy from Tunisia this year alone, compared to 1,300 in the same time period last year. This has put a significant strain on the Tunisian authorities, who have been trying to curb the number of migrants attempting to leave the country.

Tunisia is currently facing its worst financial crisis, and negotiations for a loan with the International Monetary Fund (IMF) have stalled. The country has also faced significant political challenges since July 2021 when Tunisian President Kais Saied seized most powers, shut down parliament, and moved to rule by decree. The unstable political and economic situation in Tunisia has raised concerns among neighboring countries, including Italy.

Italian Prime Minister Giorgia Meloni has warned that if Tunisia's political and economic situation does not stabilize, there might be a "migratory wave" towards Europe. The US Secretary of State Antony Blinken has also urged Tunisia to reach a bailout deal with the IMF urgently. The situation in Tunisia has highlighted the need for a coordinated approach to the migrant crisis across Europe.
