= Radhi Jazi =

Tunisian pharmacist (1927–2020)

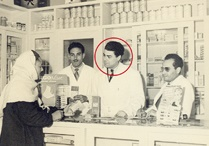
- Radhi Jazi, Tunisian pharmacist, in 1955 in his pharmacy, the first entirely Tunisian pharmacy
- Born: 28 September 1927; Nabeul, French Tunisia
- Died: 27 July 2020 (aged 92)
- Occupation: Pharmacist

Radhi Jazi (Arabic: راضي جازي; 28 September 1927 – 27 July 2020) was a Tunisian pharmacist. He founded the first Tunisian dispensary pharmacy and was one of the most famous dispensary pharmacists in the country's history.

== Biography ==
After his primary studies in his hometown of Nabeul, Jazi started at Sadiki College. He excelled in the French baccalaureate, experimental science series. He continued his studies at the Faculty of Pharmacy in Paris (fr), where he obtained a doctoral degree in pharmaceutical studies. He returned to Tunisia in 1955 and founded the first dispensary pharmacy following independence from France. The pharmacy was located in Djerba and named La Pharmacie d l'Île. While operating his pharmacy, he continued his studies at the Faculty of Sciences of Tunis, where he obtained a degree in organic chemistry in 1968. He transferred his pharmacy to Tunis, where he stayed until his retirement in 2008.

Jazi became a professor at the Faculty of Pharmacy of Monastir in 1978. During his tenure, he taught classes on pharmaceutical law and legislation. In 1993, the Higher Institute of the Judiciary in Tunis assigned him to instruct on legislation regarding poisonous substances.

Jazi co-founded Essaydali de Tunisie in 1981, and was elected Honorary President for life in 1988. After his retirement, he continued to contribute to the editorial board. He was appointed as a member of the scientific council of the Tunisian Academy of Sciences, Letters, and Arts in September 2012.

Jazi died on 27 July 2020, aged 92.

== Publications ==
- Contribution à l'étude de l'histoire de la pharmacie arabe : falsification et contrôle des médicaments pendant la période arabe (1966)
- Zad el mouçafer (1986, 1999)
- Traité des parfums et des essences (2007)
- Traité de la médecine des pauvres et des déshérités (2009)
- Traité de la médecine des personnes âgées et de leur hygiène de vie (2009)

== Distinctions ==
Jazi had a total of 19 career accolades. Among them a Medal of Honor he received in 1998.
