= Mohamed Ghozzi =

Tunisian poet and critic (1949–2024)

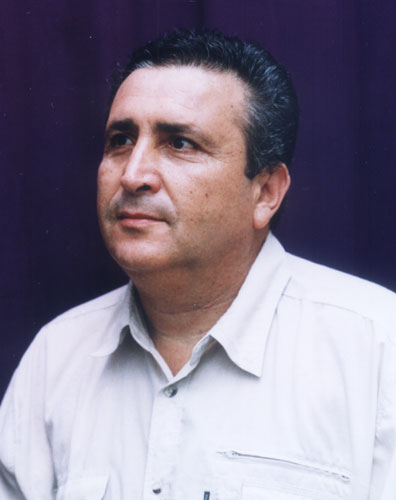

Mohamed Ghozzi (Arabic: محمد الغزي; 24 February 1949 – 18 January 2024) was a Tunisian poet and critic, known for his poems with rich allusions for Sufism and childhood. He also wrote many tales and several plays. Ghozzi died on 18 January 2024, at the age of 74.

== Early life ==
Mohamed Ghozzi was born on 24 February 1949 in Kairouan, where he continued his primary and secondary education. He obtained a degree in Arabic literature in 1973, and a DEA in literary criticism in September 1989.

== Publications ==
=== Poetry ===
- The Book of the Water, The Book of the , Tunis, 1982
- He Has so Much Given, I Have Little Taken, Tunis, 1991 (Abou el Kacem Chebbi Award in Tunis)
- The Little I Had Taken Is Considerable, Tunis, 1999
- There is an Other Light, Beyrouth, 2007
- Night Poems, Tunis, 2007

=== Plays ===
- Ibnou Rochd (Averroès) (First Award at Theater Festival in Charjah)
- The Station
- Cicada, Teach Me to Sing
- The Clown

=== Children's tales ===
- The Sad Melody of the Flute (First Award Fatma bint Hazaa in Abu Dhabi)
- Sea Tale
- Shepherd's Star
- The Little Fish
- Letter to Winter
- The Clouds and the Autumn
- Spring's Rose
- A Star Story
- The Present
