= 2016 Djebel Jelloud train accident =

Train accident in Tunisia

Details
- Date: 28 December 2016; 6:00 CET
- Location: Djebel Jelloud, Tunis
- Coordinates: 36.77°N 10.22°E
- Country: Tunisia
- Incident type: collision
- Cause: The speed of the bus driver, and other indirect causes.

Statistics
- Trains: 1 (train and bus)
- Deaths: 5
- Injured: about 52

On 28 December 2016, a collision has taken place between train No. 51/6, and the bus of the Nabeul Governorate Regional Transport Corporation (fr), The accident at the level of the National Road 1 (fr) in Sidi Fathallah (fr), a neighborhood in Djebel Jelloud fr), near Tunis capital of Tunisia, resulting 5 deaths and about 52 injuries. Among the dead are two officers of the Tunisian Armed Forces, an agent of the Anti-terrorism Brigade (BAT) (fr), a woman and an infant.

== Investigation ==
The Ministry of Transport of Tunisia has created a commission of inquiry into the incident and promised to provide results in a matter of a week, and already, presented their findings on 4 January 2017, and said that the direct reason is the excessive speed of the driver bus and lack of attention for voice alarm issued by the train, while the indirect reason is the delay Tunisian Railways to repair defects and automatic barrier, and lack of coordination with the authorities concerned to put temporary necessary signals, and finally the non-existence of a safety-man in the intersection at this time early, as the work begins at seven o'clock.
