= Saâdeddine Zmerli =

Tunisian urologist and politician (1930–2021)

- سعد الدين الزمرلي
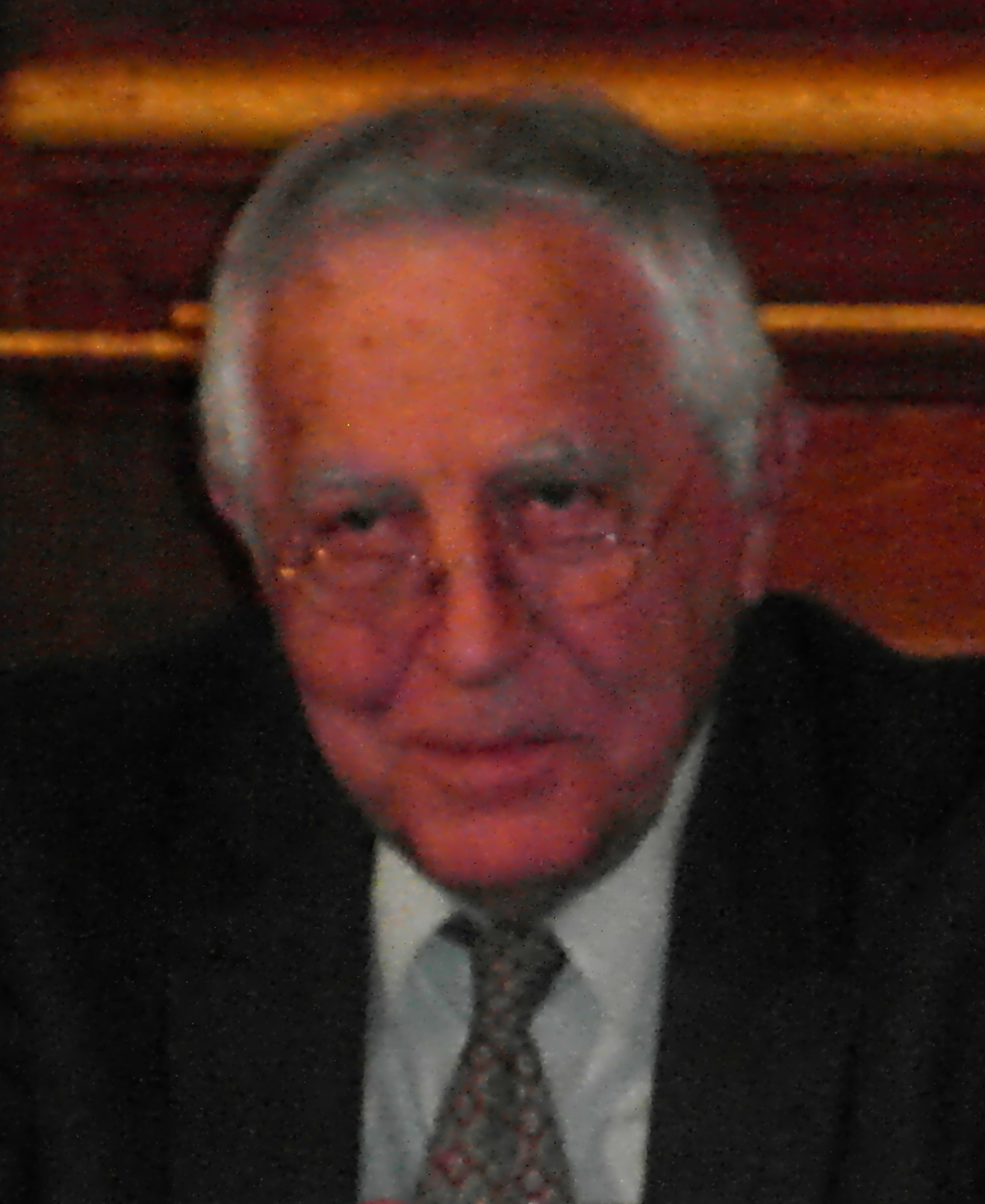
- Born: January 7, 1930; Sidi Bou Said, Tunisia
- Died: March 26, 2021 (aged 91)
- Occupations: author, historian, professor

Saâdeddine Zmerli (Arabic: سعد الدين زمرلي) (January 7, 1930 – March 26, 2021) was a Tunisian urologist and politician. He spent twelve years in France, ten years in Algeria and eighteen years in Tunisia.

== Biography ==
In 1973, Saâdeddine left Algeria, eight years after a convocation from the Tunisian president Bourguiba who asked him to create the urology service in Charles Nicolle hospital in Tunis.

From July 25, 1988 to April 10, 1989 Pr. Zmerli was nominated as the Minister of Health.
