= Saadia Mosbah =

Tunisian anti-racist activist (born c. 1960)

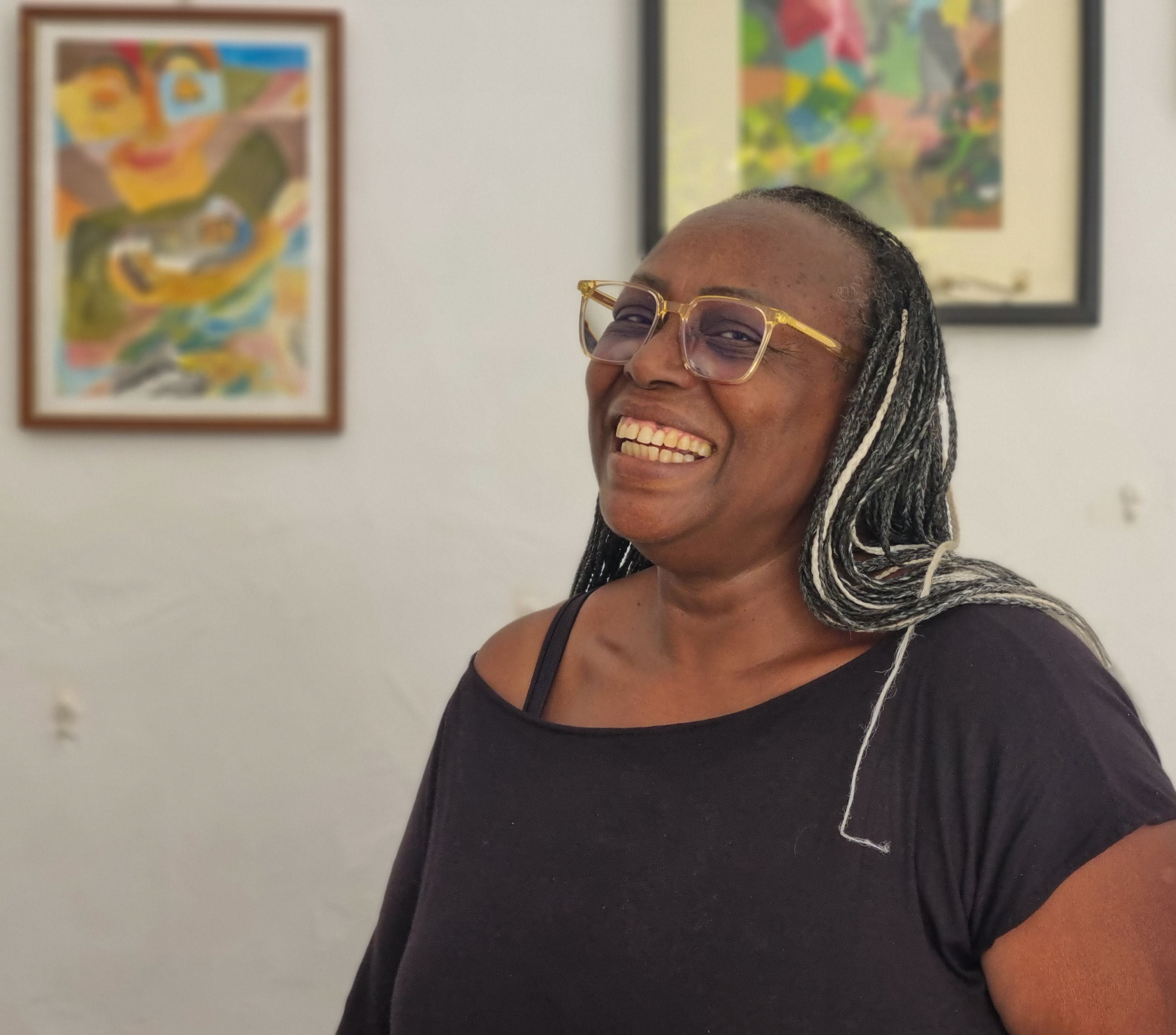
- Mosbah in October 2023
- Born: 1960 (age 65–66); Tunis, Tunisia
- Occupation: Human rights activist
- Organization: Mnèmty
- Movement: Anti-Black racism

Saadia Mosbah (Arabic: سعدية مصباح, romanized: Saʻdīyah Miṣbāḥ, born c. 1960) is a Tunisian human rights activist and the leader of the anti-racism group Mnèmty. Mosbah is known for her fight for minority and sub-Saharan migrants rights in Tunisia, and contributed to efforts to pass a law against racial discrimination in 2018. In 2025, Mosbah was a finalist for the Martin Ennals Award for Human Rights Defenders.

Following a crackdown on civil society organisations in Tunisia by President Kais Saied, Mosbah was arrested in May 2024 on charges of money laundering and illicit enrichment. She was sentenced in March 2026 to eight years in prison and fined US$35,000. Amnesty International described Mosbah's sentence as "shocking and profoundly unjust" and called it an example of Tunisian authorities' use of the criminal justice system to "silence" activists.

An appeal hearing concerning Mosbah's sentence was scheduled for 19 June 2026 at the Tunis Court of Appeal.
