= Abderrazak Kéfi =

Tunisian politician (1938–2026)

- عبد الرزاق كافي

Minister of Transport
- In office 2 October 1987 – 27 July 1988
- Preceded by: Mohamed Kraïem
- Succeeded by: Ahmed Smaoui

Minister of Tourism
- In office 7 November 1987 – 27 July 1988
- Preceded by: position established
- Succeeded by: Mohamed Jegham

Minister of Information
- In office 18 June 1983 – 8 July 1986
- Preceded by: Tahar Belkhodja
- Succeeded by: Zakaria Ben Mustapha

Personal details
- Born: 22 April 1938 Kairouan, French Tunisia
- Died: 19 February 2026 (aged 87)
- Party: PSD; RCD
- Occupation: Businessman

Abderrazak Kéfi (Arabic: عبد الرزاق كافي; 22 April 1938 – 19 February 2026) was a Tunisian politician of the Socialist Destourian Party (PSD) and the Democratic Constitutional Rally (RCD).

Kéfi was nominated for director of Radiodiffusion-Télévision Tunisienne in 1982 before serving as Minister of Information from 1983 to 1986. He was then Minister of Tourism and Minister of Transport from 1987 to 1988.

Abderrazak Kéfi died on 19 February 2026, at the age of 87.
