= National Order of Merit (Tunisia) =

National Order of Merit الوسام الوطني للاستحقاق Ordre national du Mérite

Awarded by the President of Tunisia
- Type: Order of merit
- Awarded for: distinguished and meritorious services to the state
- Status: Currently constituted
- President of Tunisia: Kais Saied
- Grades: Grand Cordon; First Class; Second Class; Third Class; Fourth Class

Precedence
- Next (higher): Order of the Republic
- Next (lower): National Order of Cultural Merit
- Ribbon bar of the order

The National Order of Merit (Arabic: الوسام الوطني للاستحقاق, French: Ordre national du Mérite) is a state award of the Republic of Tunisia.

== History ==
The National Order of Merit was established by Decree No. 98-997 of 2 May 1998 with the aim of systematizing numerous awards of merit in various fields of activity as a single Order of Merit. The statute of the award was amended in 2004, 2006 and 2008.

== Classes ==
The Order has five classes:

- Grand Cordon - wears the badge on a sash on the right shoulder, plus the star on the left chest;
- Class 1 (equivalent to rank of "Grand Officer") - wears the badge on a necklet, plus the star on the left chest;
- Class 2 (equivalent to rank of "Commander") - wears the badge on a necklet;
- Class 3 (equivalent to rank of "Officer") - wears the badge of the order on a ribbon with a rosette on the left chest;
- Class 4 (equivalent to rank of "Knight") - wears the badge of the order on a ribbon on the left chest.

== Description ==
The badge of the Order is a seven-pointed star of dark blue enamel with a golden rim and with gold strals between the rays in the form of seven dihedral pointed rays of different sizes, arranged pyramidally. At the base of the rays are shortened five dihedral pointed rays of different sizes, arranged pyramidally. In the center of the star is a gold medallion with a wide border, on which a laurel wreath is located in relief. In the center of the medallion there is a relief state emblem, on top of the inscription in Arabic "Republic of Tunisia", and on the bottom: "National Order of Merit". The badge is attached to the order ribbon with the help of a ring.

The star of the order is similar to the badge, but larger.

The ribbon of the order is silk, moire, dark blue with wide gold stripes near the edge.

== Notable recipients ==
- Tunisia: Habib Bourguiba
- Tunisia: Fouad Mebazaa
- Tunisia: Moncef Marzouki
- Tunisia: Beji Caid Essebsi
- Tunisia: Kais Saied
- Tunisia: Samia Abbou
- Nigeria: Akinwumi Adesina
- Tunisia: Selma Baccar
- Germany: Thomas Bach
- Tunisia: Yadh Ben Achour
- Tunisia: Lotfi Bouchnak
- Tunisia: Najla Bouden
- Tunisia: Abdelwahab Bouhdiba
- Sweden: Prince Carl Philip of Sweden, Duke of Värmland
- Tunisia: Mohamed Hédi Chérif
- France: Bernadette Chirac
- Netherlands: Prince Claus of the Netherlands
- Sweden: Prince Daniel of Sweden, Duke of Västergötland
- Egypt: Naguib Mahfouz
- Egypt: Adel Emam
- Tunisia: Amina Fakhet
- Syria: Sabah Fakhri
- Tunisia: M'hamed Hassine Fantar
- Tunisia: Mohamed Gueddiche
- Tunisia: Zine El Abidine Ben Ali
- Tunisia: Mohamed Ghannouchi
- Libya: Mohamed Hassan
- Jordan: Prince Hassan bin Talal
- Tunisia: Ons Jabeur
- Tunisia: Maya Jribi
- Tunisia: Chedli Klibi
- France: Roger Lemerre
- Tunisia: Sami Trabelsi
- Tunisia: Faouzi Benzarti
- Egypt: Naguib Mahfouz
- Tunisia: Ahmed Ounaies
- Tunisia: Moncef Ouannes
- Germany: Hans-Gert Pöttering
- Senegal: Léopold Sédar Senghor
- Sweden: Queen Silvia of Sweden
- Saudi Arabia: Prince Sultan bin Salman Al Saud
- Tunisia: Mohamed Talbi
- Algeria: Abdelmadjid Tebboune
- Tunisia: Hatem Trabelsi
