= Mustapha Filali =

Tunisian politician (1921–2019)

- مصطفى الفيلالي
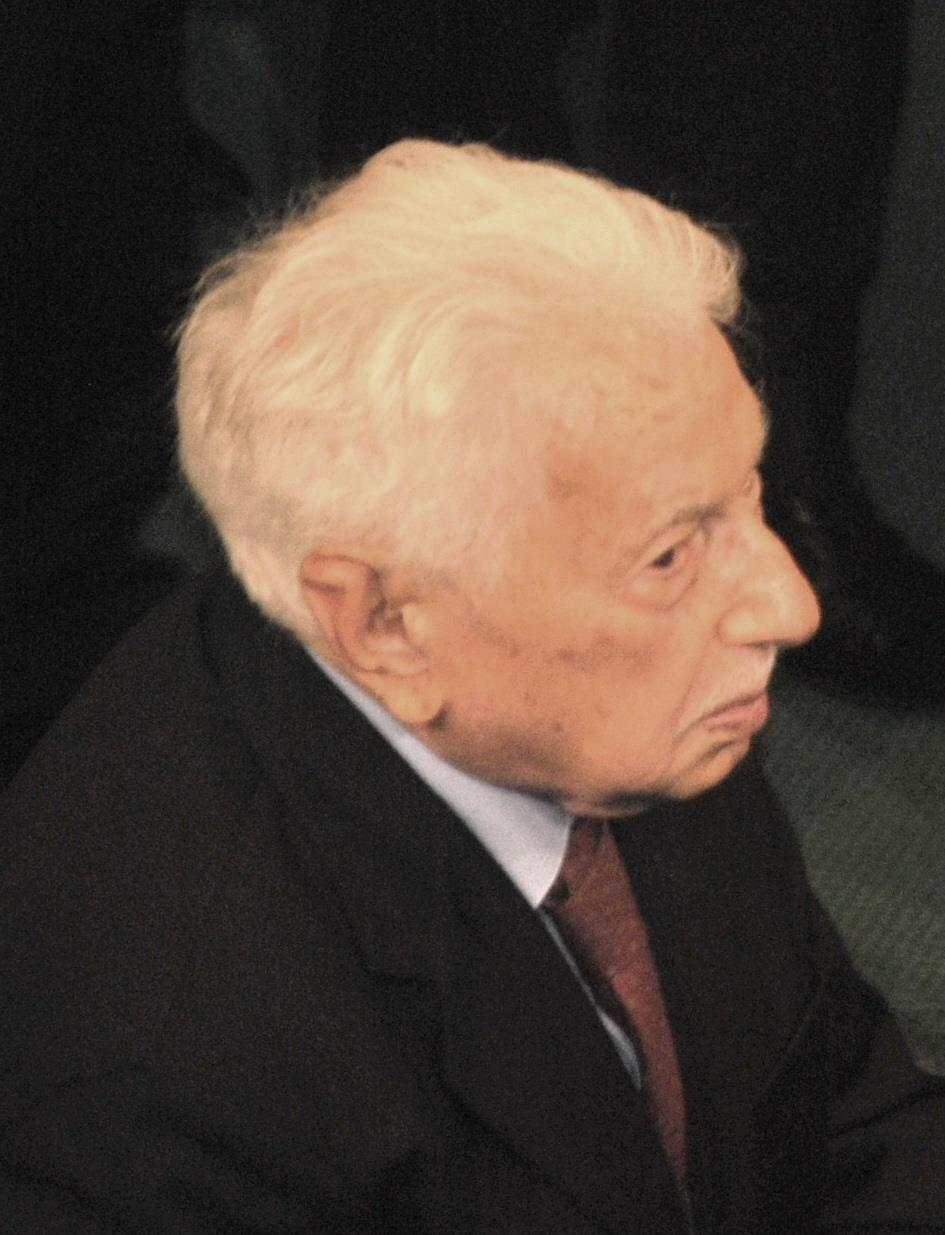
- Mustapha Filali, 2011
- Born: 5 July 1921; Nasrallah, French Tunisia
- Died: 20 January 2019 (aged 97)
- Occupation: Politician

Mustapha Filali (Arabic: مصطفى الفيلالي 5 July 1921 – 20 January 2019) was a Tunisian politician. He was the first Tunisian Minister of Agriculture after their independence.

== Biography ==
Filali studied at Sadiki College and the Faculté des lettres de Paris, obtaining a graduate degree in Arabic literature. After his education, Filali served as a teacher of literature in primary and secondary schools in Tunisia. He was very active in the Tunisian General Labour Union (UGTT), where he worked to improve the economy of Sfax.

Due to the UGTT's support of Habib Bourguiba, Filali was appointed as minister of agriculture once Bourguiba gained power as independent Tunisia's first president in 1956. As minister, Filali worked to end habous. Filali was then appointed as minister of information. However, he would leave the government on 30 December 1958. He would lead the Socialist Destourian Party from 26 October to 31 October 1971. After the 2011 Tunisian revolution, Filali was a member of the Higher Authority for Realisation of the Objectives of the Revolution, Political Reform and Democratic Transition.

Aside from his political work, Filali was head of the Maghreb office of the International Labour Organization in Algeria. He was also on the board of directors for the Studies Center of Arab Unity in Beirut.

== Awards ==
- Grand Officer of the Tunisian Order of Independence (1966)
- Grand Officer of the Order of the Republic of Tunisia (1968)
- Medal of the President of Algeria (2013)

== Works ==
- Islam and the new international economic order (الإسلام و النظام الاقتصادي الدولي الجديد)
- Maghreb: the call of the future (المغرب العربي الكبير: نداء المستقبل)
- The Tables of the Inchirah (موائد الانشراح)
