= Public holidays in Tunisia =

This is a list of holidays in Tunisia.

- January 1: New Year's Day
- March 20: Independence Day
- April 9: Martyrs' Day
- May 1: Labour Day
- July 25: Republic Day
- August 13: Women's Day
- October 15: Evacuation Day
- December 17: Revolution and Youth Day

Following Islamic lunar calendar

- Muharram 1: Islamic New Year
- Rabi' al-Awwal 12: Mawlid
- Shawwal 1: Eid al-Fitr
- Dhu al-Hijjah 10: Eid al-Adha
