= List of years in Tunisia =

This is a timeline of Tunisian history. Each article deals with events in Tunisia in a given year.

== Nineteenth century ==
1890s
1890
1891
1892
1893
1894
1895
1896
1897
1898
1899

1880s
1880
1881
1882
1883
1884
1885
1886
1887
1888
1889

1870s
1870
1871
1872
1873
1874
1875
1876
1877
1878
1879

1860s
1860
1861
1862
1863
1864
1865
1866
1867
1868
1869

1850s
1850
1851
1852
1853
1854
1855
1856
1857
1858
1859

1840s
1840
1841
1842
1843
1844
1845
1846
1847
1848
1849

1830s
1830
1831
1832
1833
1834
1835
1836
1837
1838
1839

1820s
1820
1821
1822
1823
1824
1825
1826
1827
1828
1829

1810s
1810
1811
1812
1813
1814
1815
1816
1817
1818
1819

1800s
1800
1801
1802
1803
1804
1805
1806
1807
1808
1809

== Twentieth century ==
- 1950s: 1956 1957 1958 1959
- 1960s: 1960 1961 1962 1963 1964 1965 1966 1967 1968 1969
- 1970s: 1970 1971 1972 1973 1974 1975 1976 1977 1978 1979
- 1980s: 1980 1981 1982 1983 1984 1985 19861987 1988 1989
- 1990s: 1990 1991 1992 19931994 1995 1996 1997 1998 1999

== Twenty-first century ==
- 2000s: 2000 2001 2002 2003 2004 2005 2006 2007 2008 2009
- 2010s: 2010 2011 2012 2013 2014 2015 2016 2017 2018 2019
- 2020s: 2020 2021 2022 2023 2024
