= Ibrahim Bouderbala =

Tunisian politician (born 1952)

Speaker of the Assembly of the Representatives of the People
- Incumbent
- Assumed office 13 March 2023
- Preceded by: post vacant

Personal details
- Born: 7 August 1952 (age 73)

Ibrahim Bouderbala (born 7 August 1952) is a Tunisian politician who has been President of the Assembly of the Representatives by the People since 13 March 2023.
