= National Women's Day (Tunisia) =

Day of commemoration

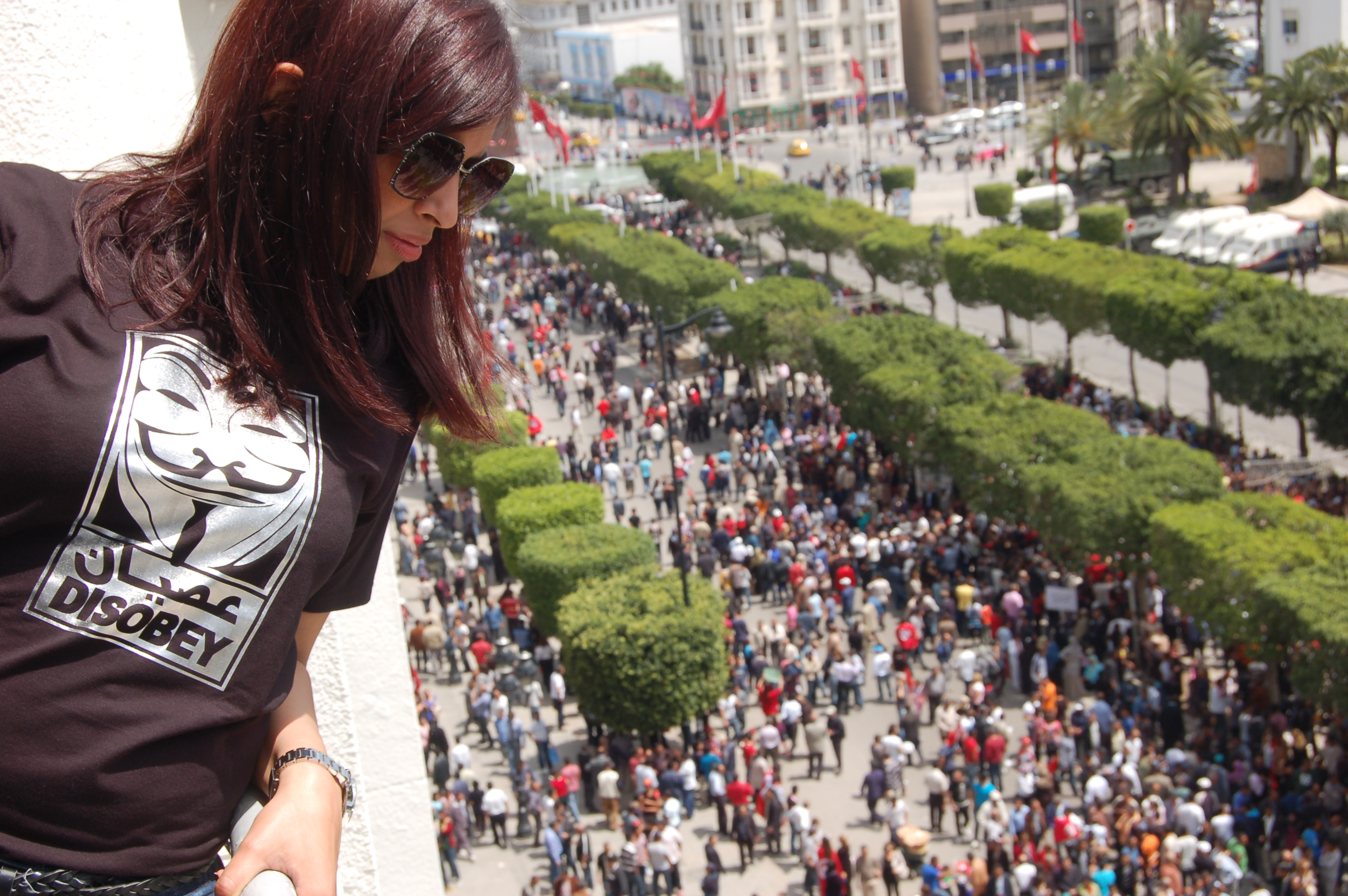
Women activists and feminist organisations organise an annual Women March (2012 shown)

National Women's Day (Arabic: عيد المرأة) is celebrated in Tunisia every year on August 13. It commemorates the day of adoption of the Code of Personal Status in Tunisia, the 13th of August in 1956, the year of independence in Tunisia. The code enacted laws for the family that contain fundamental changes, the most important of which is the prohibition of polygamy, the withdrawal of guardianship from men and the making of divorce by the court instead of men.

In 2017, President Beji Caid Essebsi announced on National Women's Day that he intended to remove gender bias from Tunisian inheritance law, sparking much controversy both from leftist groups who saw it as a political move and conservative groups that saw it as contrary to Sharia law.
