= Islamic New Year =

Beginning of a new lunar Hijri year

- Official name: Arabic: رأس السنة الهجرية; Raʾs as-Sanah al-Hijrīyah
- Also called: Hijri New Year
- Observed by: Muslims
- Type: Islamic
- Begins: Last day of Dhu al-Hijjah
- Ends: 1 Muharram
- Date: 29/30 Dhu al-Hijjah – 1 Muharram
- 2025 date: 25 – 26 June 2025
- 2026 date: 16 June 2026 (estimated (Note: The actual Gregorian date of 1 Muharram may differ by locality according to local traditions, time zone and atmospheric conditions.))

The Islamic New Year (Arabic: رأس السنة الهجرية, Raʿs as-Sanah al-Hijrīyah), also called the Hijri New Year, is the day that marks the beginning of a new lunar Hijri year, and is the day on which the year count is incremented. The first day of the Islamic year is observed by most Muslims on the first day of the month of Muharram. The epoch (reference date) of the Islamic era was set as the year of the emigration of Muhammad and his followers from Mecca to Medina, known as the Hijrah, which corresponds to 622 CE in the Gregorian calendar. All religious duties, such as prayer, fasting in the month of Ramadan, and pilgrimage, and the dates of significant events, such as celebration of holy nights and festivals, are calculated according to the Islamic calendar. Hijri New Year is observed by 24 countries as a public holiday.

While some Islamic organizations prefer determining the new month (and hence the new year) by local sightings of the moon, most Islamic institutions and countries, including Saudi Arabia, follow astronomical calculations to determine future dates of the Islamic calendar. There are various schemas for calculating the tabular Islamic calendar (i.e., not based on observation), which results in differences of typically one or even two days between countries that use such schemes and those that use actual lunar sightings. For example, the Umm al-Qura calendar used in Saudi Arabia was reformed several times in recent years. The current scheme was introduced in 1423 AH (15 March 2002).

A day in the Islamic calendar is defined as beginning at sunset. For example, 1 Muharram 1432 AH was defined as corresponding to 7 or 8 December 2010 CE in civil calendars (depending on the country). For an observation-based calendar, a sighting of the new moon at sunset on 6 December would mean that 1 Muharram lasted from the moment of sunset of 6 December to the moment of sunset of 7 December, while in places where the new moon was not sighted on 6 December 1 Muharram would last from the moment of sunset of 7 December to the moment of sunset of 8 December.

== Alternative date ==
Twelver Shia Muslims believe the Islamic new year is the first of Rabi' al-Awwal rather than Muharram, due to it being the month in which the Hijrah took place. This has led to difference regarding description of the years in which some events took place, such as the Muharram-occurring battle of Karbala, which Shias say took place in 60 AH, while Sunnis say it took place in 61 AH.

== Gregorian correspondence ==
Since the Islamic lunar year is eleven to twelve days shorter than the solar year as approximated by the Gregorian calendar, the Islamic New Year does not occur on the same Gregorian calendar date every year.

The following dates beyond the current year are the Gregorian calendar dates are predicted to correspond with 1 Muharram (Islamic new year), according to Saudi Arabia's Umm al-Qura calendar. (Dates calculated according to the tabular Islamic calendar may differ from the Umm al-Qura calendar dates by one or even two days on either side, because the motions of the sun and moon are not strictly linear and because observation methods and locations differ.)

Islamic year	Gregorian date
1446 AH	8 July 2024
1447 AH	26 June 2025
1448 AH	16 June 2026 (estimated)
1449 AH	6 June 2027 (estimated)
1450 AH	25 May 2028 (estimated)

== See also ==
- Solar Hijri calendar#New Year's Day
