= Chaima Issa =

Tunisian journalist, writer, politician, and activist

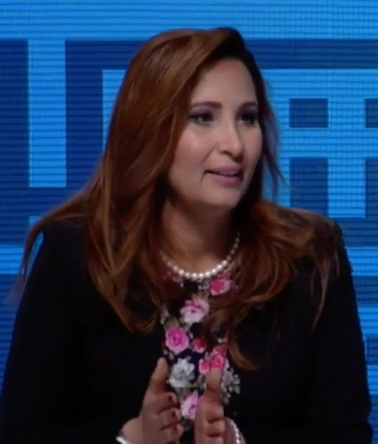
Chaima Issa

Chaima Issa (Arabic: شيماء عيسى) is a Tunisian journalist, writer, poet and human rights activist. She is a senior member of the National Salvation Front, a prominent opposition coalition in Tunisia. She is one of the opposition figures arrested by President Kais Saied on the charges of "conspiracy against state security", and labelled terrorists in February 2023. She is the first woman political prisoner under President Kais Saied rule.

== Studies and political activities ==
Chaima Issa's father was a prominent member of the Islamic Tendency Movement (Ennahdha) imprisoned in the 1990s. Issa studied comparative religion at Zitouna University before going to France for further studies. She ran in the 2014 Tunisian legislative election but lost. In 2020, she was appointed project manager to the Minister for Women and Family during which she published Féminisme et religion.

In 2021, Issa joined the National Salvation Front, a coalition of opposition groups against the 2021 Tunisian self-coup by President Kais Saied.

== Repression ==
Issa was arrested on 22 February 2023 and charged with "conspiring against state security" and remanded in prison. A bail granted her by a judge at the counterterrorism judicial pole in June was blocked by an appeal filed by the public prosecutor. President Saied labelled the detained opposition figures including Issa as terrorists, criminals and traitors and threatened that any judge who frees them would be seen as abetting their alleged crime.

On 13 December 2023, Chaïma Issa was sentenced to one year in prison by a military court which found her guilty in particular of "offending" Kaïs Saïed on the basis of statements made in the media.

On Saturday 29 November 2025, Tunisian police arrested Chaima Issa during her participation in a protest in Tunis, to enforce a 20-year prison sentence issued against her one day before the arrest on 28 November.
