= 2025 Tunisian protests =

The 2025 Tunisian protests are ongoing street protests by a wide range of groups that grew stronger towards the end of 2025, on a wide range of civil, political, economic, and social rights and against environmental pollution. A factor that contributed to amplifying the protests was the heavy prison sentencing of forty people who were mostly critics of president Kais Saied, including political activist Chaima Issa, lawyer Ayachi Hammami, and politician Ahmed Najib Chebbi, in late November.

== Overview ==
As of early December 2025, 4838 protests had taken place in Tunisia, according to the Tunisian Forum for Economic and Social Rights (FTDES), 83 percent more than in 2024, especially during the second half of the year.

Slightly more of the protests concerned civil and political than economic and social rights, which FTDES stated was rare for human rights protests in Tunisia. FTDES attributed the shift towards civil and political rights to popular concern about several judicial cases in late November and early December, including the twenty-year prison sentence for political activist Chaima Issa, the five-year sentence for lawyer Ayachi Hammami, and the twelve-year sentence for Ahmed Najib Chebbi.

== Timeline ==
=== August 2025 ===
In protests organised by the Tunisian General Labour Union (UGTT), two thousand people protested against government economic and political policies in late August.

=== October ===
Protests took place in Gabès in relation to air pollution from a Groupe chimique tunisien chemical factory. The protests spread across Gabès Governorate, leading to a general strike that froze activity in the governorate.

=== November ===
Among the 589 protests counted by FTDES in November 2025, protest themes included the right to work in relation to parliamentary debates about finance law and the recruitment of long-term unemployed people, working conditions, late salary payments, and unfair dismissals. Toxic gases from a chemical factory in Gabès Governorate and access to drinking water in other regions were motivations for other protests in November.

The November protests had a diverse demographic profile, including workers, activists, university students, local residents, trade unions, lawyers, unemployed graduates, journalists, teachers, and farmers.

On 20 November, journalists protested against repression of freedom of the press and the suspension of civil society groups.

On 22 November, a protest of one to two thousand people took place in Tunis, criticising president Kais Saied for "injustice and repression", and stating that Tunisia had become an "open-air prison", with slogans including "No fear, no terror, the streets belong to the people", "The people want the fall of the regime". Saied was criticised by opposition political parties, civil society, and journalists of repressing criticism using the judiciary.

On 28 November, about 40 people, mostly critics of Saied, were given prison sentences ranging up to 45 years for "conspiracy against state security" and "belonging to a terrorist group". A protest was held on 29 November protest, called by the Tunisian Association of Democratic Women (ATFD) and Aswat Nissa. Chaima Issa was arrested during the protest. Nadia Benhamed of ATFD described the protest as opposing "the authorities' systematic suppression of free speech".

=== December ===
On 5 December, the UGTT called for a nationwide strike on 21 January against the repression of human rights and calling for wage negotiations. On 6 December, a protest was held in Tunis, with chants of "the people want to topple the regime" and posters stating "opposition is not a crime" and "Free Tunisia".

A protest was held in Tunis on 13 December. Reuters viewed the protest as showing a "breadth of participation ... across different political currents" that differed from political disunity in previous years. Protestor Noura Amaira was quoted stating that "unity in the streets [became] a necessity, no longer a choice".

A protest of 2500 people was held in Gabès on 17 December against the Groupe chimique tunisien air and sea pollution. In October, Saied had "called for urgent maintenance" of the chemical factory. The protestors called for the factory's permanent closure and relocation.

On 17 December, supporters of Saied held a counter-protest in Tunis, calling the anti-Saied protestors "traitors" and chanting "people want Saied again" and "we support the leadership and sovereignty".

== See also ==
- 2021 Tunisian protests
