= 25th of July Movement =

25th of July Movement حراك 25 جويلية
- Coordinator-general: Fathi Hakimi
- Founded: 15 July 2021
- Ideology: Pro-Saied; Populism; Presidentialism
- Political position: Big tent
- Colours: Red
- Assembly of the Representatives of the People: 80 / 161

Website
- Facebook page

25th of July Movement (Arabic: حراك 25 جويلية, romanized: harak 25 juilia; French: Mouvement/Harak du 25 juillet) is a pro-Kais Saied political movement in Tunisia.

== History ==
The group was created as a Facebook community in support of the president during the development of the political crisis in Tunisia, and scheduled protests for 25 July 2021 on the occasion of Republic Day.

In September 2021, the 25 July Movement called on people not to participate in an anti-presidential demonstration gathered to denounce the self-coup on 25 July 2021 and the extension of the state of emergency.

The movement supported the 2022 constitutional referendum, calling for participation in it despite the boycott of the main political forces in the country.

=== 2022–23 parliamentary election ===
The 25 July Movement announces its participation in the 2022–23 Tunisian parliamentary election. However, they are threatening to boycott the elections if the President of the Republic does not take into consideration the recommendations of his entourage. They finally participate in the elections with 141 candidates including 15 women, without the participation of the members of the political bureau of the movement following their rejection of the sponsorship criteria.

In the first round of elections, with a historically low turnout, the movement won 10 out of 21 seats.

== Ideology ==
The movement strongly opposes parliamentarianism and the Ennahda party, considering it to be Islamic terrorist.

On 22 July 2021, the July 25 Movement published all its demands on its official page, namely:

- Dissolution of parliament and setting a date for early elections
- Reducing the number of representatives of parliament to 119 at the rate of one deputy for every 100,000 inhabitants elected by individual vote in two rounds and respecting the principle of vertical equality
- Establishment of a committee of professors of constitutional law to prevent errors arising from the incorrect drafting of the 2014 constitution
- Giving the President of the Republic the power to dissolve Parliament
- Guarantee the independence of the judiciary
- Deprivation of parliamentary immunity of deputies accused of committing crimes that go beyond the scope of their parliamentary work
- Dissolution of parties that received illegal funding
- Start investigating donations and loans received by the Tunisian state since 2011
- Bring to justice those responsible for the deaths of citizens from the COVID-19
- Recovery of compensation received under the general legislative amnesty
