= 2021 Tunisian self-coup =

July 2021 political crisis

- Part of Arab Winter and COVID-19 pandemic in Tunisia
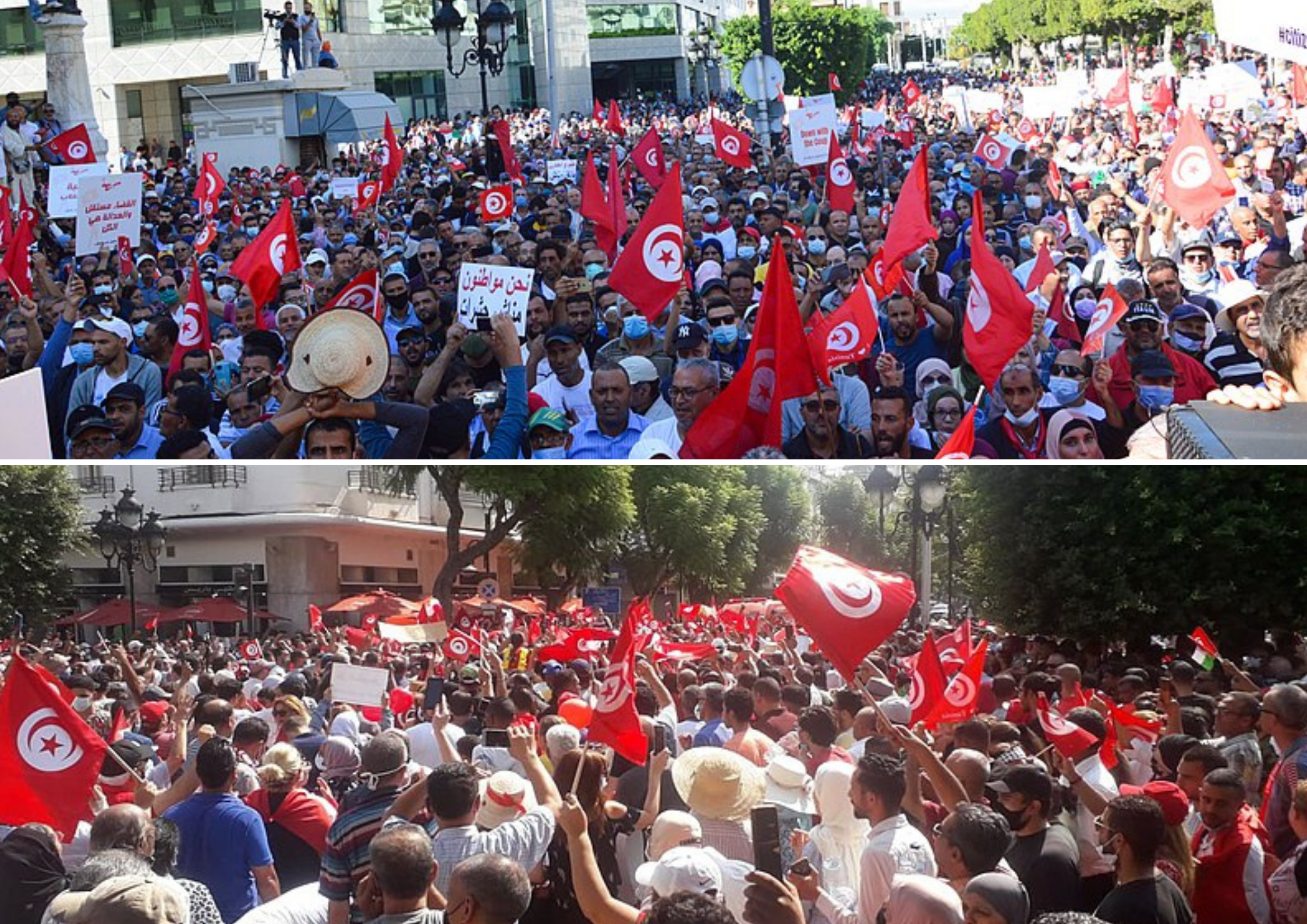
- Above: an anti-coup demonstration, Tunis, 10 October 2021; Below: a pro−Saied demonstration, Tunis, 3 October 2021
- Date: 25 July 2021
- Location: Tunisia
- Caused by: Protests against the Mechichi Cabinet; Collapse of the healthcare system due to the COVID-19 pandemic
- Result: Coup successful: President Kais Saied dismisses the government of Hichem Mechichi and dissolves the Assembly of the Representatives of the People and the Supreme Judicial Council; Najla Bouden is appointed Prime Minister and forms a new government.; A new constitution is adopted in a constitutional referendum with expanded presidential powers; Boycott of subsequent parliamentary election; Judicial proceedings initiated against Saied's opponents

Parties
President of Tunisia; Tunisian Armed Forces; Tunisian National Guard; 25th of July Movement; People's Movement; Libya	Parliament of Tunisia; National Salvation Front; Ennahda; Dignity Coalition; Republican Party

Lead figures
Kais Saied (President of Tunisia, Supreme Commander of the Armed Forces); Najla Bouden (Prime Minister of Tunisia)	Rached Ghannouchi (Dismissed Speaker of the Parliament, Leader of Ennahdha); Hichem Mechichi (Dismissed Prime Minister of Tunisia)

The 2021 Tunisian self-coup took place on 25 July 2021, when Tunisian President Kais Saied dismissed the government of Hichem Mechichi, suspended the Assembly of the Representatives of the People and revoked the immunity of its members. Described as a self-coup, the move came after a period of political instability marked by a series of protests against the Ennahda-backed government and the collapse of the Tunisian healthcare system amidst the COVID-19 pandemic in the country.

The day after the self-coup, Saied imposed a month-long curfew from 7 p.m. to 6 a.m. After the 30-day period expired, Saied extended the period of his measures "until further notice". In October, Najla Bouden was appointed to head a new government, making her the first female prime minister both in Tunisia and the Arab world. In July 2022, a new constitution expanding the president's powers was adopted after a referendum boycotted by over two-thirds of voters, paving the way for parliamentary elections in December 2022 and January 2023 which were also boycotted by a large sector of the population.

== Background ==
=== Saied-Mechichi: Parliament deadlock ===
In September 2020, the government of Hichem Mechichi was formed. The government exclusively consisted of independent technocrats and was supported, although "grudgingly", by the Ennahda party, the biggest parliamentary bloc led by Speaker Rached Ghannouchi.

In January 2021, Mechichi proposed a cabinet reshuffle which was approved by parliament, but president Kais Saied rejected the reshuffle, claiming that the proposed ministers of health, energy, employment and sports have conflicts of interest.

Saied and Mechichi also differed on their interpretations of the constitutional authorities of the president and prime minister, primarily the amount of influence the president is given on the government's operation. Saied was also in a stalemate with the country's legislative body, the Assembly of the Representatives of the People, on their respective constitutional powers. Normally, such disagreements would be resolved by the constitutional court, but the court's members have not been appointed yet.

Saied demanded that Mechichi resign in order for dialogue to take place, but the latter refused to step down, stating that he was "responsible for salvaging a country gripped by political and economic woes".

=== COVID-19 and protests against Ennahda ===
The standoff between the president and prime minister paralysed the government, contributing to the state's poor response to the COVID-19 pandemic. On 8 July 2021, the Health Ministry said that the country's health system has "collapsed under the weight of the COVID-19 pandemic".

Protests spread across the country against economic mismanagement and the response to COVID-19 and calling for the resignation of the government and the dissolution of the parliament. In some instances, these protests turned violent, and on 25 July, protestors attacked Ennahda's offices in Monastir, Sfax, El Kef and Sousse.

== Announcement ==
On the night of 25 July 2021, Saied announced in a televised address the adoption of "extraordinary measures", namely the dismissal of the government, the suspension of parliament and the lifting of its members' parliamentary immunity. Saied said that he would assume executive authority with a new prime minister, and also declared himself attorney general.

In the announcement, which came after meetings between Saied and his top advisors and security leaders at his palace, Saied warned "any who think of resorting to weapons". Hours later, military forces were deployed to barricade the parliament's headquarters, preventing Ghannouchi and other parliamentarians from entering the building.

== Reactions ==
=== Domestic ===
Many Tunisians initially supported the move, with tens of thousands taking to the streets to celebrate the coup soon after its announcement. However, economic downturn since reduced the popularity of Saied and the new constitution.

The next day after the coup, Mechichi released a statement on social media in which he announced that he would hand over authority to the next prime minister the president chooses, saying that he won't "play an obstructive role in complicating the situation in Tunisia" and that he will "continue to serve his country under all circumstances". Middle East Eye (MEE) reported that Mechichi was physically assaulted and forced to resign. This was denied by Mechichi, but the MEE "stood by its report". Mechichi's first public appearance came eleven days after the coup at the Tunisian anti-corruption agency to declare his properties.

Ghannouchi, on the other hand, immediately rejected Saied's decisions and said that he would call a parliamentary session in defiance of the president, whose move he called a "full-fledged coup". However, the military blocked Ghannouchi from entering the parliament building, so he led a sit-in protest in front of it.

The coup was immediately denounced by Ennahda, the Dignity Coalition and the Heart of Tunisia, the three main parties in parliament. Former president Moncef Marzouki, who oversaw the transition to democracy after the revolution, also rejected the coup, calling it "the beginning of slipping into an even worse situation".

In September 2021, a four-party coalition between Ettakatol, the Democratic Current, Afek Tounes and the Republican Party adopted a position against the coup. In May 2022, another coalition was announced, the National Salvation Front, between Ennahda, the Dignity Coalition, the Heart of Tunisia, Al Amal, Al Irada and five civil society groups along with independent politicians.

The Tunisian General Labour Union (UGTT), Tunisia's national trade union center, initially supported the coup, but the relationship between Saied and the UGTT soured, with the UGTT repeatedly voicing concerns about Saied's commitment to preserving rights and freedoms.

=== International ===
Several countries and supranational bodies reacted with concern to the coup and encouraged a swift return to normal order, including Qatar, Turkey, Germany, France, Spain, the European Union and the United States. Greece supported Saied's move, with its foreign minister backing "Tunisia’s efforts to maintain the North African country’s stability from the influence of extremists".

Egypt, Saudi Arabia and the United Arab Emirates were also supportive, with influential voices in the three countries celebrating the coup as a "blow to political Islam". Officially, there was no reaction from Egypt and the UAE while Saudi Arabia declared support for "everything that would help achieve" security, stability and prosperity for Tunisia. The Arab League issued a statement urging Tunisia to "restore stability and calm and the state’s ability to work effectively to respond to the aspirations and requirements of the people".

A spokesman for Secretary-General of the United Nations António Guterres called on both sides to "exercise restraint, refrain from violence and ensure that the situation remains calm". The International Monetary Fund offered to continue assisting the country with the fallout of the COVID-19 pandemic. Tunisia had requested a three-year $4 billion loan "to help stabilise its balance of payments position after its current account deficit widened to 7.1 percent of GDP last year."

Amnesty International asked the government to "publicly commit to respecting and protecting human rights, including the rights to freedom of expression, association and peaceful assembly". Human Rights Watch said that the Saied's move implicitly revoked the constitutional order and that it was a first step towards authoritarianism. Russian political scientist Andrey Korotayev described the self-coup as a constitutional coupvolution, as it came in response to widespread protests demanding good governance.

== Legality ==
Saied justified his decision to adopt the measures by invoking Article 80 of the Tunisian constitution, which allows the president to take extraordinary measures if the nation's institutions, security or independence are threatened. However, the constitution states that the parliament should remain in "a state of continuous session" throughout the period of the extraordinary measures, and does not permit its suspension. Additionally, the constitution mandates that such measures be taken after consultation with the prime minister and Speaker of Parliament, which Saied claims to have done by phone. However, Ghannouchi denied that he was consulted.

== Subsequent developments ==
=== Protests ===
Outside the parliament building, clashes broke out between pro- and anti-Saied protestors. The day after the coup, Saied imposed a month-long curfew prohibiting the movement of people and cars between cities as well as public gatherings of more than three people. In spite of an official ban, sporadic protests against Saied continued into March 2023.

In January 2022, a protester died of wounds he sustained during a crackdown on protests by security forces.

At the beginning of October 2024, the day before the presidential election, some demonstrations took place in Tunis; the demonstrators called for a boycott of the election.

=== Changes to the political system ===
On 24 August 2021, Saied announced the extension of the extraordinary measures "until further notice". On 22 September 2021, he announced that he would rule by decree and suspend constitutional provisions that go against the extraordinary measures. He also announced his intention to appoint a committee to draft amendments to the constitution, and said that members of parliament will no longer receive their salaries.

On 29 September 2021, two months after the coup, Saied appointed Najla Bouden to the premiership. Although this made her the first female prime minister in Tunisia and in the Arab World, she has been criticised as no more than a figurehead.

On 20 March 2022, Saied dissolved the Parliament, which had been frozen for eight months, after members arranged an online session in which they voted against Saied's extraordinary measures.

On 30 June 2022, Saied unveiled a draft for a new constitution, which introduced sweeping changes and increased the power of the presidency at the expense of the legislature, which he split into two chambers, and the judiciary. The draft was criticised as undemocratic. A referendum to approve the draft, held on 25 July 2022, the first anniversary of the coup, saw 94.6% of valid ballots approving the draft, but turnout was only 30.5% after most of the opposition called for a boycott.

=== Legal proceedings against opposition figures ===
Since 25 July 2021, a number of parliamentarians and activists have been prosecuted for denouncing the president's actions. On 30 July 2021, Yassin Ayari, a member of parliament and a critic of Saied, was arrested at his house by security forces. On 17 September 2021, Seifeddine Makhlouf, another parliamentarian, was arrested. He was later sentenced by a military court to 14 months in prison.

On 31 December 2021, Noureddine Bhiri, deputy head of Ennahda, was arrested over accusations of terrorism. On 2 January 2022, he was transferred to a hospital after going on hunger strike. The United Nations condemned the arrest, as did Human Rights Watch. He was released in March 2022. However, he was arrested again on 13 February 2023.

Ennahda leader Rached Ghannouchi has been summoned by courts several times including in July 2022 and November 2022 for money laundering, and in February 2023 for "inciting Tunisians to kill each other". Ghannouchi has denied the allegations, insisting that they are meant to divert attention from "the real problems".

On 3 October 2023, Abir Moussi, leader of the opposition Free Destourian Party was arrested on the gates of the Carthage Palace while trying to get legal documents from the registry office of the presidency of the republic, two days later a judge ordered her imprisonment; she has since been in the women's prison in Mannouba. Two weeks later, thousands took to the streets of Tunis to denounce her arrest. According to a public letter from Abir Moussi, she suffers from degrading treatment and from severe pain in many parts of her body due to her being physically assaulted by policemen during her arrest. Moussi accused the prison's authorities of refusing to treat her, limiting their reaction to just giving her some sedatives.

=== Erosion of judicial independence ===
Since the coup, several judges have been banned from travelling or placed under house arrest without approval from the Supreme Judicial Council. The council, which was tasked with ensuring judicial independence and disciplining judges, was dissolved by Saied on 6 February 2022.

On 1 June 2022, Saied dismissed 57 judges and prosecutors for alleged corruption and "hindering the pursuit of those suspected in terrorism cases". Despite a court order in August that ruled in favour of reinstating 49 of those dismissed, the Saied-appointed justice minister announced the preparation of criminal cases against the dismissed judges, drawing criticism from Human Rights Watch.

=== Restrictions on the media ===
On 26 July 2021, Tunisian police raided the bureau of Al Jazeera in Tunis without warrants or prior notification. The Euro-Mediterranean Human Rights Monitor and Journalists for Human Rights have documented several restrictions imposed on journalists since the coup. The violations documented included illegal censorship, repression, arbitrary detention, and security and judicial prosecution.

== See also ==
- 2021 Tunisian protests
- 2025 Tunisian protests
- Political impact of the COVID-19 pandemic
