= Hichem Mechichi =

Tunisian politician (born 1974)

- هشام المشيشي
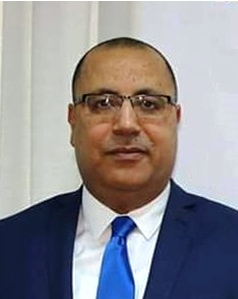
- Mechichi in 2020

Prime Minister of Tunisia
- In office 2 September 2020 – 25 July 2021
- President: Kais Saied
- Preceded by: Elyes Fakhfakh
- Succeeded by: Najla Bouden

Minister of Interior
- In office 27 February 2020 – 2 September 2020
- Prime Minister: Elyes Fakhfakh
- Preceded by: Hichem Fourati
- Succeeded by: Taoufik Charfeddine

Personal details
- Born: January 1974 (age 52) Tunis, Tunisia
- Party: Independent
- Education: Tunis El Manar University; École nationale d'administration de Tunis; École nationale d'administration de Strasbourg

Hichem Mechichi (Arabic: هشام المشيشي, romanized: Hišām al-Mašīšī; born January 1974) is a Tunisian politician who served as the Prime Minister of Tunisia from September 2020 to July 2021, when he was unconstitutionally dismissed by President Kais Saied in a coup whereby he monopolized all state powers. He held the post of Minister of the Interior in 2020 before being appointed head of government.

== Education ==
Hichem Mechichi holds a master's degree in law from the faculty of law and political science from Tunis El Manar University, and a master's degree in law, political science and public administration from École nationale d'administration. He is also a former student of National School of Administration of France (ENA) of the Republic promotion (2005–2007). The institution paying tribute to him via its website after his appointment as head of government.

== Career ==
Mechichi was a member of the National Commission of Investigation on Corruption and Embezzlement, founded in 2011 and chaired by Abdelfattah Amor. In 2014, he was appointed Chief of Staff at the Ministry of Transport, then the same post successively at the ministries of Social Affairs and Public Health.

He was then Director General of the National Agency for the Sanitary and Environmental Control of Products.

Appointed by President Kaïs Saïed as his first adviser in charge of Legal Affairs, on 11 February 2020, he was appointed on the 27 of the same month as Minister of the Interior in the government of Elyes Fakhfakh.

=== Prime minister ===
On 25 July 2020, in the midst of a political crisis, Saïed appointed Mechichi head of government, with the task of forming a government in one month and obtaining the confidence of the Assembly of the Representatives of the People. Later on, he assumed office on 2 September 2020.

He tested positive for COVID-19 during the pandemic on 25 June 2021.

After a series of protests, the Tunisian president dismissed Mechichi as prime minister on 25 July.

Political offices
Preceded by Elyes Fakhfakh	Prime Minister of Tunisia; 2020–2021	Succeeded by Najla Bouden
