= Capital punishment in Tunisia =

Capital punishment is a legal penalty in Tunisia. Despite its legality, no executions have been carried out since 1990. Tunisia is classified as "Abolitionist in Practice."

== History ==
Beylic of Tunis (1705–1801)

The Beylic of Tunis was an independent state located in present-day Tunisia. The country had a traditional law system under sharia, and they followed Muslim practices. The death penalty was able to be sought by victims of certain crimes laid out in the Qur'an. During the Beylic of Tunis, the two common forms of execution were beheadings and hangings.

On June 24, 1857, Samuel "Batto" Sfez was beheaded in Beylic of Tunis. Batto was a Jewish-Tunisian man who had worked as a cart driver. In 1856, Batto ran over and killed a Muslim child. Despite efforts by the Jewish community, Muhammad Bey issued the order to have Batto beheaded.

The beheading brought international attention as the Jewish and Christian communities sought help from the French and British consulates. The French sent navy ships to pressure Muhammad Bey to make reforms to the legal system. This led to him agreeing to the Fundamental Pact, which promised religious freedom, equality in the legal system, and reformed the tax system to be equal for all citizens.

French protectorate of Tunisia (1881–1956)

In 1881, the Khroumir tribe in Tunisia began to raid surrounding areas, including Algeria which was controlled by France. They responded to the Khroumir raid by sending French troops into the heart of Tunis. The Bey of Tunis, Muhammad III as-Sadiq decided that they would need to sign a treaty with France to resolve the conflict, which led to the signing of the Treaty of Bardo. The treaty gave aspects of the Tunisian state over to France, and led to large reforms in education, government structure, and economics.

In regards to capital punishment, the French also changed the court system and law structure to reflect their colonial power. Under the French protectorate, people in Tunisia pushed to resist the colonial control and organized resistance groups. The French response to these resistance groups were often imprisonment, forced labor, and even exiling people from Tunisia. Although some cases, especially regarding violent resistance groups, the courts would hand out death sentences to members. Public executions included the guillotine or shootings.

In the 1950s, the French went after members of Neo Destour who were Tunisian Nationalists. France made the decision to mass arrest a large portion of the group after several conflicts between Neo Destour and the French army. They held military tribunals, and several members were executed by the French. These actions led to a lot of international attention and as the Tunisian Nationalists gained sympathy, the French decided to negotiate leaving the country of Tunisia.

Republic of Tunisia (1957–2011)

On March 20, 1956, Tunisia gained independence from France. Habib Bourguiba, a leader in the Neo Destour party led the country to abolish the monarchy on July 25, 1957. They established The Republic of Tunisia and Habib Bourguiba became its first president. Bourguiba focused on reforming the Tunisian state by removing Islamic fundamentalism, increasing economic stability and opportunity, and increasing women's rights. In 1975, Bourguiba was named President for Life, and held control of the state until a coup by his Prime Minister Zine El Abidine Ben Ali, in 1987.

Capital punishment was continued under this regime, but was rarely carried out. The death penalty was handed out to crimes like murder, terrorism, and treason. In 1991, the last execution in Tunisia occurred when Naceur Damergi was hanged. Damergi was nicknamed "The Butcher of Nabeul" as he kidnapped, raped, and murdered fourteen minors in Tunisia.

== Modern Tunisia ==
Although the death penalty is still on the books in Tunisia, no executions have occurred since 1991. Tunisia has voted in favor of a moratorium on executions with the ultimate goal of abolishing the death penalty.

Courts in Tunisia handed down at least three new death sentences in 2021. There was believed to have been at least 89 people on death row in Tunisia at the end of 2021.

In September 2020, the President of Tunisia supported reinstating executions in the country, which was criticized by human rights organizations.

In October 2025, a 56-year-old man from the coastal city of Nabeul was sentenced to death for posting content criticizing president Kais Saied and state agencies, drawing national and international outcry.
