= 2021 Tunisian protests =

January–July anti-government protests

- Part of 2018–2022 Arab protests
- Date: 15 January 2021 – 25 July 2021 (6 months, 1 week and 3 days)
- Location: Several cities in Tunisia, mainly working-class neighborhoods in Tunis, Sousse, Bizerte, Menzel Bourguiba, Nabeul, Kasserine, Siliana and others.
- Caused by: Economic crisis, unemployment, corruption, police brutality, government mishandling of the COVID-19 pandemic
- Methods: Rioting, looting, arson, robbery, assault
- Result: Shops, vehicles destroyed, banks looted, 2021 Tunisian self-coup

Reported injuries
- Death: 1
- Arrested: 1000+

The 2021 Tunisian protests were a series of protests that started on 15 January 2021. Thousand of people rioted in cities and towns across Tunisia, which saw looting and arson as well as mass deployment of police and army in several cities and the arrest of hundreds of demonstrators.

The protests started in the town of Siliana, northwestern Tunisia, following the municipal police aggression of a shepherd.

Young people clashed with police for the fifth straight night on 19 January. In response, Prime Minister Hichem Mechichi appealed to the protesters on national television, stating “Your voice is heard, and your anger is legitimate, and it is my role and the role of the government to work to realize your demands and to make the dream of Tunisia to become true.”

On 21 January, Tunisia reported 103 COVID-19–related deaths, the highest figure to date in the country, among the highest rates in Africa. On 23 January, the government extended its health curfew and banned demonstrations. Travel between regions was banned, bars and restaurants were closed except for take-out food, and university classes were transferred online.

== See also ==
- 2021 in North Africa
- COVID-19 pandemic in Tunisia
- June 2013 Egyptian protests
- 2025 Tunisian protests
