= Naceur Damergi =

Tunisian serial killer

- Born: 1944; Tunis, French Tunisia
- Died: 17 November 1990 (aged 45–46); Nador Prison, Tunis, Tunisia
- Cause of death: Execution by hanging
- Other name: Slaughterer of Nabeul
- Convictions: Murder (x14); Rape
- Penalty: Death

Details
- Victims: 14
- Span of crimes: 1987–1988
- Country: Tunisia
- Date apprehended: 27 November 1989

Naceur Damergi (Arabic: الناصر الدامرجي), known as The Butcher of Nabeul or Mohamed Aziz Ibrahim Jed (Arabic: سفاح نابل; 1944–17 November 1990), was a Tunisian serial killer who kidnapped, raped, and murdered fourteen minors in Nabeul, Tunisia, in the 1980s. He was the last person to be executed in Tunisia.

== Biography ==
=== Early life ===
Damergi, the illegitimate son of a young man from the Zaghouan countryside and a prostitute called Houria who was imprisoned for soliciting him, Damergi was born at Hospital Charles Nicolle in Tunis during the French occupation of Tunisia. After leaving prison, she married a farmer and registered her son in his name. Damergi did not meet his biological father for thirty years.

He was described as intelligent by the doctors and psychiatrists who treated him, as well as being fluent in French. During his childhood, he studied at the Bourguiba Children's School and then interrupted his education to work in the agriculture business where he thrived financially. He travelled to France in 1964 after he got engaged to his cousin; when he returned in 1968, he discovered that his fiancée had married another man.

=== Crimes ===
Damergi's first victim was a child named Muhammad Ali; on 15 June 1987, he offered to pay Ali to help him harvest almond fruits on his farm. As they were climbing the tree, Damergi expressed a desire to rape Ali, who refused and tried to escape. Damergi covered his mouth with one hand to prevent him from screaming and pressed his other hand on his neck until he died; believing Ali had fainted, Damergi put him to bed for six hours, eventually burying him on the farm when he realized he had died.

Without committing any further crimes until February 1988, Damergi subsequently honed his formula of luring children onto his farm to rape and murder them. By the time of his arrest, he had murdered fourteen victims ranging in age from 10 to 18 years. One notable victim was his ex-fiancée's 13-year-old son Ramzi, whom he mutilated with a sharp object before murdering him on 26 January 1988. This was the primary offence for which he was convicted.

=== Arrest and execution ===
Before Damergi's apprehension, many suspects were arrested, including Naceur himself; he was released due to lack of evidence. He was arrested a second time on 27 November 1989. Lawyers in Tunisia refused to defend him, so the court assigned a lawyer to defend him.

After his request for clemency was denied by president Zine el-Abidine Ben Ali, Damergi was executed by hanging at 3:15 a.m. on 17 November 1990 at Nador Prison, Tunis. Am Hassen, his executioner, remembered in a 2013 interview with Leaders magazine that Damergi took thirteen minutes to die, rather than the common four or five.

=== Legacy ===
On 5 March 2013, after the Tunisian Revolution, the TV show Roufiat El Jalsa, broadcast on El Hiwar El Tounsi channel, aired two episodes about the case, featuring some of the victims’ families, forensic doctors, psychologists, lawyers for the perpetrator, and eyewitnesses. However, the perpetrator's lawyer stated in the program that his agent had been in a traffic accident that caused a concussion of 30%, and that he had severe mental disorders and was in a state of permanent isolation.

== See also ==
- List of serial killers by country
- List of serial killers by number of victims
