= Ayachi Hammami =

Tunisian politician

- العياشي الهمامي
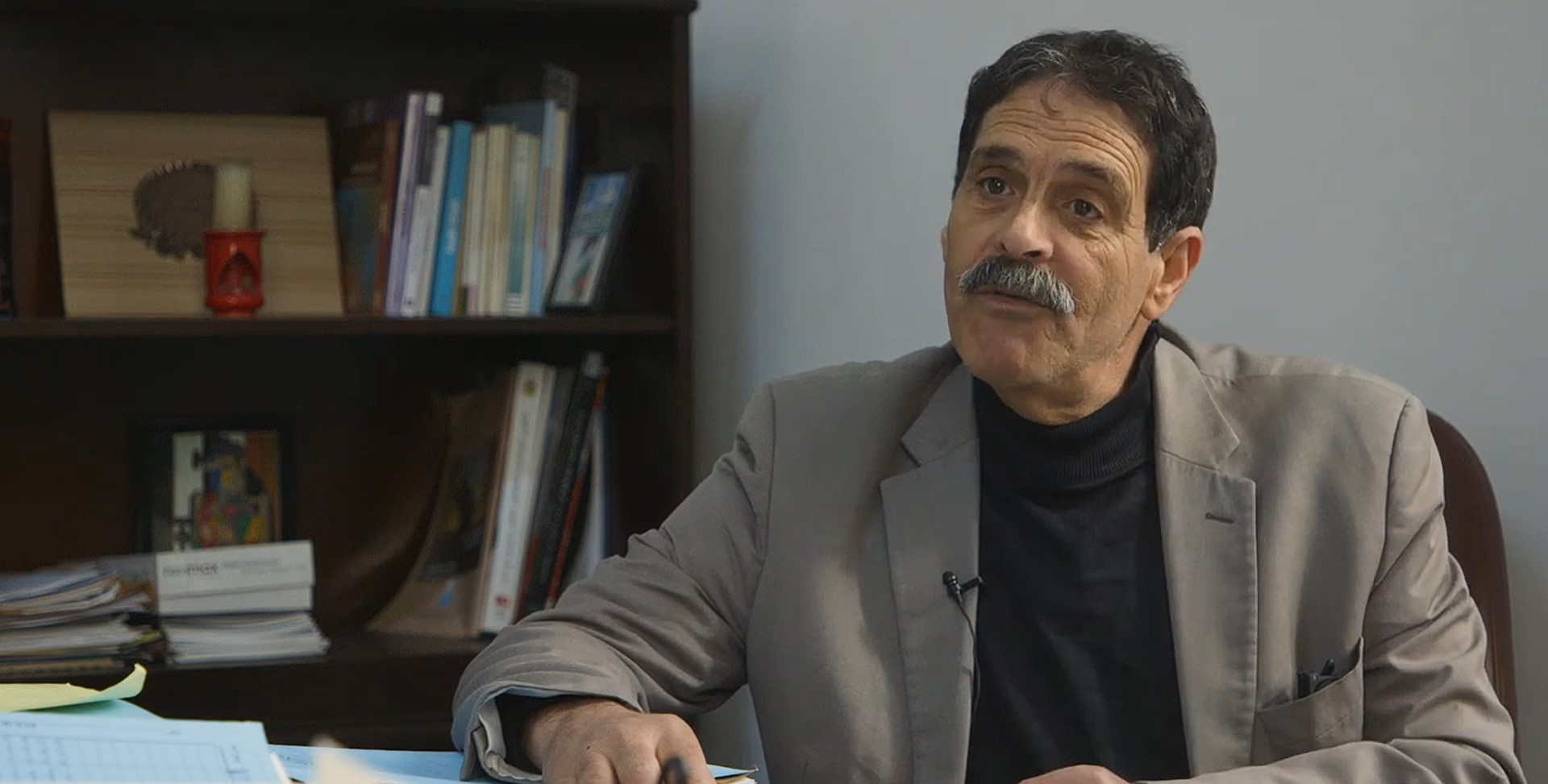
- Hammami in his office in 2023

Tunisian Minister for Human Rights and Relations with Constitutional Bodies and Civil Society
- In office 27 February 2020 – 2 September 2020
- President: Kais Saïed
- Prime Minister: Elyes Fakhfakh
- Succeeded by: Thouraya Jeribi Khémiri

Personal details
- Born: 1959 (age 66–67)
- Party: Independent
- Profession: Lawyer

Ayachi Hammami (Arabic: العياشي الهمامي; born 1959) is a Tunisian lawyer and human rights defender. He has played a significant role in Tunisia’s legal, political, and civil society landscape, particularly in defense, of human rights, judicial independence, the rule of law and political plurality . Hammami was a board member of leading national and international human rights organizations. Hammami served as a government minister in 2020. He was a central figure in opposing the dismantlement of the rule of law and independence of the judiciary after Kais Saied's coup in Tunisia on 25 July 2021. On 2 December 2025 he was arrested to enforce a prison sentence in a politically motivated prosecution widely criticized by international rights groups.

== Early activism and career ==
Ayachi Hammami became involved in union activism in the late 1970s while working as a school teacher. He was dismissed from his teaching position due to his militant activities. He later pursued a career in law and became a lawyer in the mid-1990s.

Hammami practiced as an independent lawyer without party affiliation. He became known for his involvement in professional struggles within the Tunisian Bar Association and for his participation in national and regional human rights organizations. Under the dictatorship of former president Zine El Abidine Ben Ali, he endured sustained forms of reprisal and intimidation because of his activism. During that period, he served as Secretary General of a section of the Tunisian League for the Defence of Human Rights (LTDH) and later as a member of its executive committee, as well as the executive committee of Euromed Rights.

== Human rights advocacy under Zine el-Abidine Ben Ali ==
During the presidency of Zine El Abidine Ben Ali, Hammami defended victims of human rights violations, political prisoners, and trade unionists. In April 2005, following the arrest of lawyer Mohamed Abbou because of a critical article that he published, Ayachi Hammami initiated a sit-in of 10 lawyers that lasted nearly two months at the headquarters of the Bar Association. A few months later, as the World Summit on the Information Society (scheduled to take place in Tunis in November 2005) approached, Ayachi Hammami opened his office to seven other activists for a month-long hunger strike. This highly publicized action led to the creation of the October 18 Coalition for Rights and Freedoms. The 18 October Coalition demands were centered around human rights demands: liberation of arbitrarily detained political prisoners, freedom of expression, association and assembly, freedom of the press.

Targeted by increasing pressure, Hammami's law office was set on fire in 2007.

== After the 2011 revolution ==
Following the Tunisian revolution, Hammami was a member of the Higher Authority for the Realisation of the Objectives of the Revolution, Political Reform, and Democratic Transition. He contributed to drafting Decree 88 on associations, which redefined the legal framework for civil society organizations in Tunisia. In 2019, he was nominated by four parliamentary groups for election to the Constitutional Court, although the court was never established.

== Minister of Human Rights (2020) ==
From March to August 2020, Hammami served as Minister of Human Rights. During his tenure, he supported the transitional justice process, including the publication of the Truth and Dignity Commission’s final report in the Official Journal of the Tunisian Republic.

== Activities after 2021 ==
After President Kais Saied’s suspension of parliament and consolidation of executive power on 25 July 2021, Hammami publicly opposed the measures, describing them as unconstitutional and warning against the erosion of the rule of law and judicial independence. In June 2022, following a presidential decree allowing the dismissal of judges without due process, he coordinated and served as spokesperson for a defense committee representing 57 judges and prosecutors who were summarily dismissed.

In 2022, he founded the National Committee for the Defence of Freedoms and Democracy (NCDFD), a human rights organization focused on documenting violations, defending political detainees, supporting judicial independence, and advocating for the restoration of democratic governance.

In January 2023, Hammami was charged under Article 24 of Decree-Law 54-2022 in connection with statements he made during a radio interview in his capacity as a defense lawyer. The investigation was initiated following instructions from the Ministry of Justice and remained open.

In May 2023, Hammami was added as a suspect in the high-profile “conspiracy against the state” case, in which he had initially acted as a defense lawyer for detained opposition figures. He was charged with “joining a terrorist organization” and “failing to report terrorist activity,” placed under a travel ban, and restricted from appearing in public spaces. The trial, which began in 2025, was marked by procedural controversies, including the use of remote hearings for detained defendants and the absence of defense pleadings. On 19 April 2025, Hammami was convicted and sentenced to imprisonment. The conviction was upheld on appeal on 28 November 2025. His arrest to enforce the sentence took place on 2 December 2025.

The proceedings were criticized by national and international human rights organizations and United Nations experts, who raised concerns about fair trial guarantees.
