= Kais Saied =

President of Tunisia since 2019

His Excellency Kaïs Saïed
- قيس سعيد
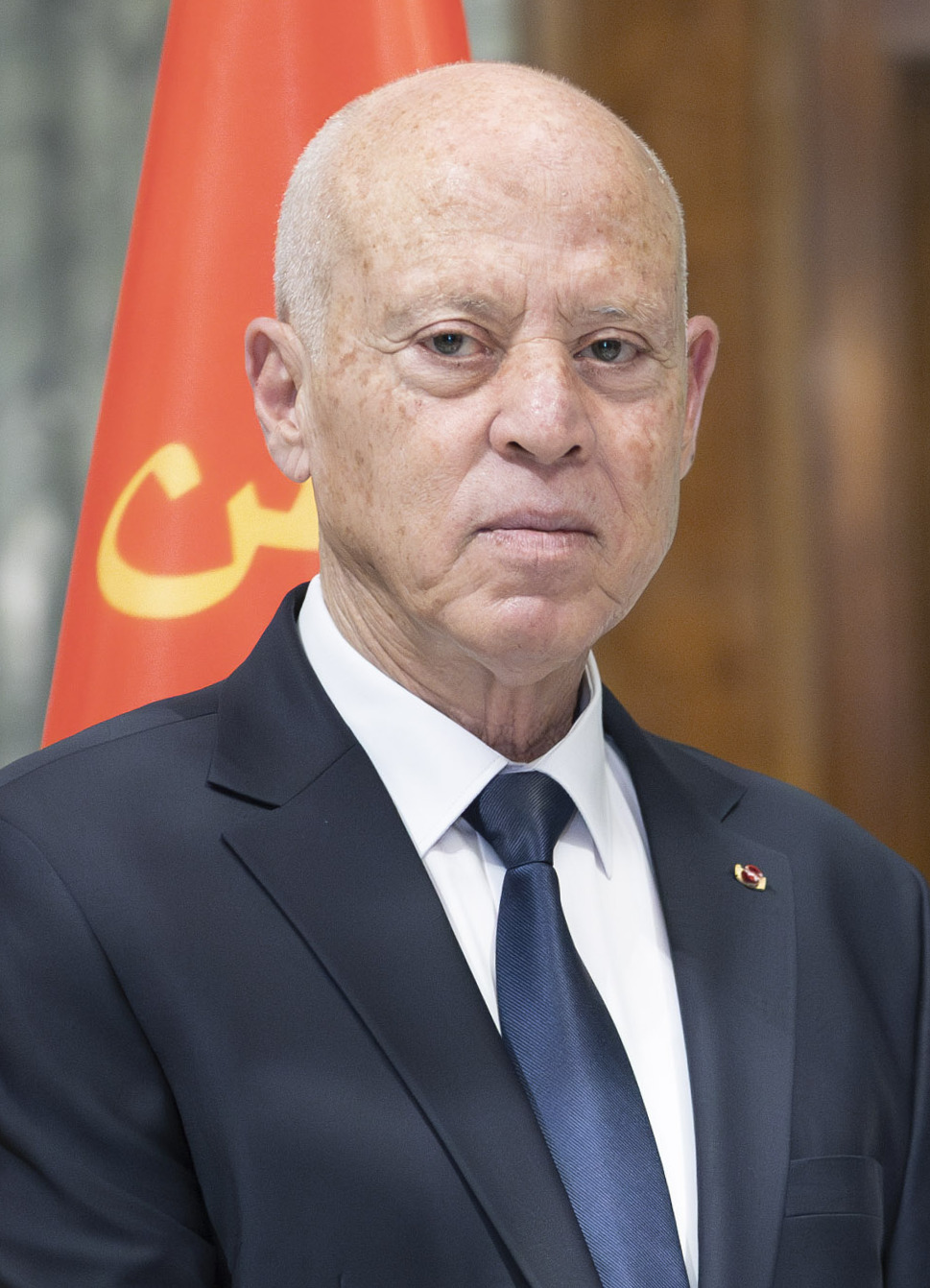
- Saied in 2023

5th President of Tunisia
- Incumbent
- Assumed office 23 October 2019
- Prime Minister: See list: Youssef Chahed; Elyes Fakhfakh; Hichem Mechichi; Najla Bouden; Ahmed Hachani; Kamel Madouri; Sara Zaafarani
- Preceded by: Mohamed Ennaceur (acting)

Personal details
- Born: 22 February 1958 (age 68) Tunis, Tunisia
- Party: Independent
- Spouse: Ichraf Chebil
- Children: 3
- Education: University of Tunis; International Institute of Humanitarian Law
- Profession: Jurist; lecturer in law

Kaïs Saïed (Arabic: قَيْس سُعَيِّد, romanized: Qays Suʿayyid; born 22 February 1958) is a Tunisian politician, jurist and former assistant professor of law who has served as the fifth president of Tunisia since 2019. He was president of the Tunisian Association of Constitutional Law from 1995 to 2019.

Having worked in various legal and academic roles since the 1980s, Saied joined the 2019 presidential election as an independent social conservative with a populist anti-corruption platform supported by Ennahda and others across the political spectrum. He won the second round of the election with 72.71% of the vote, defeating Nabil Karoui, and was sworn in as president on 23 October 2019.

As president, Saied has overseen democratic backsliding, as he has repressed the political opposition and dissidents in Tunisia. In January 2021, protests began in response to alleged police brutality, economic hardship and the COVID-19 pandemic. On 25 July 2021, Saied dismissed the parliament and Prime Minister Hichem Mechichi, executing a successful self-coup. Since then, Saied oversaw the dismissal of the judiciary and arrest of his main political opposition figures.

He ruled by decree until he was successful in passing a new constitution which granted him more powers and called snap legislative elections. He was re-elected president for a second term in October 2024.

== Early life ==
Kais Saied is the son of Moncef Saied and Zakia Bellagha from Béni Khiar (Cap Bon). His paternal uncle, Hicham Saïed, was the first pediatric surgeon in Tunisia, known for having separated two conjoined twins in the 1970s. Saïed completed his secondary studies at Sadiki College.

== Professional career ==
A jurist by training, Saied is a specialist in constitutional law, and secretary-general of the Tunisian Association of Constitutional Law between 1990 and 1995, then vice-president of the association since 1995.

He was the director of the public law department at the University of Sousse between 1994 and 1999, then at the University of Carthage from 1999 to 2018. He was a member of the group of experts of the General Secretariat of the Arab League between 1989 and 1990, expert at the Arab Institute for Human Rights from 1993 to 1995 and a member of the committee of experts responsible for revising the draft Tunisian Constitution in 2014. He was also a member of the scientific council of several commissions academics.

In 2013, while a visiting professor at several Arab universities, he refused to be part of the commission of experts whose mission was to find a legal solution to the problem of the Independent High Authority for Elections. Saied retired in 2018.

== Political career ==
=== Political ascent ===
From 2013 to 2014, Kais Saied participated in several political clubs and meetings, which bring together young people. In 2016, the Mouassissoun movement was created to support Saied's action and projects.

=== 2019 presidential campaign ===
Saied was one of the first declared candidates in the 2019 Tunisian presidential election. Running as an independent social conservative, he had sought to appeal to younger voters. One of his policies included support for allowing citizens to recall their elected officials. Saied suggested to voters that many of Tunisia's current issues were due to "non-respect for many constitutional laws". He presented a plan to combat corruption, whether it is "moral or financial". Saied was supported by both Islamists and leftists. In a June 2019 interview with the newspaper Acharaâ Al Magharibi, Saied announced his support for the death penalty. He also made statements that public expression of homosexuality is financed and encouraged by foreign countries, telling the paper:

I was told certain houses were rented by foreign parties... homosexuality has existed throughout history, but certain people want to spread homosexuality.

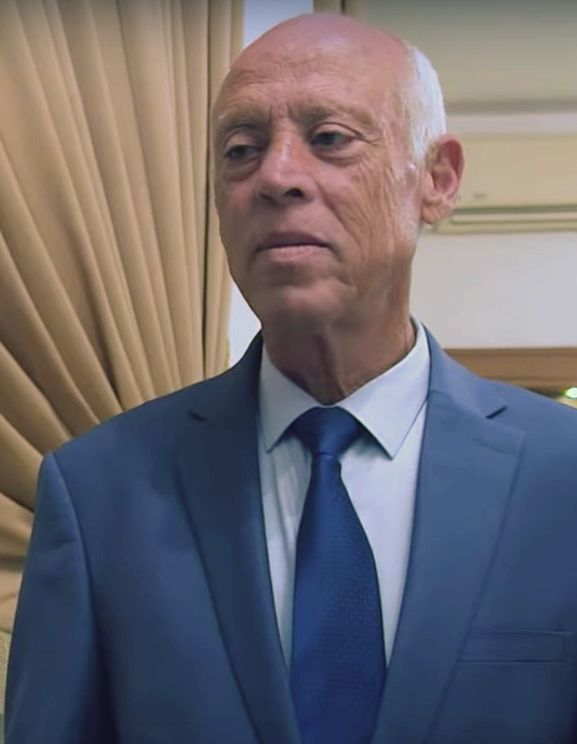
Saied during the 2019 presidential campaign, 14 September 2019.

Kais Saied is against normalisation of relations with Israel, saying that Israel is at war with the Muslim world, and any Muslim leader who normalizes his or her country's relationship with the Zionists should be tried for treason. He said his country has no problem with Jews and that Tunisians including his father protected Jews during the Second World War.

Saied has also stated that he is in favor of a decentralised, three-tier, indirect manner of electing national legislative representatives, some elements of direct democracy, and believes that local representatives should be elected based on character and its underlying structure rather than political ideology. Due to his relative obscurity and lack of campaigning, several of his positions were not well-defined aside from his social conservatism. Despite being supported by Ennahda in the election and holding socially conservative positions, Saied did not describe himself as an Islamist and had advisers from across the political spectrum. He also is not in favor of adding religious elements to the constitution, stating that these were only his personal beliefs.

Several media sources referred to Saied as "RoboCop", given his monotonous voice, his use of Standard Arabic rather than Tunisian dialect, and his focus on law and order issues. On his campaign trail, Saied portrayed himself as a man of the people, somewhat similarly to Nabil Karoui, another populist candidate. Saied came in first place in the first round of the 2019 Tunisian presidential election which took place on 15 September 2019, and moved on to face Karoui in the second round on 13 October, where Saied received 72.71% of the vote, thereby winning the election. The preliminary election results were announced on 14 October, and later confirmed on 17 October, making Saied the new president of Tunisia.

=== 2024 presidential campaign ===
In July 2024, Saied announced that he would run for another presidential term in the 2024 Tunisian presidential election, scheduled on 6 October. On 7 October, the electoral authority announced that Saied was re-elected president of Tunisia with 90.69% of the vote. He was inaugurated for his second term on 21 October.

== President of Tunisia ==
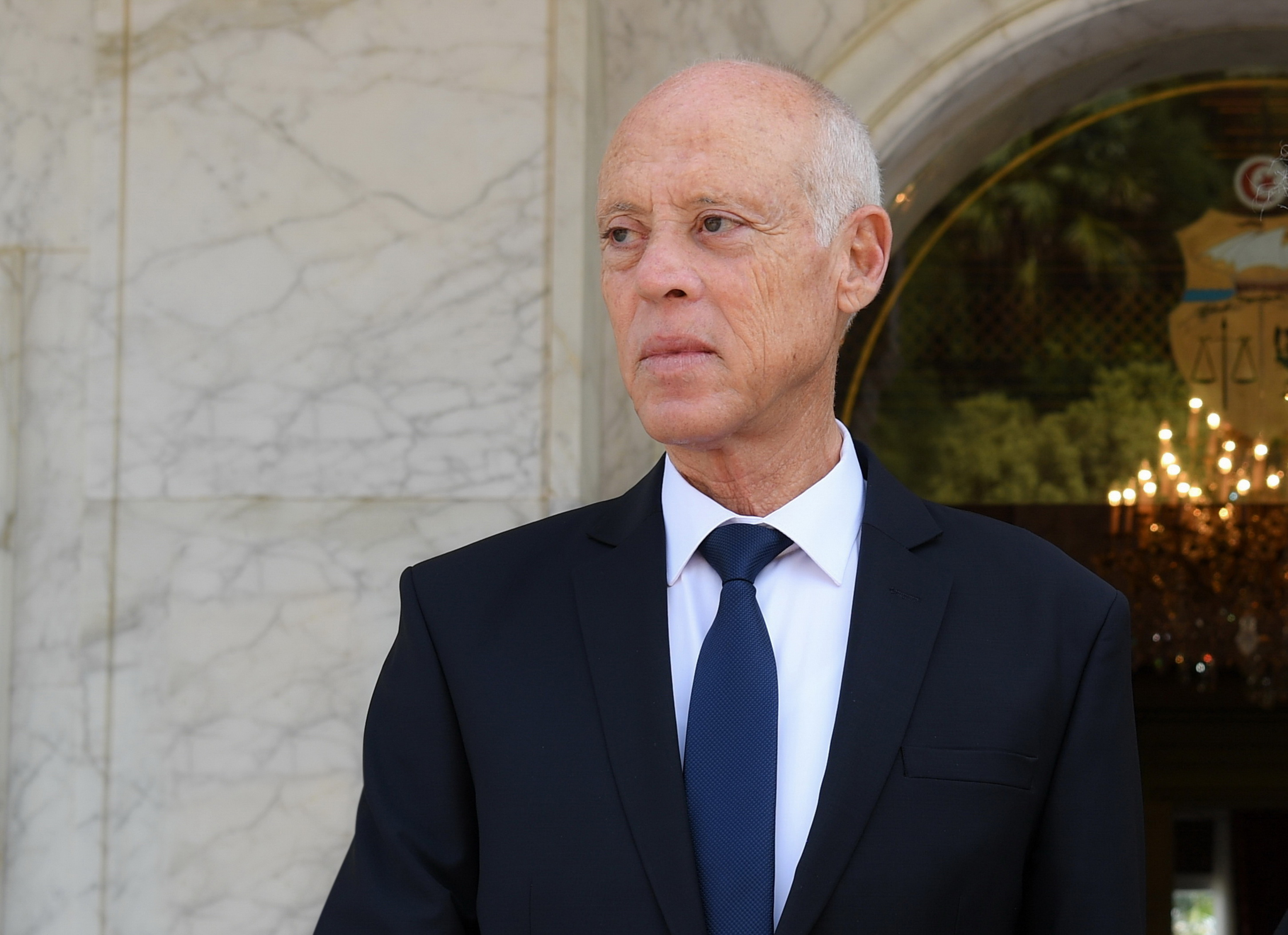
Kaïs Saied at Carthage Palace, 23 October 2019

Saied was sworn in as Tunisia's president on 23 October 2019, becoming the first president born after the country's independence from France in 1956.

=== Transition and investiture ===
The results of the presidential election were announced by the Independent High Authority for Elections on 17 October. On the same day, Kaïs Saïed chose his brother Naoufel, also a professor of constitutional law, to appoint the advisers and members of the presidential cabinet. The office of the Assembly of the Representatives of the People met on 18 October and fixed the oath on 23 October. This date corresponds to the maximum duration of the presidential interim of 90 days.

Saied took his oath before the outgoing Assembly on 23 October, at the Presidential Palace of Carthage, during which he promised to fight against terrorism and its causes, as well as to guarantee the gains of Tunisian women, while strengthening economic and social rights. He later met with the interim president, Mohamed Ennaceur, who transferred presidential powers to Saied.

=== First steps ===
Saied refused to stay at the presidential palace in Carthage, preferring his villa in Mnihla, located in the governorate of Ariana. On 30 October, he appointed diplomat Tarek Bettaïeb as head of the presidential cabinet, General Mohamed Salah Hamdi as national security adviser, with Tarek Hannachi leading the protocol. Abderraouf Bettaïeb was appointed Minister-Advisor to the President of the Republic, Rachida Ennaifer was put in charge of communication, while Nadia Akacha became responsible for legal affairs.

=== Government formation ===
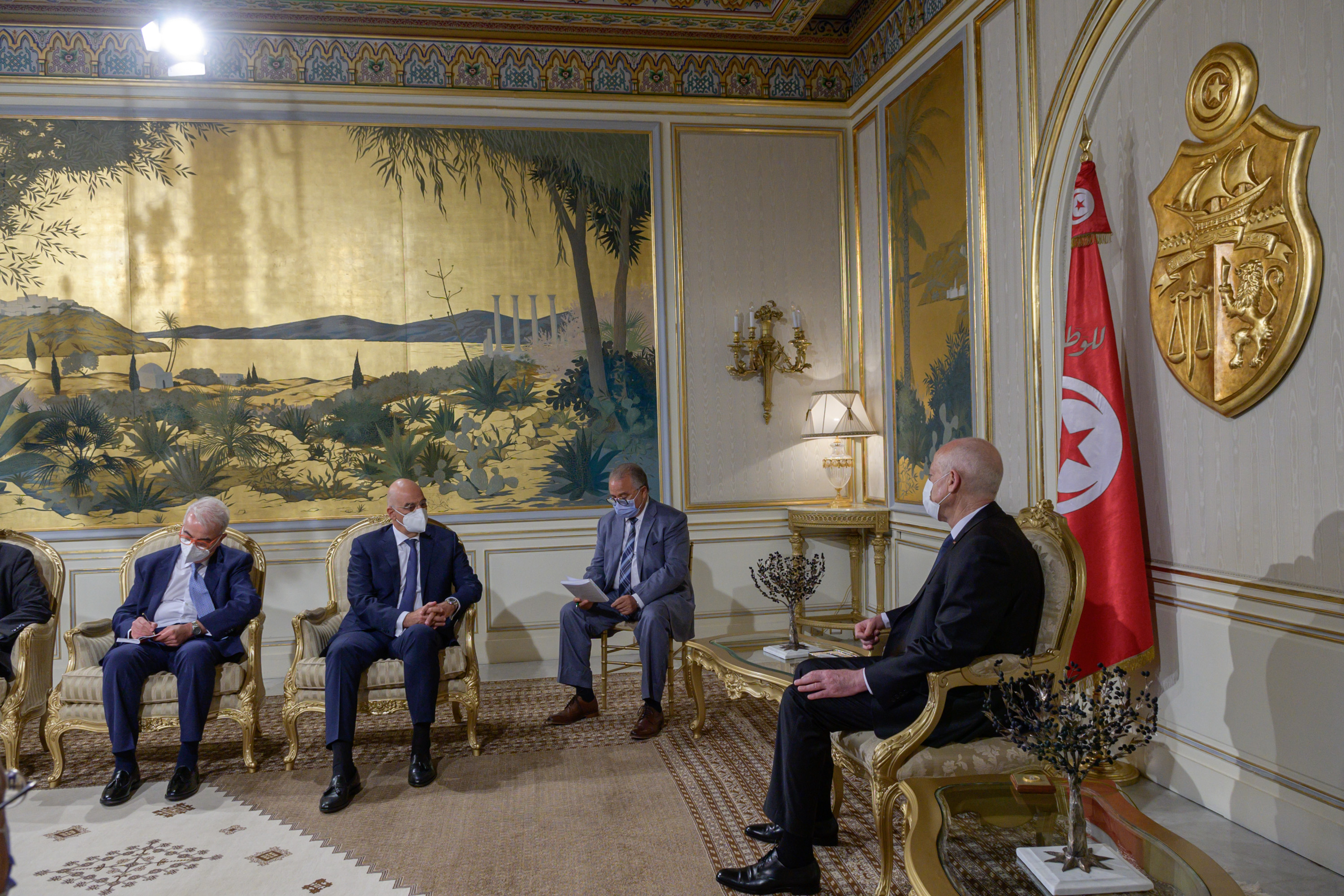
Kaïs Saied in a diplomatic meeting at the Carthage Palace, 7 September 2021

The government being semi-presidential, Kais Saied had a week after his inauguration to instruct the party which took the lead in the legislative elections to form a government. The latter then has a month to obtain the confidence of the Assembly of People's Representatives. On 15 November 2019, Saied appointed Habib Jemli, the candidate for Ennahda, to the post of head of government and charged him with forming a cabinet. On 10 January 2020, the Assembly rejected the composition of the government, which was also subject to delays when it was announced. Saied therefore had ten days to appoint a new head of government. On 20 January 2020, he appointed Elyes Fakhfakh.

His government was announced on 15 February, but Ennahda, whose ministers were announced there, announced that he would not vote for confidence because of the non-participation of Heart of Tunisia. A slightly modified version of the government, but without the participation of Heart of Tunisia, was announced on 19 February; Ennahdha, fearing a dissolution, voted to accept the government. On 27 February, the Assembly of People's Representatives granted confidence to the government.

In June 2020, according to Al Jazeera, "an independent member of Parliament published documents indicating that Fakhfakh owned shares in companies that won deals worth 44 million dinars". Fakhfakh denied any wrongdoing. On 15 July 2020, he resigned. On 25 July 2020, Saïed appointed Hichem Mechichi who was the former interior minister as head of government, with the task of forming a government in one month and obtaining the confidence of the Assembly of the Representatives of the People. Later on, he assumed office on 2 September 2020.

=== 2021 self-coup ===
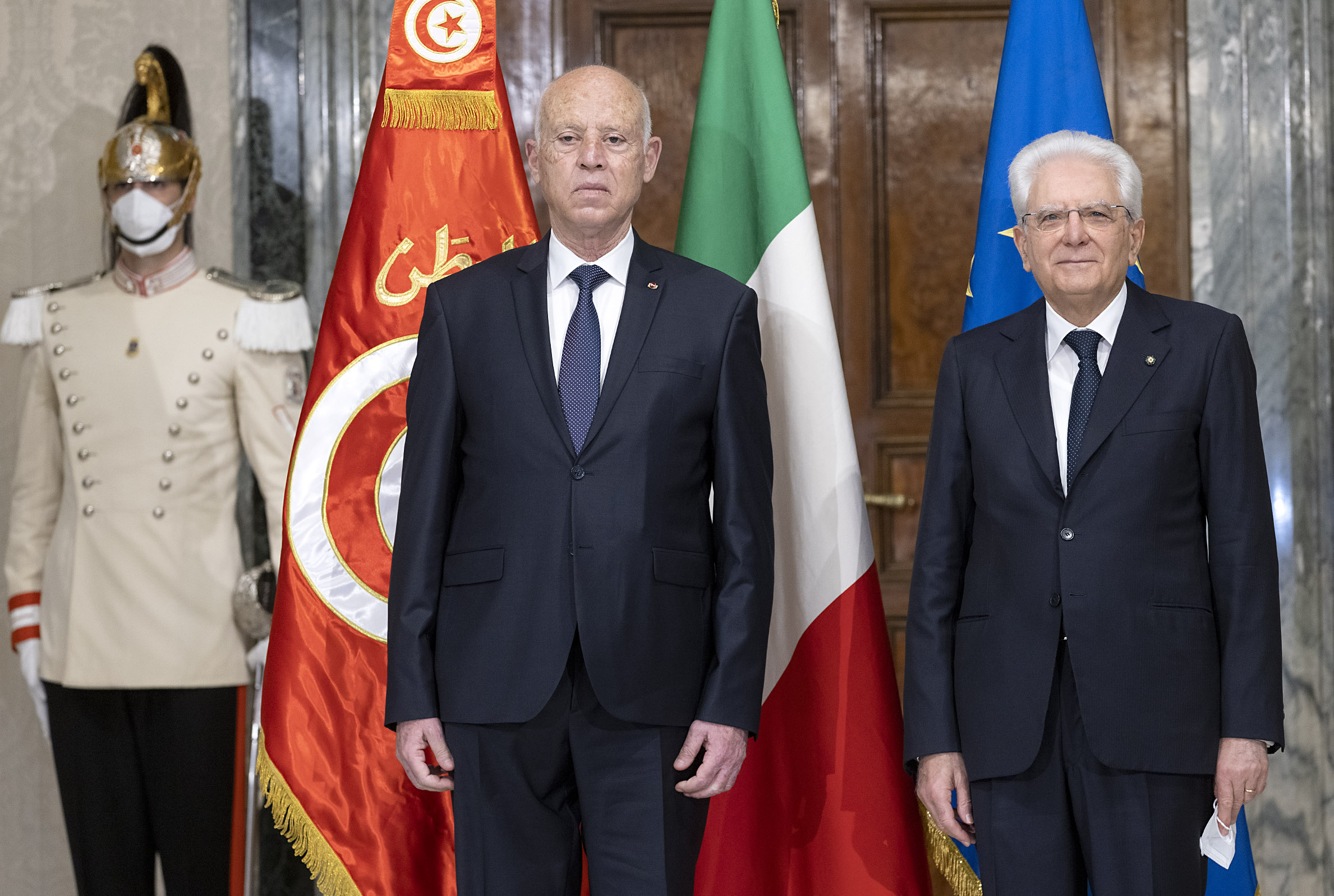
Saied with Italian president Sergio Mattarella at Quirinal Palace, 16 June 2021

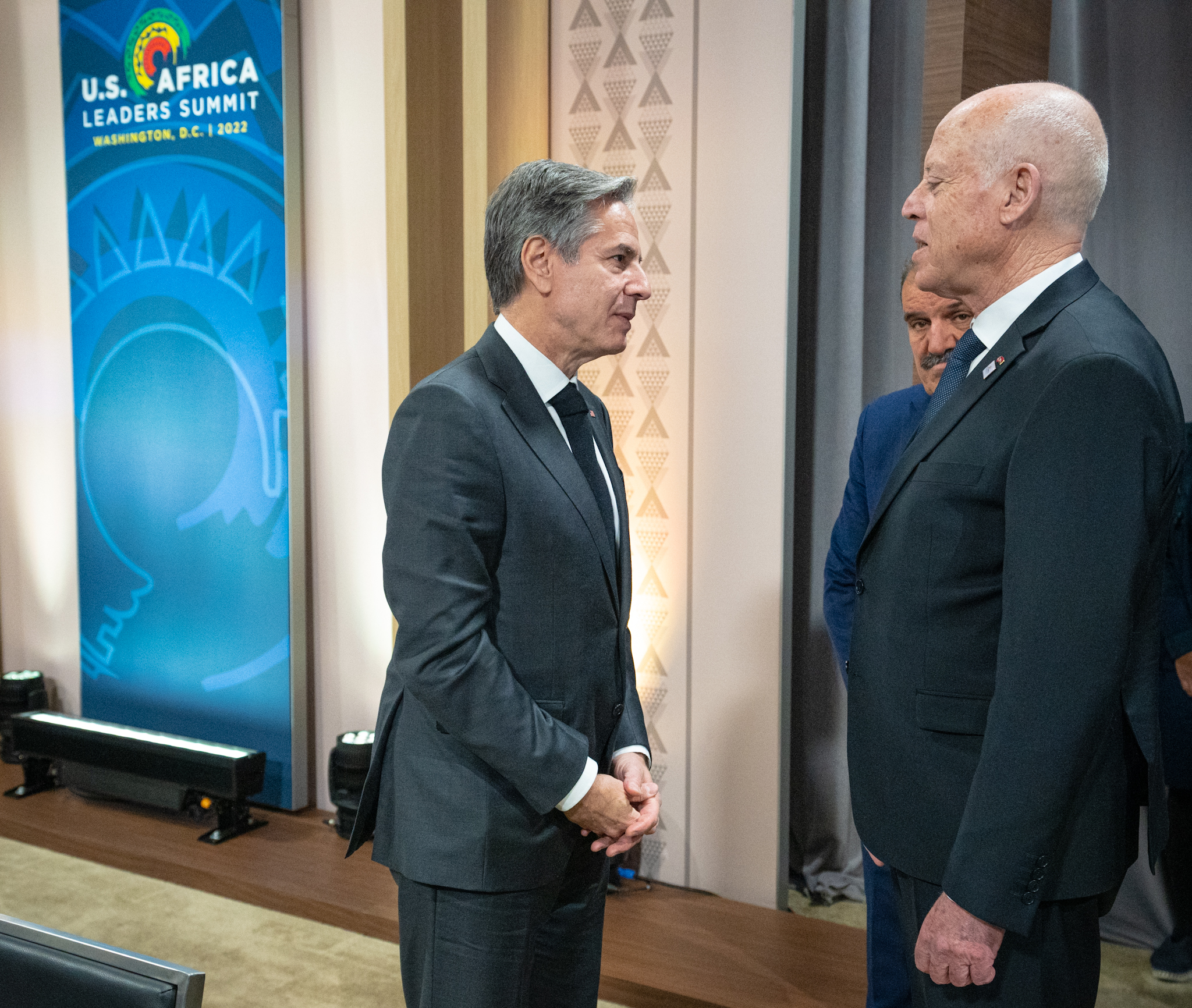
Saied with Secretary Antony Blinken in Washington, D.C., 22 December 2022

On 25 July 2021, in light of demonstrations against the government demanding the improvement of basic services and amid the COVID-19 pandemic, Saied suspended parliament for thirty days and relieved prime minister Hichem Mechichi of his duties. Saied's actions, which included assuming the executive authority, suspending the Parliament, waiving the immunity of the parliament members, ordering the military to close the parliament building, and closing the offices of some foreign news agencies, was classed by scholars as a self-coup, as he disregarded Article 80 of the Tunisian constitution, which states that before raising an emergency state, the president must consult his prime minister and the head of the parliament, and even then, the parliament cannot be suspended. However, there was no constitutional court in Tunisia to offer jurisdiction in his interpretation of the constitution. The president's decisions were also denounced by human rights organizations and considered by several foreign media outlets and Tunisian political entities as a self-coup. The self-coup came after a series of protests against the Ennahda-led government, economic difficulties, and the collapse of the Tunisian health system.

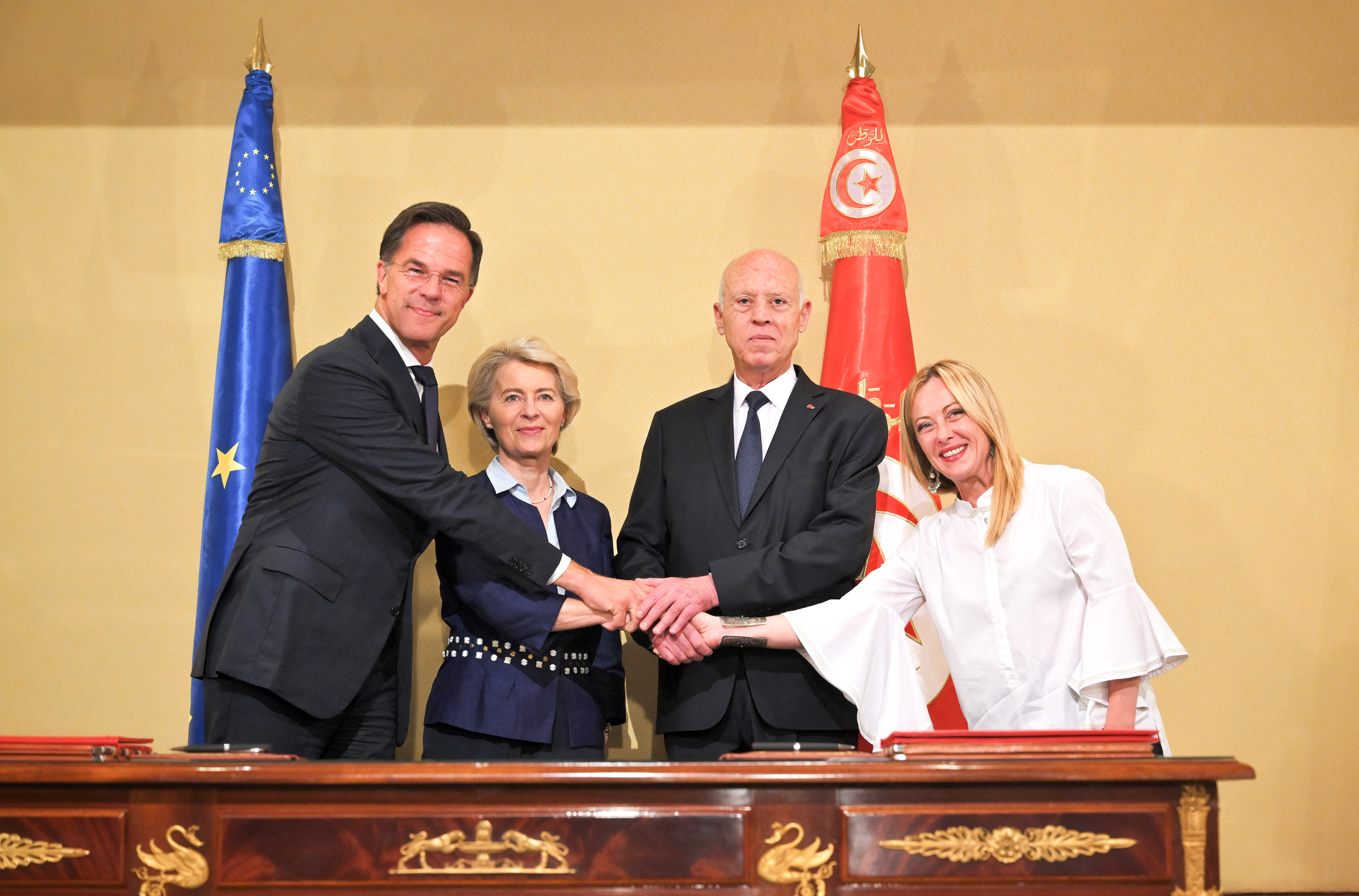
Saied with President of the European Commission Ursula von der Leyen, Italian Prime Minister Giorgia Meloni and Dutch Prime Minister Mark Rutte, 16 July 2023

On 24 August 2021, Saied extended the suspension of parliament, although the constitution stated the parliament can only be suspended for a month, raising concerns in some quarters about the future of democracy in the country. On 22 September, Saied announced that he will rule by decree and ignore parts of the constitution. Saied named Najla Bouden as Prime Minister on 29 September 2021, making her the first female prime minister both in Tunisia and the Arab world. Protests against consolidation of power continued in October 2021. On 13 December 2021, Saied extended the suspension of the parliament until a new election takes place, and announced a nationwide public consultation that would take place from 1 January until 20 March 2022 to gather suggestions for constitutional and other reforms after which Saied would appoint a committee of experts to draft a new constitution. The draft was released on 30 June ahead of the 2022 Tunisian constitutional referendum, with Saied announcing that new parliamentary elections would be held on 17 December 2022, after going through the referendum and preparing a new electoral system. The referendum was scheduled for 25 July 2022, with opposition, such as the National Salvation Front—a coalition made up of several political parties, including Ennahda, Al Amal, the Dignity Coalition, Heart of Tunisia, announcing that they would boycott the referendum. The new constitution was approved with 94.5% of the vote, despite a low turnout of 30.5%. Saied declared victory and promised that Tunisia will enter the new phase after he got increased power, some of which was unchecked. After the parliamentary election, the National Salvation Front called for Kais Saied to resign after less than 9% of eligible voters took part in the elections. Since the self-coup, several high-ranking politicians, such as former prime ministers Ali Larayedh and Hamadi Jebali, and former president Moncef Marzouki, have been arrested.

On 5 January 2022, the Tunisian judiciary referred 19 predominantly high-ranking politicians to court for "electoral violations" allegedly committed during the 2019 presidential elections. Among the 19 were four former prime ministers, Youssef Chahed, Elyes Fakhfakh, Mehdi Jomaa and Hamadi Jebali, as well as former president Moncef Marzouki, and the head of the Ennahda party movement, Rached Ghannouchi. In February 2022, Saied dissolved the Supreme Judicial Council, the body charged with judicial independence. According to the country's justice minister, the Saied has indicated that rather than eliminating the Supreme Judicial Council, he will restructure it. This comes days after the country's decision to disband the highest judicial body, which drew international condemnation. As a result of the president's decisions, more than two hundred judges and attorneys in black robes demonstrated outside the main court in Tunisia's capital in February 2022. On 13 February 2022, Saied issued a proclamation appointing a temporary Supreme Judiciary Council.

=== Immigration ===
In February 2023, Saied made comments about African immigration into Tunisia, saying that they were changing the demographic makeup of the country in order to make it a “purely African” nation. The comments were condemned as racist, including by Amnesty International and the African Union.

In July 2023, a deal with the European Union on immigration was finalised, following talks with European Commission president Ursula Von der Leyen, then Dutch prime minister Mark Rutte, and Italian prime minister Giorgia Meloni.

=== Relationship with Israel ===
Kais Saied is part of the Tunisian tradition of radical support for the Palestinian cause, considering any relationship with Israel to be high treason. In May 2023, after the attack on Djerba, he condemned the attack, rejected all accusations of state antisemitism, and refused to describe the attack as antisemitic. He received Muslim, Jewish, and Christian religious figures, rejected diplomatic recognition of Israel, and called for not conflating Judaism with Zionism. It was announced in September 2023 that the name of the Storm Daniel that destroyed Libya reflects the influence of the global Zionist movement. Shortly after the October 7 attacks, Saied expressed Tunisia's full and unconditional support for the Palestinian people, while avoiding mention of Hamas.

In November 2023, Saied objected to a law proposed by the Assembly of the Representatives of the People that would criminalise normalising relations with Israel, a crime that would carry a sentence of up to 12 years imprisonment, and life imprisonment if the offence was repeated. Saied stated that the law would undermine national security and that "it was counter-productive to criminalise relations with an entity that [Tunisia] does not recognize". Mohamed Ali, a member of the Assembly, claimed that the United States "had threatened 'economic and military sanctions' if the bill were passed".

=== Press freedom ===
In September 2022, the Tunisian president Kais Saied signed Decree Law 54, which purported to combat "false information and rumours" on the Internet. Article 24 of the decree gives up to five years imprisonment and a fine of up to 50,000 dinar for anyone found to be spreading such information. This is doubled if the offending statement is made about a state official.

In October 2025, a 56 year old man named Saber Chouchane was sentenced to death for posting on Facebook contents that criticized the president, a ruling which was called "shocking and unprecedented". This ruling was based on article 72 of the penal code i.e. "attack aimed at changing the form of government"; Tunisia has had a moratorium on death penalty since 1991. Saber Chouchane was imprisoned in January 2024 and, after a wave of criticism and protests, was finally released due to “a presidential pardon”.

=== 2026 health reports ===
In July 2026, Italian newspaper Il Foglio reported that Saied had allegedly been hospitalized, citing unnamed sources. The report was not confirmed by the Tunisian Presidency at the time, which had not released details regarding the president's health condition. The report prompted discussion about political continuity and constitutional procedures in Tunisia.

=== Environmental policy ===
In 2023, increased water scarcity due to climate change led the government to establish water rationing in some regions. Additionally, "In May 2023, the Tunisian government said that the wheat harvest was expected to reach only 250,000 tons of grain compared to an annual average of 1.5 million tons, causing the country to import 95% of its grain, "which has led to bread rationing and forced many bakeries to shut their doors". While the government of Kais Saied has tried taking some measures to address the problem, "Tunisians were, globally, the population most dissatisfied with efforts to preserve the environment (tied with Lebanon), according to a Gallup poll".

== Personal life ==
Kais Saied is married to Ichraf Chebil, a judge he met when she was a law student in Sousse. He has three children. Saied's interests include classical Arab music and Arabic calligraphy.

After assuming the presidency, Kais Saied garnered significant media attention for his handwritten official letters in fine Maghrebi script.

== Honours ==
=== National ===
- Grand Master and Grand Collar of the Order of Independence
- Grand Master and Grand Collar of the Order of the Republic
- Grand Master and Grand Collar of the National Order of Merit of Tunisia

=== Foreign ===
- Algeria:
  - Collar (Athir Class) of the National Order of Merit (2 February 2020)
- Palestine:
  - Grand Collar of the State of Palestine (8 December 2021)

=== Other Honors ===
- 2021 : Honorary degree from Sapienza University of Rome
- 2021 : Arab League' Honor Plaque
- 2022 : Honorary Gold Medal of the Council of Arab Interior Ministers
- 2023 : Medal of Arab tourism

== Publications ==
Saied is the author of a number of works on constitutional law, including:

- (in Arabic) Tunisian Political Texts and Documents (نصوص ووثائق سياسية تونسية) [with Abdelfattah Amor], published by the Center of Administrative, Political, and Social Studies and Research, Tunis, 1987
- (in French) General Provisions of the Constitution (Dispositions générales de la constitution) [direction], pub. Faculty of Juridical, Political, and Social Sciences of Tunis, Tunis, 2010

== See also ==
- List of current heads of state and government
- List of heads of the executive by approval rating

Political offices
Preceded by Mohamed Ennaceur; Acting	President of Tunisia; 2019–present	Incumbent
