= Abdelfattah Amor =

- Born: 4 March 1943; Ksar Hellal
- Died: 2 January 2012 (aged 68); Tunis
- Employer: United Nations
- Awards: Order of the Republic; Order of Civil Merit

Abdelfattah Amor (Arabic: عبد الفتاح عمر, born 4 March 1943 in Ksar Hellal, died January 2, 2012, in Tunis) was a Tunisian jurist, academic and specialist in public law.

== Career ==
Amor was professor and dean of the Faculty of Political Legal Sciences and social services of Tunis (University of Carthage) from 1987 to 1993. He was then honorary dean of that faculty from 1994. He served as chairman of the International Academy of Constitutional Law.

From 1993 to 2004 Amor served as the United Nations Special Rapporteur on Freedom of Religion or Belief. Later he was the chairman of the jury of UNESCO for the prize for human rights education from 2000 to 2008.

He was director of the study unit and research in law and political science at the Faculty of Law and Political Science and Economics of Tunis from 1978 to 1979. He served as president of the International Association of Constitutional Law from 1993 to 1995. He later joined and became a member of the United Nations Human Rights Committee where he later was appointed as its vice-president from 1999 to 2003 and then its president from 2003 to 2005.

Amor was a member of the Constitutional Council from 1987 until his resignation in 1992. He was a member of the Bureau of the International Conference of French Speaking Deans from 1987 to 1999 and an alternate member of the United Nations Sub-Commission on the Promotion and Protection of Human Rights from 1992 to 1995. He was a member of the Fundamental Rights Network Committee of the Agence universitaire de la Francophonie (Association of Partially or Fully French-Language Universities) from 1993 to 2003.

He served as president of the Tunisian Association of Constitutional Law from 1981 to 2005, founder and secretary general of the Tunisian Association of Political and Social Sciences from 1990 to 1995. He was a founding member of the Union of Arab Jurists in 1975, a member of the National Council of Civil Liberties in Tunisia in 1977, a member of the Algerian jury of aggregation in public law and political science in 1984 and president of the International Consultative Conference on Freedom of Religion or Belief tolerance and non-discrimination (Madrid in 2001. He served as an expert with the Arab League in charge of drafting a reform of the League Pact from 1979 to 1982.

After the Tunisian revolution of 2011, Amor was named as president of the National Commission of Investigation on the facts of corruption and embezzlement.

== Death ==
On 2 January 2012, Amor died of a heart attack while he was playing sports. He was buried in his home town on 4 January 2012. Several personalities attended his funeral including Yadh Ben Achour, Abdelkrim Zbidi, Rachid Ammar and Kamel Morjane.

== Awards ==
- Commander of Order of the Republic (Tunisia)
- Commander of the Order of Merit of Education (Tunisia)
- Officer of Order of Civil Merit (Spain)
- National Human Rights Prize (Tunisia)
- Academic awards from universities of Warsaw, Belgrade, Kyoto and Nuremberg.
