= COVID-19 pandemic in Tunisia =

Ongoing COVID-19 viral pandemic in Tunisia

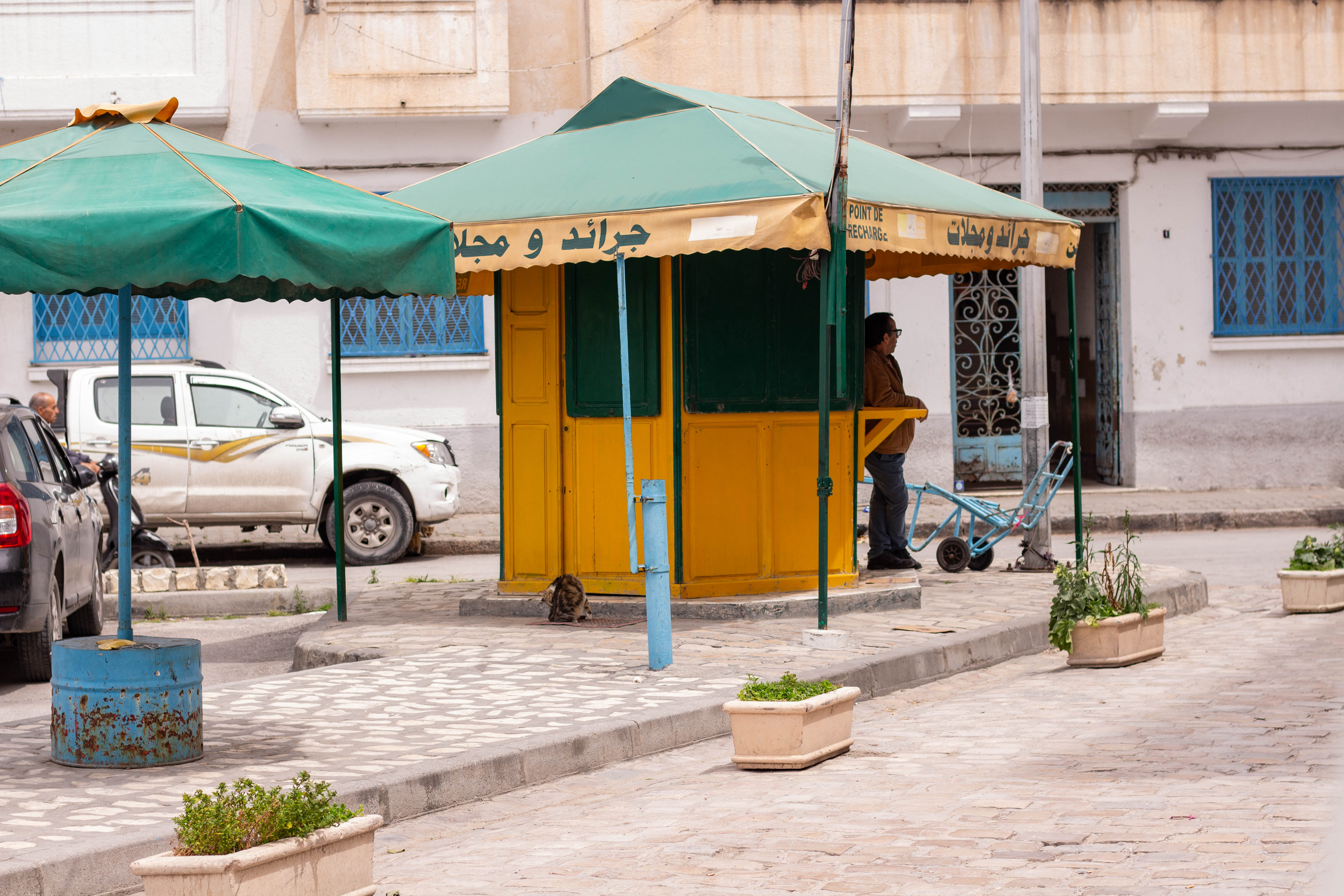
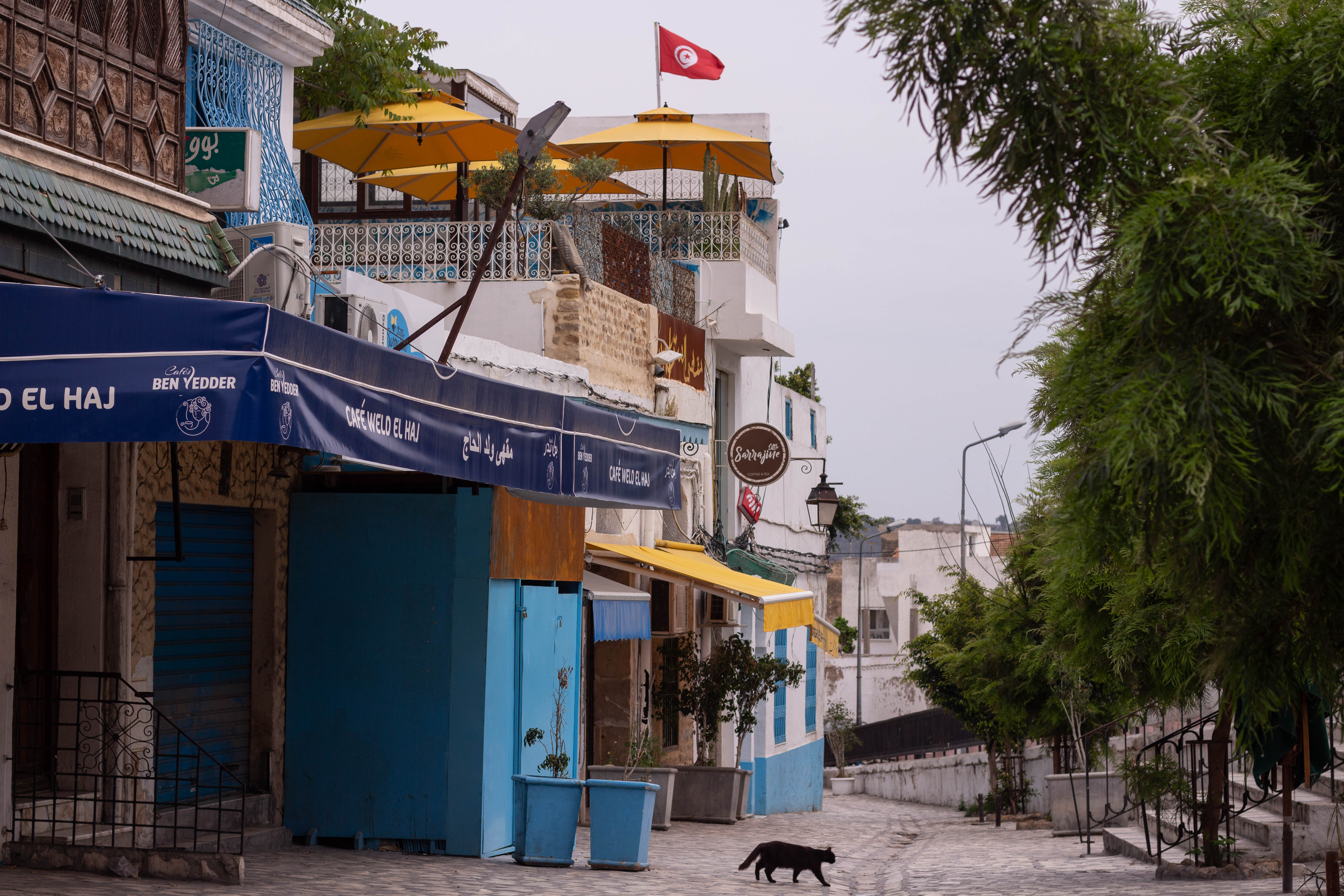
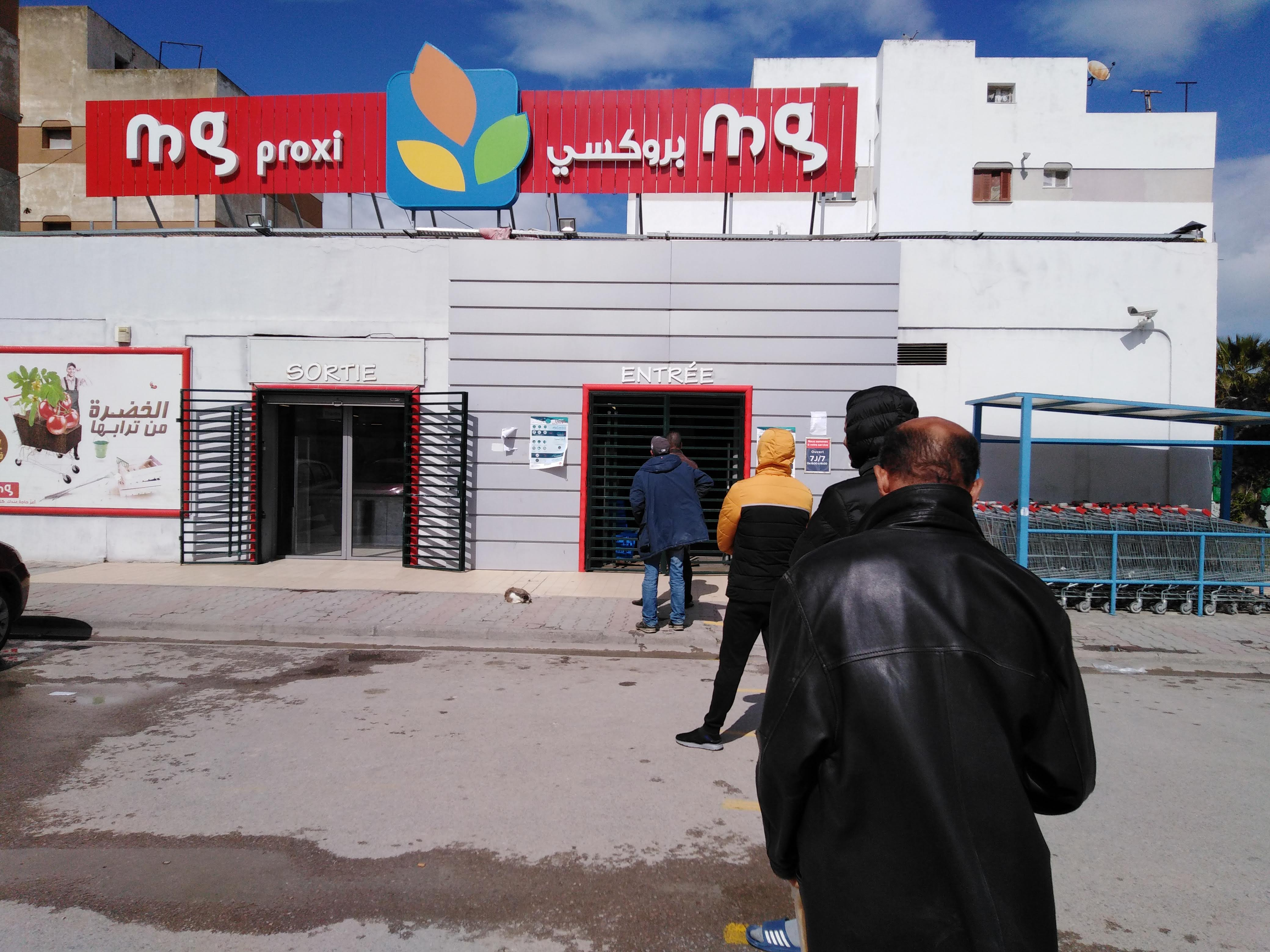
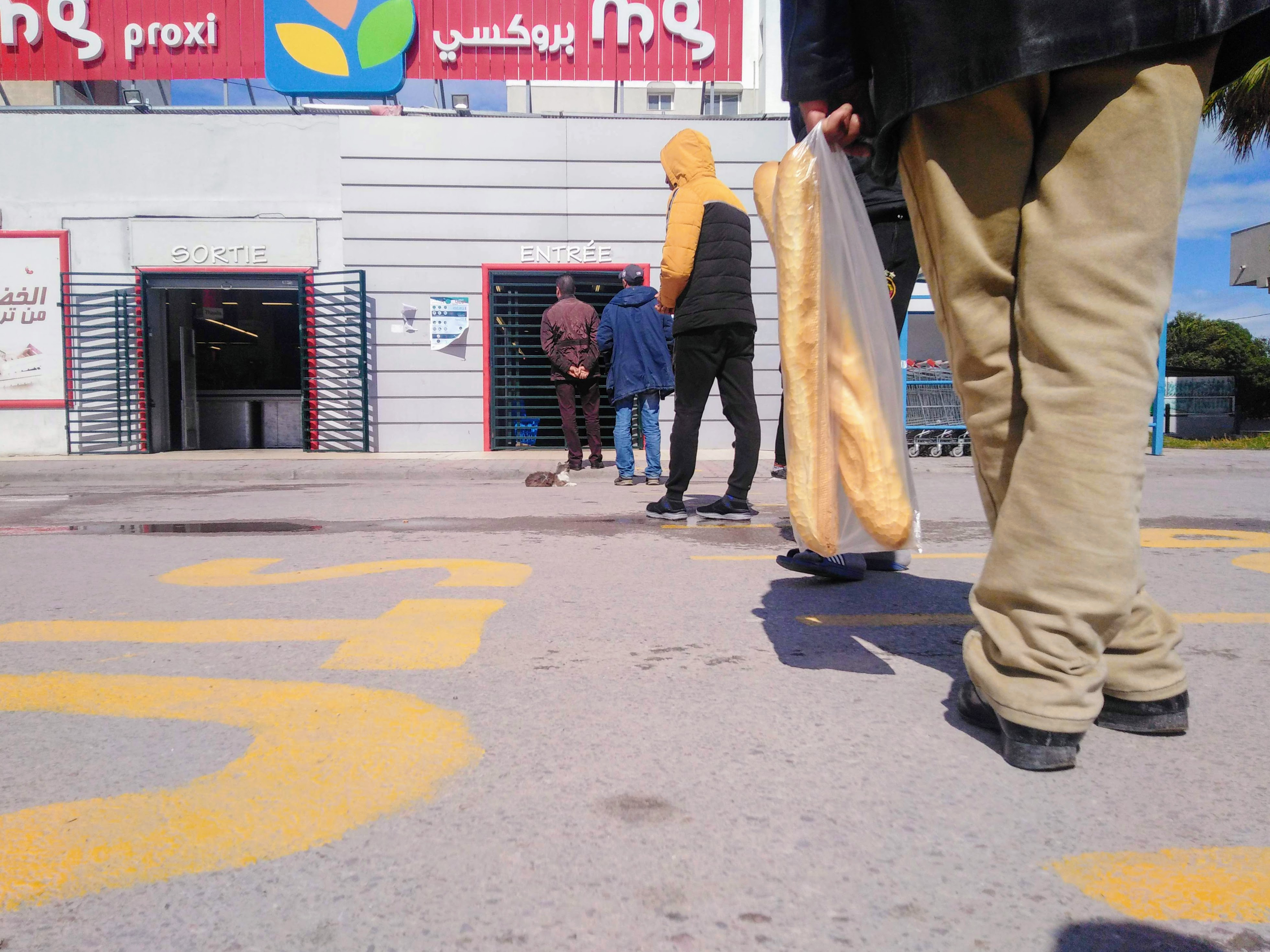
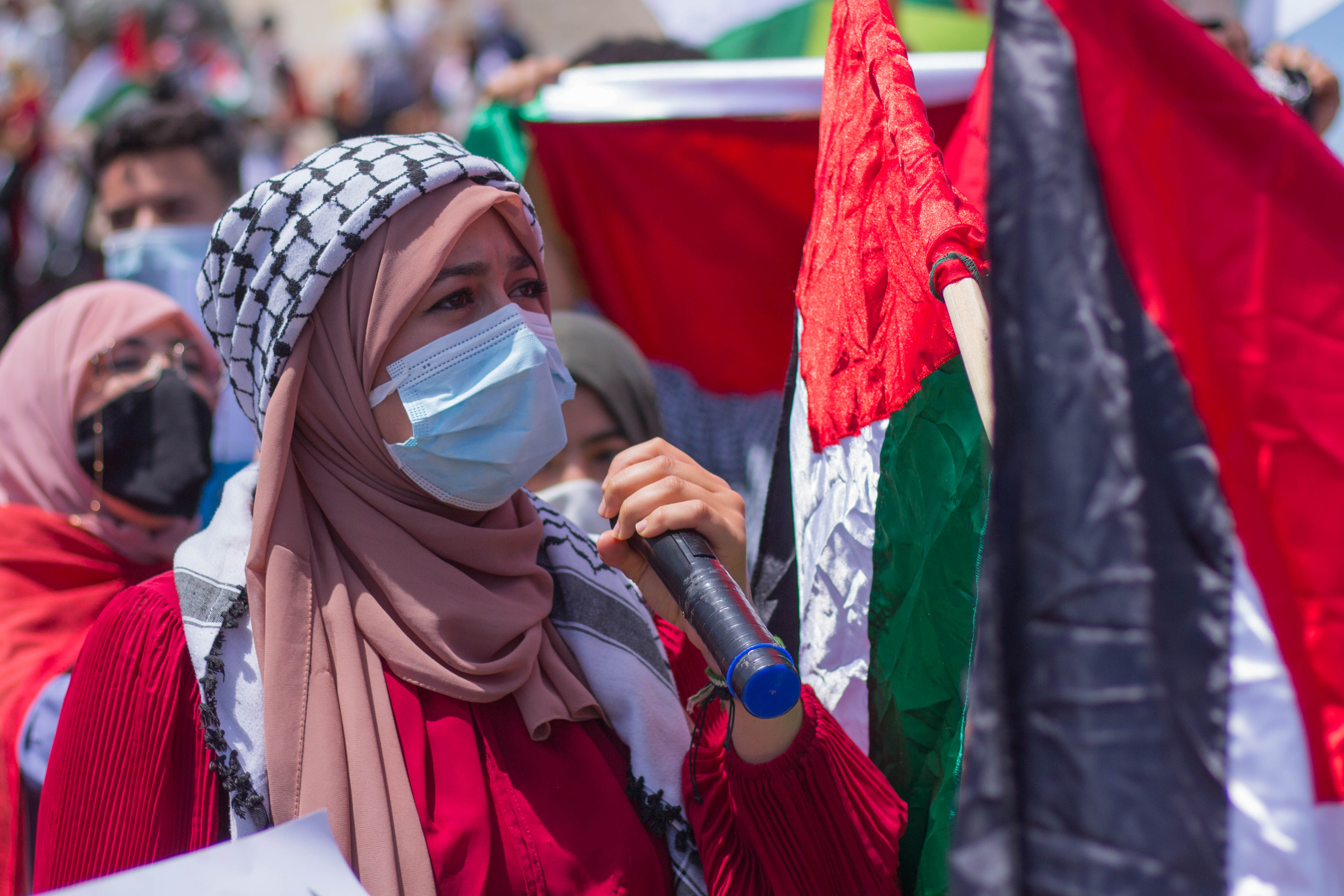
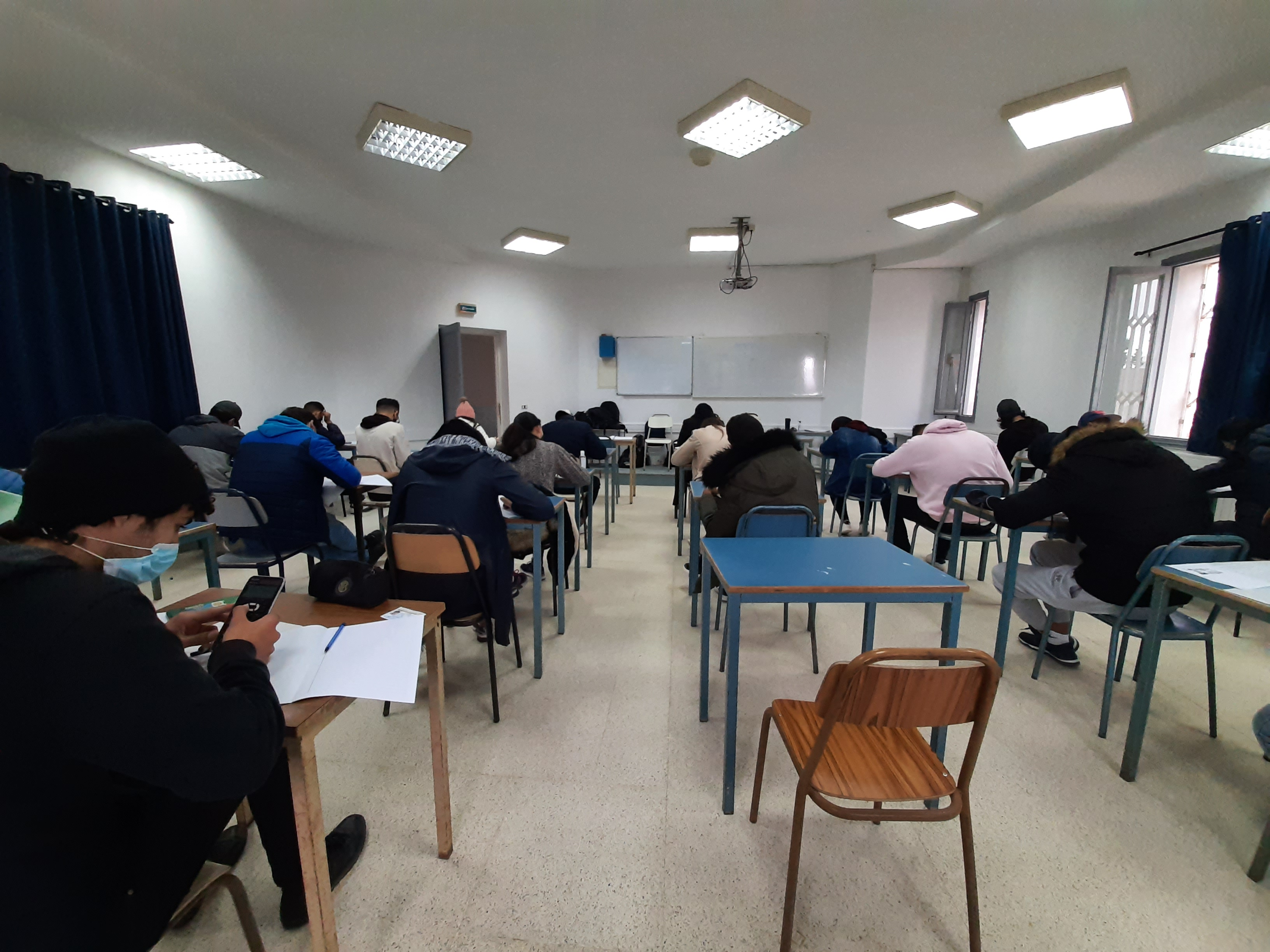
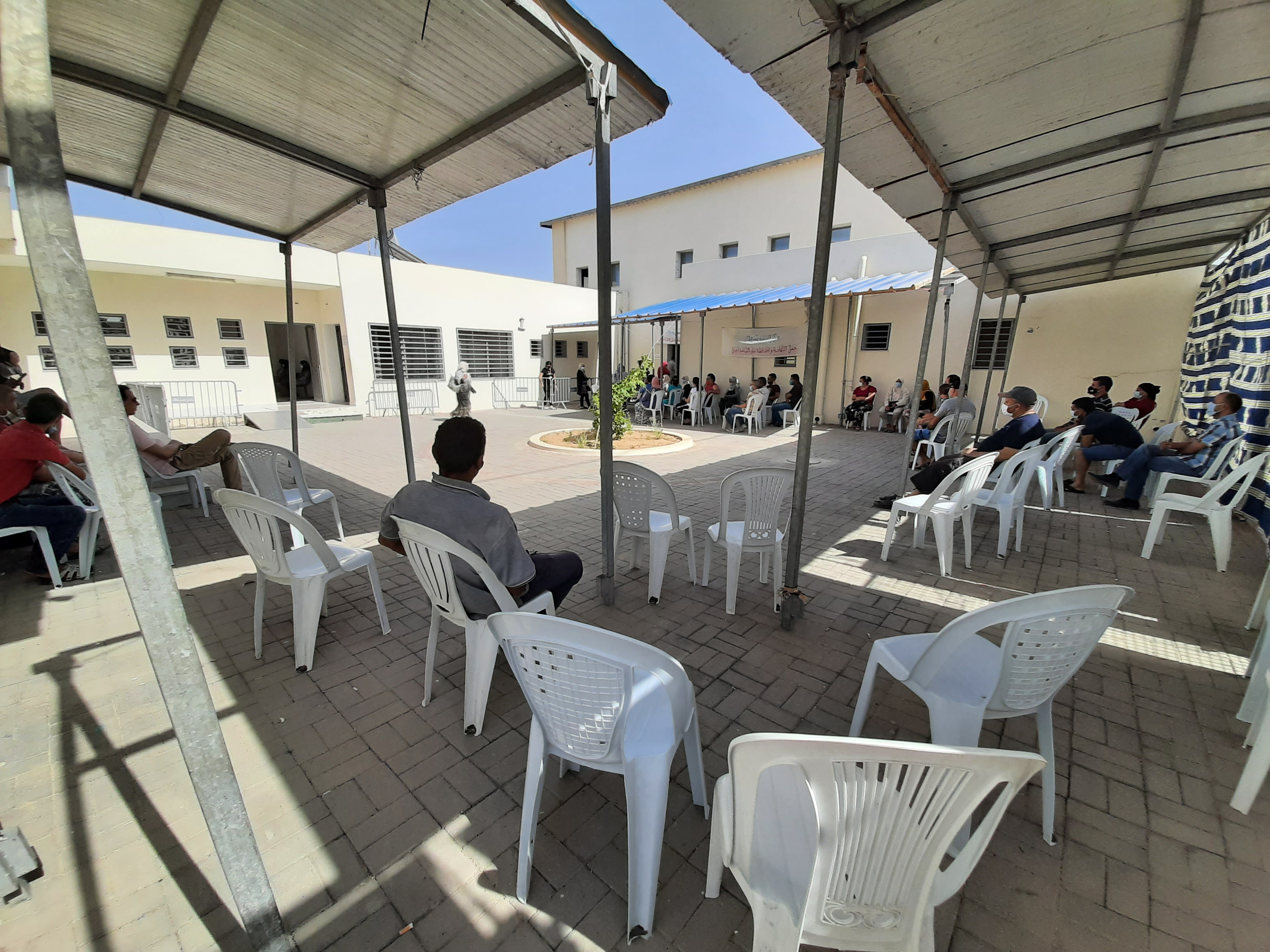
- From left to right: First row: Empty streets during quarantine, Second row: People maintaining social distancing, Third row: Pro-Palestinian demonstrations wearing masks, students wearing masks during an exam and fourth row: vaccination station.
- Disease: COVID-19
- Pathogen: SARS-CoV-2
- Location: Tunisia
- First outbreak: Wuhan, Hubei, China.
- Index case: Gafsa
- Arrival date: 2 March 2020 (6 years, 7 months, 3 weeks and 4 days)
- Confirmed cases: 1,153,361
- Recovered: 1,123,938 (updated 16 July 2023)
- Deaths: 29,423
- Fatality rate: 2.55%

Government website
- Ministère de la santé

The COVID-19 pandemic in Tunisia was a part of the ongoing pandemic of coronavirus disease 2019 (COVID-19) caused by severe acute respiratory syndrome coronavirus 2 (SARS-CoV-2). The disease was confirmed to have reached Tunisia on 2 March 2020.

== Background ==
On 12 January 2020, the World Health Organization (WHO) confirmed that a novel coronavirus was the cause of a respiratory illness in a cluster of people in Wuhan, Hubei, China, which was reported to the WHO on 31 December 2019.

The case fatality ratio for COVID-19 has been much lower than SARS of 2003, but the transmission has been significantly greater, with a significant total death toll. Model-based simulations for Tunisia indicate that the 95% confidence interval for the time-varying reproduction number R_{t} was higher than 1.0 from July to October 2020.

== Timeline ==
=== March 2020 ===
- Tunisia confirmed its first case on 2 March 2020, a 40-year-old Tunisian man from Gafsa returning from Italy.
- In addition, 74 suspected cases in Gafsa have been placed under home confinement. Two of the suspected cases violated the confinement measures, and the local health directorate decided to take legal action against them.
- In March there were 394 confirmed cases, 10 deaths and 3 recovered patients. The number of active cases at the end of the month was 381.

=== April to June 2020 ===
- There were 600 new cases in April, raising the total number of confirmed cases to 994. The death toll increased to 41. The number of recovered patients grew to 305. There were 648 active cases at the end of the month.
- On 10 May 2020, Tunisia recorded zero new coronavirus cases for the first time since early March.
- During May the number of confirmed cases grew by 83 to 1077. There were seven more fatalities, bringing the death toll to 48. The number of recovered patients rose to 960, leaving 69 active cases at the end of the month.
- In June there were 97 new cases, bringing the total number of confirmed cases to 1174. Two more patients died, raising the death toll to 50. The number of recovered patients grew to 1031, leaving 93 active cases at the end of the month.

=== July to September 2020 ===
- On 17 July, the Ministry of Public Health announced that 9 new cases tested positive as of 16 July, including 4 cases of local contamination, raising the total to 1336 confirmed cases.
- By the end of the month, the number of confirmed cases had risen to 1535, an increase by 361 in July. The death toll remained unchanged. The number of recovered patients grew to 1195, leaving 290 active cases by the end of the month.
- There were 2,268 new cases in August, raising the total number of confirmed cases to 3,803. The death toll rose to 77. There were 2,153 active cases at the end of the month.
- There were 13,602 new cases in September, raising the total number of confirmed cases to 17,405. The death toll more than tripled to 246.

=== October to December 2020 ===
- There were 42,408 new cases in October, raising the total number of confirmed cases to 59,813. The death toll more than quadrupled to 1,317. There were 53,464 active cases at the end of the month.
- There were 36,956 new cases in November, bringing the total number of confirmed cases to 96,769. The death toll more than doubled to 3,260. The number of recovered patients increased to 70,851, leaving 22,658 active cases at the end of the month.
- Health Minister Faouzi Mehdi extended the curfew until January 15 to cover the New Year's holiday and urging people not to hold end-of-year festivities or travel around the country. The country has seen about 50 COVID deaths per day over the last few months. Although Tunisia has not registered any cases of the new virus variant identified in the U.K., the country has suspended all flights with Britain, South Africa, and Australia.
- There were 42,371 new cases in December, raising the total number of confirmed cases to 139,140. The death toll rose to 4,676. The number of recovered patients increased to 105,364, leaving 29,100 active cases at the end of the month.

=== Subsequent cases ===
- 2021 cases

On 2 March, the first cases of lineage B.1.1.7 (the 'UK variant') were reported in Tunisia. Tunisia's first case of the Omicron variant was reported on 3 December.

On 21 July, Prime Minister Hichem Mechichi fired Faouzi Mehdi as its health minister and appointed Mohamed Trabelsi as caretaker health minister amid a collapse of the healthcare system due to the increase of COVID-19 cases.

There were 588,703 new cases in 2021, bringing the total number of confirmed cases to 727,843. 591,122 patients recovered in 2021 while 20,900 died, raising the death toll to 25,576. There were 5,781 active cases at the end of 2021.

- 2022 cases

On 2 January 2022, one death and five hundred and forty two new cases were reported. There were 179,396 new cases in January, raising the total number of confirmed cases to 907,239. The death toll rose to 26,271. The number of recovered patients increased to 766,677, leaving 114,291 active cases at the end of the month.

There were 90,991 new cases in February, raising the total number of confirmed cases to 998,230. The death toll rose to 27,784. The number of recovered patients increased to 950,873, leaving 19,573 active cases at the end of the month.

There were 39,128 new cases in March, raising the total number of confirmed cases to 1,037,358. The death toll rose to 28,425. The number of recovered patients increased to 1,022,000, leaving no active cases at the end of the month.

There were 3,354 new cases in April, bringing the total number of confirmed cases to 1,040,712. The death toll rose to 28,566. The number of recovered patients increased to 1,026,756.

There were 2,160 new cases in May, bringing the total number of confirmed cases to 1,042,872. The death toll rose to 28,641. The number of recovered patients increased to 1,028,885.

There were 23,255 new cases in June, bringing the total number of confirmed cases to 1,066,127. The death toll rose to 28,748. The number of recovered patients increased to 1,037,537.

There were 68,533 new cases in July, bringing the total number of confirmed cases to 1,134,660. The death toll rose to 29,105. The number of recovered patients increased to 1,114,359.

There were 9,802 new cases in August, bringing the total number of confirmed cases to 1,143,862. The death toll rose to 29,234.

There were 1,824 new cases in September, bringing the total number of confirmed cases to 1,145,686. The death toll rose to 29,246. The number of recovered patients increased to 1,132,266.

There were 907 new cases in October, bringing the total number of confirmed cases to 1,146,593. The death toll rose to 29,259. The number of recovered patients increased to 1,133,072.

There were 479 new cases in November, bringing the total number of confirmed cases to 1,147,072. The death toll rose to 29,268.

There were 573 new cases in December, bringing the total number of confirmed cases to 1,147,645. The death toll rose to 29,285. The number of recovered patients increased to 1,134,465.

- 2023 cases

There were 2,711 new cases in January, 606 in February, 1,071 in March and 844 in April, bringing the total number of confirmed cases to 1,150,356 in January, 1,150,962 in February, 1,152,033 in March and 1,152,877 in April. The death toll rose to 29,308 in January, 29,331 in February, 29,363 in March and 29,398. The number of recovered patients increased to 1,134,769 in January, 1,135,170 in February, 1,136,175 in March and 1,136,957 in April.

== Economic consequences ==
On 18 March 2020, the President of the Tunis Stock Exchange (BVMT) noted a 14.2% drop in the stock market index in Tunisia. On 21 March 2020, the flagship index of the Tunis Stock Exchange finished falling by 7.3% to 6,138.82 points.

== Statistics ==
=== Charts ===
==== Total no. of cases (cumulative) ====
View source data.
Source: covid-19.tn

==== Confirmed new cases per day ====
View source data.

==== Confirmed deaths per day ====
View source data.

=== Cases identified by Governorates of Tunisia ===
Cases identified by Governorate
Governorate	Cases	Deaths	Recoveries
Tunis	883	14	267
Ben Arous	864	7	133
Kébili	190	2	121
Sousse	601	15	136
Ariana	395	9	139
Médenine	270	7	160
Gafsa	83	1	66
Monastir	442	3	71
Sfax	284	7	87
Manouba	116	6	52
Kasserine	73	0	49
Tataouine	130	4	79
Bizerte	118	2	40
Gabès	1044	16	196
Mahdia	90	2	52
Nabeul	213	1	48
Kairouan	190	4	76
Sidi Bouzid	82	3	22
Le Kef	340	2	129
Béja	28	0	17
Tozeur	14	0	13
Siliana	59	0	11
Jendouba	110	2	19
Zaghouan	16	0	8
Total	6635	107	1991
Source: Ministry of Public Health As of 15 January 2021

== See also ==
- COVID-19 pandemic in Africa
- COVID-19 pandemic by country and territory
