= List of political parties in Tunisia =

This article lists political parties in Tunisia. Tunisia was a dominant-party state of the Constitutional Democratic Rally ("RCD" from its French language initials) before the Tunisian revolution. In the aftermath of the revolution the RCD was dissolved by the new state authorities and over 70 new political parties formed. The country is now a multiparty state. Although there are two numerically major parties, no single party has a realistic chance of governing alone.

== Parties represented in the Assembly of the Representatives of the People ==
Party	Leader	Political position	Ideology	ARP seats	Stance towards 2021 Tunisian self-coup
Ennahda Movement; Arabic: حركة النهضة; Ḥarakat an-Nahḍa, lit. 'Renaissance Movement'; French: Mouvement Ennahda	Rached Ghannouchi	Right-wing	Social conservatism Economic liberalism Islamic democracy	0 / 217	Opposed
Heart of Tunisia; Arabic: قلب تونس, romanized: Qalb Tūnis; French: Au cœur de la Tunisie; Berber languages: Ul en Tunest	Nabil Karoui	Centre	Bourguibism; Populism; Secularism	0 / 217	Opposed
Democratic Current; Arabic: التيّار الديمُقراطي at-Tayyār ad-Dīmuqrāṭī; French: Courant démocrate	Ghazi Chaouachi	Centre-left	Social democracy Progressivism; Nationalism; Pan-Arabism	0 / 217	Opposed
Dignity Coalition; Arabic: ائتلاف الكرامة; Iʾtilāf al-Karāma; French: Coalition de la dignité	Seifeddine Makhlouf	Far-right	Islamism; Francophobia; Social conservatism	0 / 217	Opposed
Free Destourian Party (PDL); Arabic: الحزب الدستوري الحر al-Ḥizb ad-Dustūrī al-Ḥurr, lit. 'Free Constitutional Party'; French: Partie destourien libre	Abir Moussi	Big tent	Tunisian nationalism Bourguibism; Secularism	0 / 217	Opposed
People's Movement; Arabic: حركة الشعب; Ḥarakat aš-Šaʿb; French: Mouvement du peuple	Zouhair Maghzaoui	Left-wing	Secularism; Democratic socialism Nasserism; Arab nationalism	11 / 217	Supportive
Tahya Tounes; Arabic: تحيا تونس; Taḥyā Tūnis, lit. 'Long Live Tunisia'; French: Vive la Tunisie	Youssef Chahed	Centre	Bourguibism; Secularism; Liberalism	0 / 217	
Machrouu Tounes (MPT); Arabic: مشروع تونس; Mašrūʿ Tūnis, lit. 'Project Tunisia'; French: Mouvement du projet de la Tunisie	Mohsen Marzouk	Centre-left to centre-right	Secularism; Bourguibism	0 / 217	Opposed
Errahma; Arabic: حزب الرحمة; Ḥizb ar-Raḥma, lit. 'Party of Divine Mercy'; French: Parti de la miséricorde	Saïd Jaziri		Islamism; Islamic democracy Religious conservatism	0 / 217	
Republican People's Union; Arabic: الاتحاد الشعبي الجمهوري al-Aitihad al-Shaebiu al-Jumhuriu; French: Union populaire républicaine	Lotfi Mraïhi		Neo-Bourguibism	0 / 217	
Tunisian Alternative; Arabic: البديل التونسي, romanized: al-Badil Ettounsi	Mehdi Jomaa	Centre	Liberalism	0 / 217	
Nidaa Tounes; Arabic: حركة نداء تونس; Ḥarakat Nidā’ Tūnis, lit. 'Call of Tunisia'; French: Appel de la Tunisie	Khemaies Jhinaoui	Centre to centre-left	Bourguibism; Social democracy Third Way; Secularism	0 / 217	
Afek Tounes; Arabic: آفاق تونس; Āfāq Tūnis, lit. 'Tunisian Horizons'	Yassine Brahim	Centre-right	Liberalism; Secularism	0 / 217	Opposed
Popular Front; Arabic: الجبهة الشعبية, romanized: al-Ğabha aš-Šaʿbiyya; French: Front populaire		Left-wing to far-left	Socialism; Secularism; Arab nationalism Pan-Arabism	0 / 217	Opposed
Aïch Tounsi; Arabic: عيش تونسي, romanized: Eish Tunusiun	Olfa Terras		Populism	0 / 217	
Farmers' Voice Party; Arabic: حزب صوت الفلاحين, romanized: Ḥizb Ṣawt al-Fallāḥīn; French: Parti de la voix des agriculteurs	Fayçal Tebbini		Agrarianism	0 / 217	
Green League; Arabic: الرابطة الخضراء, romanized: al-Raabitat al-Khadra'; French: Ligue verte				0 / 217	
Current of Love; Arabic: تيار المحبة, romanized: Tayyār al-Maḥabba; French: Courant de l'amour	Mohamed Hechmi Hamdi		Populism; Islamic democracy Social conservatism Regionalism	0 / 217	
Democratic and Social Union (VDS-PR-MDS); Arabic: الاتحاد الديمقراطي الاجتماعي al-Aitihad ad-Diymuqratiu al-Aijtimaeiu; French: Union démocratique et sociale			Democratic socialism Progressivism	0 / 217	Opposed
Socialist Destourian Party; Arabic: الحزب الاشتراكي الدستوري al-Hizb al-Aishtirakiu ad-Dusturiu; French: Parti socialiste destourien	Chokri Balti			0 / 217	

== Other parties ==
The following opposition parties exist de jure and/or de facto. On January 20, 2011 the cabinet of the interim government recognized all previously banned parties, with the exception of Hizb ut-Tahrir and a few other parties.

=== Legalized before the Tunisian revolution ===
- Democratic Forum for Labour and Liberties (FDTL, or Ettakatol)
- Ettajdid Movement, or Renewal Movement
- Green Party for Progress (PVP, Arabic: حزب الخضر للتقدم, French: Parti des verts pour le progrès)
- Movement of Socialist Democrats (MDS)
- Popular Unity Party (PUP)
- Progressive Democratic Party (PDP), now merged into the Republican Party.
- Social Liberal Party (PSL)
- Unionist Democratic Union (UDU)
- Liberal Democratic Social Party (Parti social démocratique liberal)

=== Legalized after the Tunisian revolution ===
- El Amen Party
- Congress for the Republic (CPR)
- Cultural Unionist Nation Party
- Democratic Alliance Party
- Democratic Patriots' Unified Party, formerly the Democratic Patriots' Movement
- Democratic Social Nation Party
- Equity and Equality Party
- Free Patriotic Union
- Future Tunisia Party (حركة تونس المستقبل, Mouvement Tunisie de l'Avenir)
- Green Tunisia Party
- Hizb ut-Tahrir or the Liberation Party
- Homeland Party or Al Watan
- Al Iklaa Party
- Initiative
- Justice and Development Party
- Maghrebi Republican Party (PRM)
- Movement of the Republic
- New Destour Party
- Patriotic and Democratic Labour Party (حزب العمل الوطني الديمقراطي, Parti du travail patriotique et démocratique)
- Parti Democrate Liberal
- Patriotic Construction Party
- Pirate Party
- Popular Unity Movement
- Popular Unity Party
- Progressive People's Party
- Reform and Development Party
- Reform Front Party
- Republican Party
- Social Democratic Path
- Socialist Party, formerly the Left Socialist Party
- Third Alternative
- Third Republic الجمهورية الثالثة
- Tunisia Forward
- Tunisian Ba'ath Movement (حركة البعث تونس, Mouvement Baath de Tunisie)
- Tunisian Movement for Freedom and Dignity
- Tunisian National Front
- Tunisian Nationalist Party
- Tunisian Pirate Party
- Voice of the People of Tunisia
- Wafa Movement
- Al-Watan Party
- Workers' Party (PT), formerly the Tunisian Workers' Communist Party (PCOT)

=== Defunct parties ===
- Destour, founded 1920; split in 1934 resulted in the Neo Destour.
- Neo Destour, which became the PSD in 1964.
- Socialist Destourian Party (PSD), which became the RCD in 1988.
- Constitutional Democratic Rally (RCD). Dissolved in 2011.
- Tunisian Communist Party. Became the Ettajdid Movement.
- Progressive Democratic Party (PDP), merged into the Republican Party.
- Ettajdid Movement. Merged into the Social Democratic Path.
- Free Patriotic Union. Merged into Nidaa Tounes.
- National Destourian Initiative. Merged into Long Live Tunisia.

== See also ==
- Politics of Tunisia
- List of ruling political parties by country
