= Socialism in Tunisia =

Socialism in Tunisia or Tunisian socialism is a political philosophy shared by various political parties in the country. It has played a role in the country's history from the time of the Tunisian independence movement against France up through the Tunisian Revolution to the present day.

== Movement of Socialist Democrats ==
In 1978, the Movement of Socialist Democrats (MDS) was founded by defectors from the then-ruling Socialist Destourian Party (PSD) and liberal-minded expatriates. The founders of the MDS had already been involved in the establishment of the Tunisian Human Rights League (LTDH) in 1976/77. Its first secretary general was Ahmed Mestiri, who had been a member of the PSD and interior minister in the government of Habib Bourguiba, but was dropped from the government in 1971 and expelled from the party after he had called for democratic reforms and pluralism. The MDS was to officially register in 1983. It was one of three legal opposition parties during the 1980s. The MDS welcomed Zine El Abidine Ben Ali taking over the presidency from the long-term head of state Bourguiba in 1987. Many MDS members believed that Ben Ali really pursued reforms and liberalisation and defected to his Constitutional Democratic Rally (RCD), weakening the MDS. Ahmed Mestiri led the party until 1990. In the early 1990s, the party was torn between cooperation with the government and opposition. Those who strove for a strictly oppositional course left the party or were edged out. In 1994, a group of MDS dissidents around Mustapha Ben Jaafar founded the Democratic Forum for Labour and Liberties (FDTL), which was only legalised in 2002.

== Democratic Forum for Labour and Liberties ==
On 9 April 1994, the Democratic Forum for Labour and Liberties (Ettakatol or FDTL) was founded and officially recognized on 25 October 2002. Is a social democratic and secularist political party in Tunisia. Its founder and Secretary-General is the radiologist Mustapha Ben Jafar.

== Ettajdid Movement ==
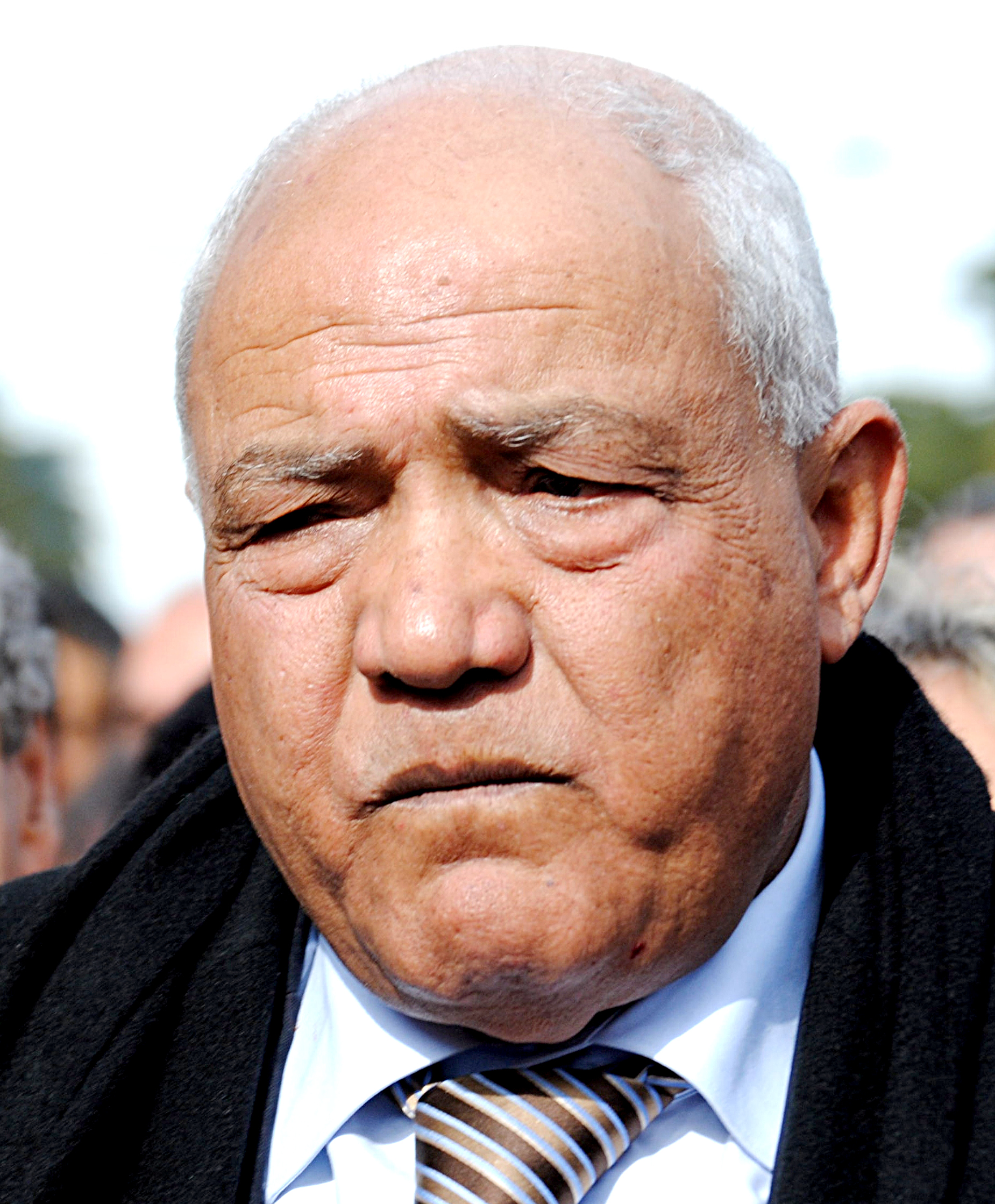
Ahmed Brahim

Active from 1993 to 2012, the Ettajdid Movement (Movement for Renewal) was a centre-left secularist, democratic socialist and social liberal political party in Tunisia. It was led by Ahmed Ibrahim. For the Constituent Assembly election, Ettajdid formed a strongly secularist alliance called the Democratic Modernist Pole (PDM), of which it was the mainstay.

Ahmed Brahim was the First Secretary of the movement and also the leader of the Democratic Modernist Pole until April 2012, when his party merged into the Social Democratic Path, of which he became the president. He was the Ettajdid Movement's candidate for President of Tunisia in the 2009 presidential election. Brahim was in favor of the emergence of a "democratic modern and secular [laicist] state" not connected with Islamists. According to Brahim, this would require "radical" reform of the electoral system, which would improve the political climate by guaranteeing freedom of assembly and a large-scale independent press, as well as repealing a law that regulated public discourse of electoral candidates.

== Tunisian Revolution ==
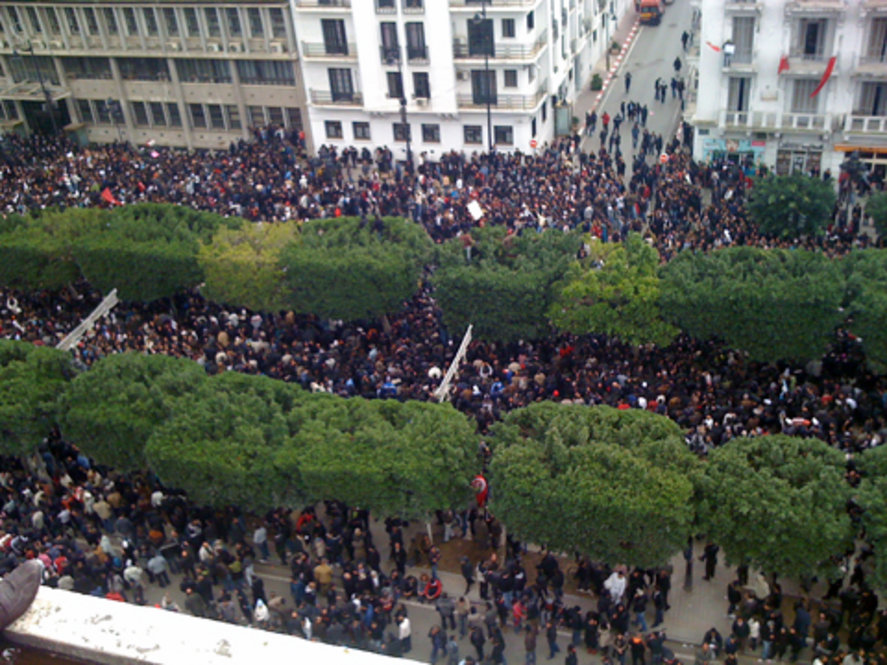
Protesters on Avenue Habib Bourguiba, downtown Tunis on 14 January 2011, a few hours before president Zine El Abidine Ben Ali fled the country.

The Tunisian Revolution was an intensive campaign of civil resistance, including a series of street demonstrations taking place in Tunisia, and led to the ousting of longtime president Zine El Abidine Ben Ali in January 2011. It eventually led to a thorough democratization of the country and to free and democratic elections with the Tunisian Constitution of 2014, which is seen as progressive, increases human rights, gender equality, government duties toward people, lays the ground for a new parliamentary system and makes Tunisia a decentralized and open government. And with the holding of the country's first parliamentary elections since the 2011 Arab Spring and its presidential election on 23 November 2014, which finished its transition to a democratic state. These elections were characterized by the fall in popularity of Ennahdha and the rise of the secular Nidaa Tounes party, which became the first party of the country.

The demonstrations were caused by high unemployment, food inflation, corruption, a lack of political freedoms like freedom of speech, and poor living conditions. The protests constituted the most dramatic wave of social and political unrest in Tunisia in three decades and resulted in scores of deaths and injuries, most of which were the result of actions by police and security forces against demonstrators. The protests were sparked by the self-immolation of Mohamed Bouazizi on 17 December 2010 and led to the ousting of President Zine El Abidine Ben Ali 28 days later on 14 January 2011, when he officially resigned after fleeing to Saudi Arabia, ending 23 years in power. Labour unions were said to be an integral part of the protests. The Tunisian National Dialogue Quartet was awarded the 2015 Nobel Peace Prize for "its decisive contribution to the building of a pluralistic democracy in Tunisia in the wake of the Tunisian Revolution of 2011". The protests inspired similar actions throughout the Arab world.

== People's Movement ==
Founded in 2011, the People's Movement is a secularist and Arab nationalist political party in Tunisia. It has a social democratic platform and is aligned with workers groups. The party belongs to the Popular Front coalition of left-leaning parties led by Hamma Hammami, leader of the Tunisian Workers Party. The coalition includes ten nationalist left-wing groups, including the People's Movement.

== Popular Front ==
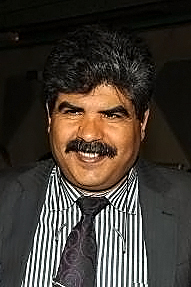
Mohamed Brahmi, founder a former leader of the Popular Front, assassinated on 25 July 2013.

The Popular Front for the Realization of the Objectives of the Revolution, commonly known as Popular Front (ej-Jabha), is a leftist political and electoral alliance in Tunisia, made up of nine political parties and numerous independents. The coalition was formed in October 2012, bringing together 12 mainly left-wing Tunisian parties, including the Democratic Patriots' Unified Party, the Workers' Party, Green Tunisia, the Movement of Socialist Democrats (which has left), the Tunisian Ba'ath Movement and Arab Democratic Vanguard Party, two different parties of the Iraqi branch of Ba'ath Party, and other progressive parties. The number of parties involved in the coalition has since decreased to nine. Approximately 15,000 people attended the coalition's first meeting in Tunis.

The coordinator of the Popular Front coalition, Chokri Belaid, was killed by an unknown gunman on 6 February 2013. An estimated 1,400,000 people took part in his funeral, while protesters clashed with police and Ennahda supporters,

On 25 July 2013, Mohamed Brahmi, founder a former leader of the Popular Front, assassinated on was assassinated. Numerous protests erupted in the streets following his assassination. Following his death, hundreds of his supporters, including relatives and party members of the People's Movement, demonstrated in front of the Interior Ministry's building on Avenue Habib Bourguiba and blamed the incumbent Ennahda Party and their followers for the assassination. Hundreds of supporters also protested in Brahmi's hometown of Sidi Bouzid.

== See also ==
- Anarchism in Tunisia
