= Abderrahmane Tlili =

Tunisian businessman and politician (1943–2026)

- عبد الرحمن التليلي
- Born: 30 March 1943; Gafsa, French protectorate of Tunisia
- Died: 23 August 2026 (aged 83)
- Education: French Press Institute
- Occupations: Businessman; Politician

Abderrahmane Tlili (Arabic: عبد الرحمن التليلي; 30 March 1943 – 23 August 2026) was a Tunisian businessman and politician.

== Biography ==
Born in Gafsa on 30 March 1943, Tlili was the son of trade unionist Ahmed Tlili and his wife, Fatma. He graduated from the French Press Institute and worked for the Office national de l'huile and later served as president of the Compagnie franco-tunisienne de pétrole from 1995 to 1996. He had also entered politics in 1980, serving on the central committee of the Socialist Destourian Party from 1981 to 1988. In November 1988, he founded the Unionist Democratic Union (UDU). In 1996, he was named a Grand Officer of the Order of the Republic. He ran in the 1999 presidential election for the UDU, securing only 0.23% against the incumbent President Zine El Abidine Ben Ali's 99.45%.[Geisser] He announced his support for Ben Ali in 2004. He later published a book titled La Tunisie au cœur : les réflexions d'un candidat à la présidentielle de 1999, which detailed his 1999 presidential run.

In 2000, Tlili was named president of the Tunisian Civil Aviation and Airports Authority (OACA). However, he was forced into retirement on 23 August 2003, and was assaulted outside his mother's home in El Menzah six days later. Meanwhile, his successor at the OACA conducted an internal audit, which uncovered alleged illegal contracts for construction work at three Tunisian airports designed to be detrimental to French company Sodica. on 3 October 2003, the Feuille d'avis officielle de la République et canton de Genève substantiated reports that he had amassed a large fortune deposited into banks in Italy and Switzerland. He appeared in front of the Court of Appeal of Tunis on 9 July 2004, where he was sentenced to nine years in prison and a fine of 42.7 million dinars. He was also ordered to pay an additional 6.7 million dinars for material damages and 100,000 dinars in non-pecuniary damages. In 2006, he went on hunger strike due to lack of medical care suited for his age and his diabetes. On 15 January 2008, he began another hunger strike that lasted for 37 days. However, the strike's existence was denied by Tunisian authorities, dismissing it as a ploy to distract from the crimes he committed. However, his testimony appeared in major French newspapers such as Le Figaro and Libération. His mother also began a hunger strike around the same time, though two days into the strike, she was harassed by plainclothes police officers. After President Ben Ali was overthrown in the Tunisian revolution, he was freed on 17 January 2011.

Tlili died on 23 August 2026, at the age of 83.
