= 1981 Tunisian parliamentary election =

Early parliamentary elections were held in Tunisia on 1 November 1981, following changes to the constitution to allow for multi-party politics after 18 years of one-party rule by the Socialist Destourian Party (PSD). The PSD contested the elections as the lead party of the National Front, an alliance with the Tunisian General Labour Union. Three other parties also nominated candidates; the Movement of Socialist Democrats, the Popular Unity Movement and the Tunisian Communist Party. In total 366 candidates (including 18 independents) contested the 136 seats.

According to official results, the National Front won all 136 seats in the Chamber of Deputies. Voter turnout was 85%. Opposition parties would not manage to enter the Chamber until 1994.

== Results ==
Party	Votes	%	Seats	+/–
National Front (PSD–UGTT)		94.60	136	+15
Movement of Socialist Democrats		3.28	0	New
Popular Unity Movement		0.81	0	New
Tunisian Communist Party		0.78	0	New
Independents		0.35	0	New
Total			136	+15
Valid votes	1,941,858	98.97		
Invalid/blank votes	20,269	1.03		
Total votes	1,962,127	100.00		
Registered voters/turnout	2,311,031	84.90		
Source: Le Monde
