= 1994 Tunisian general election =

- 20 March 1994
- Presidential election
Nominee	Zine El Abidine Ben Ali
Party	PSD
Popular vote	2,987,375
Percentage	100%
President before election
Zine El Abidine Ben Ali
PSD
Elected President
Zine El Abidine Ben Ali
PSD

General elections were held in Tunisia on 20 March 1994 to elect a President and Chamber of Deputies. In the presidential election, incumbent Zine El Abidine Ben Ali was re-elected unopposed for a second five-year term; he was the only candidate to get endorsements from 30 political figures, as required by the Constitution. In the Chamber election, Ben Ali's Constitutional Democratic Rally won 144 seats in an expanded 163-seat Chamber with 97.1 percent of the vote; six other parties received two percent of the vote between them with four winning seats. It was the first time since Tunisia gained independence that the RCD would face any opposition MPs. Voter turnout was 95.47%.

== Results ==
=== President ===
Candidate	Party	Votes	%
Zine El Abidine Ben Ali	Constitutional Democratic Rally	2,987,375	100.00
Total		2,987,375	100.00
Valid votes		2,987,375	99.92
Invalid/blank votes		2,505	0.08
Total votes		2,989,880	100.00
Registered voters/turnout		3,150,612	94.90
Source: Nohlen et al.

=== Chamber of Deputies ===
Party	Votes	%	Seats	+/–
Constitutional Democratic Rally	2,768,667	97.73	144	+3
Movement of Socialist Democrats	30,660	1.08	10	+10
Ettajdid Movement	11,299	0.40	4	New
Unionist Democratic Union	9,152	0.32	3	+3
Popular Unity Party	8,391	0.30	2	+2
Social Liberal Party	1,892	0.07	0	0
Progressive Socialist Rally	1,749	0.06	0	New
Independents	1,061	0.04	0	0
Total	2,832,871	100.00	163	0
Valid votes	2,832,871	99.69		
Invalid/blank votes	8,686	0.31		
Total votes	2,841,557	100.00		
Registered voters/turnout	2,976,366	95.47		
Source: Nohlen et al.
