= Popular Unity Party (Tunisia) =

Popular Unity Party حزب الوحدة الشعبية
- French name: Parti de l'Unité Populaire
- Abbreviation: PUP
- President: Houssine El Hammemi
- Founded: January 1981
- Legalized: 19 November 1983
- Split from: Popular Unity Movement
- Headquarters: 37 Rue Palestine 1002, Tunis
- Ideology: Socialism; Arab nationalism
- Assembly of the Representatives of the People: 0 / 217

The Popular Unity Party (Arabic: حزب الوحدة الشعبية; French: Parti de l'Unité Populaire, PUP) is an Arab nationalist party in Tunisia.

== History and profile ==
The party was founded in 1981 as a breakaway from the left-wing Popular Unity Movement (MUP) by members who disagreed with MUP leader Ahmed Ben Salah's policy to boycott elections. In 1983, the government of Mohammed Mzali legalised two moderate oppositional parties, including the PUP.

The party won two seats in the general election held on 20 March 1994.

Following the elections of 1999, the PUP had seven members in the Tunisian parliament. At the 2004 legislative elections, the party won 3.6% of the popular vote and 11 out of 189 seats. The same day, its candidate Mohamed Bouchiha, won 3.8% at the presidential elections. In 2006, the PUP tried to form an alliance with three other minor oppositional parties, the Social Liberal Party (PSL), the Unionist Democratic Union (UDU) and the Green Party for Progress (PVP). However, the alliance quickly collapsed when some of the participants were accused of pursuing particular interests rather than unity of the opposition. At the 2009 legislative elections, the PUP won 3.4% of the popular vote and 12 out of 214 seats.

After the Tunisian revolution of 2011, the PUP participated in elections for the Constituent Assembly, but failed to win any seats.

The party has published a weekly newspaper under the title of Al Wahada.
