= Hassib Ben Ammar =

Tunisian politician and journalist

- حسيب بن عمار
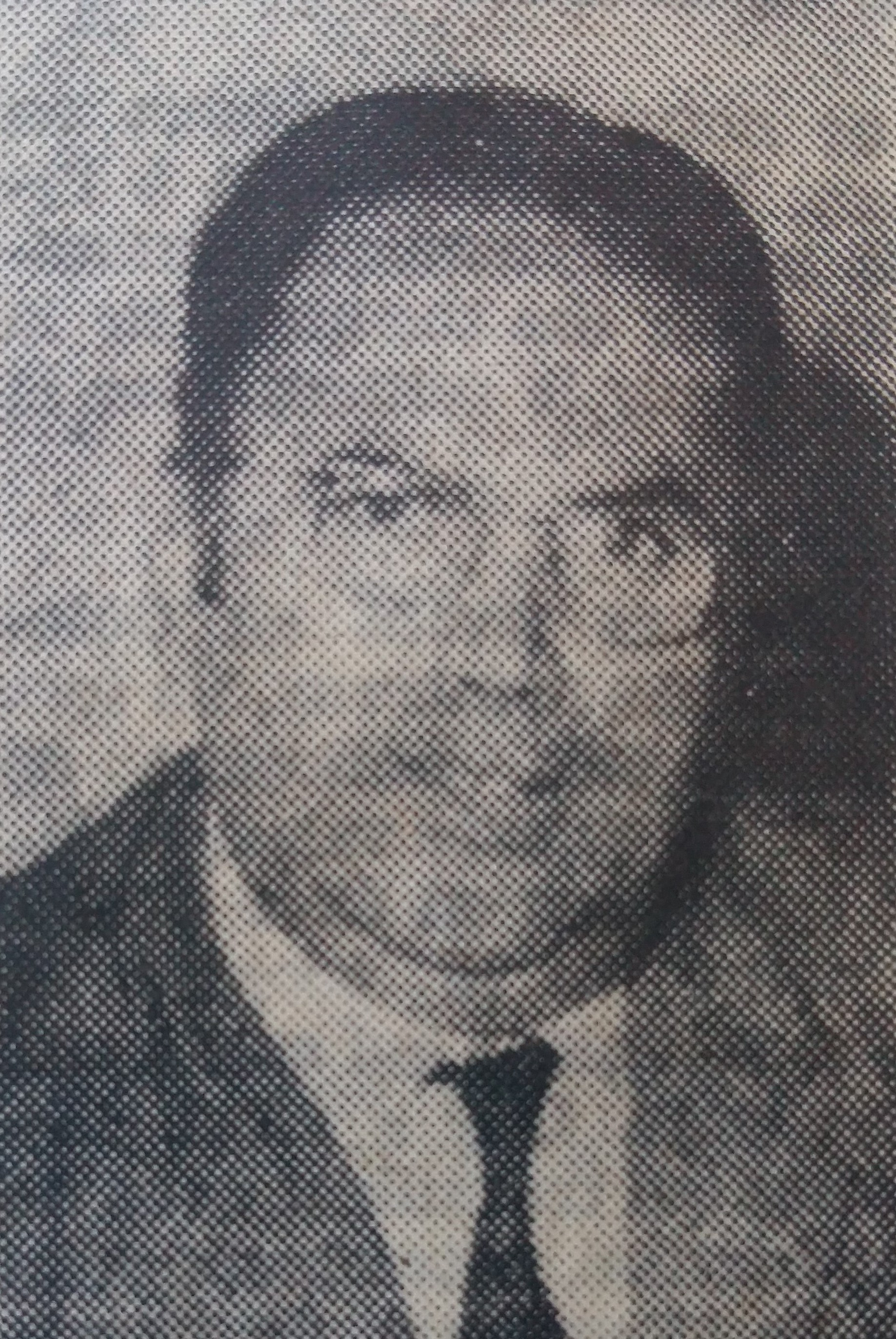

7th Minister of Defence
- In office June 1970 – October 1971
- Prime Minister: Bahi Ladgham; Hedi Amara Nouira
- Preceded by: Beji Caid Essebsi
- Succeeded by: Béchir M'hedhbi

21st Mayor of Tunis
- In office 1963–1969
- Preceded by: Ahmed Zaouche
- Succeeded by: Fouad Mebazaa

Provincial governor (Tunis region)
- In office July 1965 – September 1969

Personal details
- Born: 11 April 1924 Tunis
- Died: 15 December 2008 (aged 84) Tunis
- Party: Socialist Destourian Party
- Spouse: Hayet Ferjani
- Children: 1d, 3s

Hassib Ben Ammar (Arabic: حسيب بن عمار; 11 April 1924 – 15 December 2008) was a leading Tunisian politician and journalist/editor. He was a powerful campaigner for human rights.

== Life ==
=== Politician ===
As a young man he participated actively in the Tunisian independence struggle, notably as the producer of the clandestine newspaper "El Hilal".

Following national independence, in 1961 he was appointed to preside over the "National office of Mines". On 2 February 1961 he took part in the Constitutional Congress in Tunisia's newly established Chamber of Commerce: the 24 member steering committee elected Ben Ammar as their first president.

Subsequently he occupied a succession of senior positions in public life: he was head of the youth wing of the Socialist Destourian Party, and was governor of the Tunis governate (province) from July 1965 till September 1969. Ben Ammar served as the mayor of Tunis between 1963 and 1969. In 1967, at a time when he was himself combining the duties of provincial governor and city mayor, he founded the Association for the care of the Medina in Tunis (Association de sauvegarde de la médina de Tunis), serving as the association's president till 1969.

Ben Ammar was provisionally appointed Tunisian Ambassador to Italy following a dispute with Ahmed Ben Salah on the subject of Cooperatives, before being appointed director of the Socialist Destourian Party, a post he held between 27 September 1969 and 23 June 1970. He became the Minister for National Defence in June 1970, in succession to Beji Caid Essebsi. However, he remained in this post only till October 1971, which was when he resigned in response to the refusal of President Bourguiba to democratize the Socialist Destourian Party (PSD / Parti socialiste destourien ): he was replaced at the Defence ministry by Béchir M'hedhbi.

=== Human rights activist and newspaper man ===
Excluded from the PSD during the 1970s, Hassib Ben Ammar resigned from his political posts in order to participate with Ahmed Mestiri in building the nascent opposition movement emerging from the Movement of Socialist Democrats (MDS / Mouvement des démocrates socialistes ). In 1977, he was also a co-founder of the Tunisian Human Rights League, becoming an honorary president of this association.

He was also president of the "Committee of Freedoms" (sometimes known as the "National Council for Public Freedoms") which originated as a demand for respect of civil liberties, and for a conference on freedoms and human rights. The demand was signed by 528 intellectuals (university teachers, doctors, lawyers etc.) and distributed in April 1977. Ben Ammar undertook an overseas tour to invite foreign Human Rights organisations to participate. The conference itself, despite being forbidden, eventually took place on 9 June 1977. It took place not in the Hotel Africa as planned, but in the main concourse of Tunis–Carthage International Airport. One high-profile participant was United States Attorney General Ramsey Clark.

Hassib Ben Ammar on the newspaper, "Erraï", which he launched

"We opened our columns to everyone. Even to Rashid al-Ghannushi (Islamist) and to Mohamed Harmel (Communist), while not supporting their positions. We did this in the name of free expression. I even published an editorial which defended the extremists.

"Nous avons ouvert nos colonnes à tous. Même à Rachid Ghannouchi (islamiste) et à Mohamed Harmel (communiste), alors que nous n'épousions pas leurs positions. Cela au nom de la liberté d'expression. J'ai même publié un éditorial qui prenait la défense des intégristes"

In 1977 Ben Ammar launched Tunisia's first independent newspaper, Erraï (Opinion), which he described as "a contribution to the spreading of democratic ideas".

In 1978 launched the French language weekly (or monthly: sources differ) publication, "Democracy", as a published medium for the opposition Movement of Socialist Democrats, becoming the publication's director. The opposition party was at this time illegal and he found himself confronted by the authorities with more than twenty legal cases.

In December 1987, a few weeks after President Zine El Abidine Ben Ali came to power, Ben Ammar closed down Erraï. Sources close to the newspaper claimed that the new President was enraged by the publication of an article by Oum Zied entitled "The drift towards authoritarianism of the Ben Ali régime," banned the edition containing the article and launched a campaign of intimidation against Ben Ammar, which allegedly forced him to put an end to the publication.

Also at the end of 1987, on December 15, the president appointed him to membership of the recently established Constitutional Council. Additionally, at this time he was a co-founder with the support of Ben Ali of "The Arab Institute of Human Rights", which was based in Tunis and of which he became the first president.

Between 1994 and 1995 Ben Ammar served on the Committee of the United Nations Convention against Torture. The President also appointed him to the Higher Committee on Human Rights and Fundamental Liberties, and he has served on the board of the Association for the Prevention of Torture.

=== Family ===
He was the son of Salah Ben Ammar and the brother of Radhia Haddad, Married to Hayet Ferjani, he has a daughter, Zeineb, and three sons, Kais, Khalil and Maher.

== Death ==
Hassib Ben Ammar died on 15 December 2008. His funeral, which took place at Jellaz Cemetery on the edge of Tunis, was attended by an impressive range of leading establishment and opposition officials, national and city dignitaries, together with fellow human rights advocates. The funeral oration was given by Fouad Mebazaa, who was at that time the president of the national Chamber of Deputies, but he delivered the speech at the direction of President Ben Ali himself. The president also addressed a fulsome message of condolences and compassion directly to the bereaved family.

In 2011, street no.8811 in Tunis was renamed in his honor.

== Awards and recognision ==
- 1992 UNESCO Prize for Human Rights Advocacy received by Ben Ammar on behalf of the Arab Institute of Human Rights
- 1993 United Nations Human Rights Prize on the 45th anniversary of the Universal Declaration of Human Rights
- 1993 President's Prize for Human Rights
- Order of 7 November from The President

In 2011 Road Number 8811 in Tunis was renamed after Hassib Ben Ammar.

=== Distinctions ===
Grand Officer of the Tunisian Order of Independence (1968)
