= Al Rai =

Al Rai or Alrai (Arabic: الرأي, lit. 'The opinion') may refer to:

- Al Rai (Kuwaiti newspaper), a Kuwaiti newspaper
- Al Ra'i (Jordanian newspaper), a Jordanian newspaper
- Erraï, defunct Tunisian weekly newspaper (1977–1987)

Transliterated from Arabic: الراعي, it may also refer to:

- Alrai, traditional Arabic name of Gamma Cephei, a binary star system in the constellation Cepheus
- al-Rai, Syria, a town in Aleppo Governorate, northern Syria
