= Radhia Haddad =

Tunisian activist

- راضية الحداد
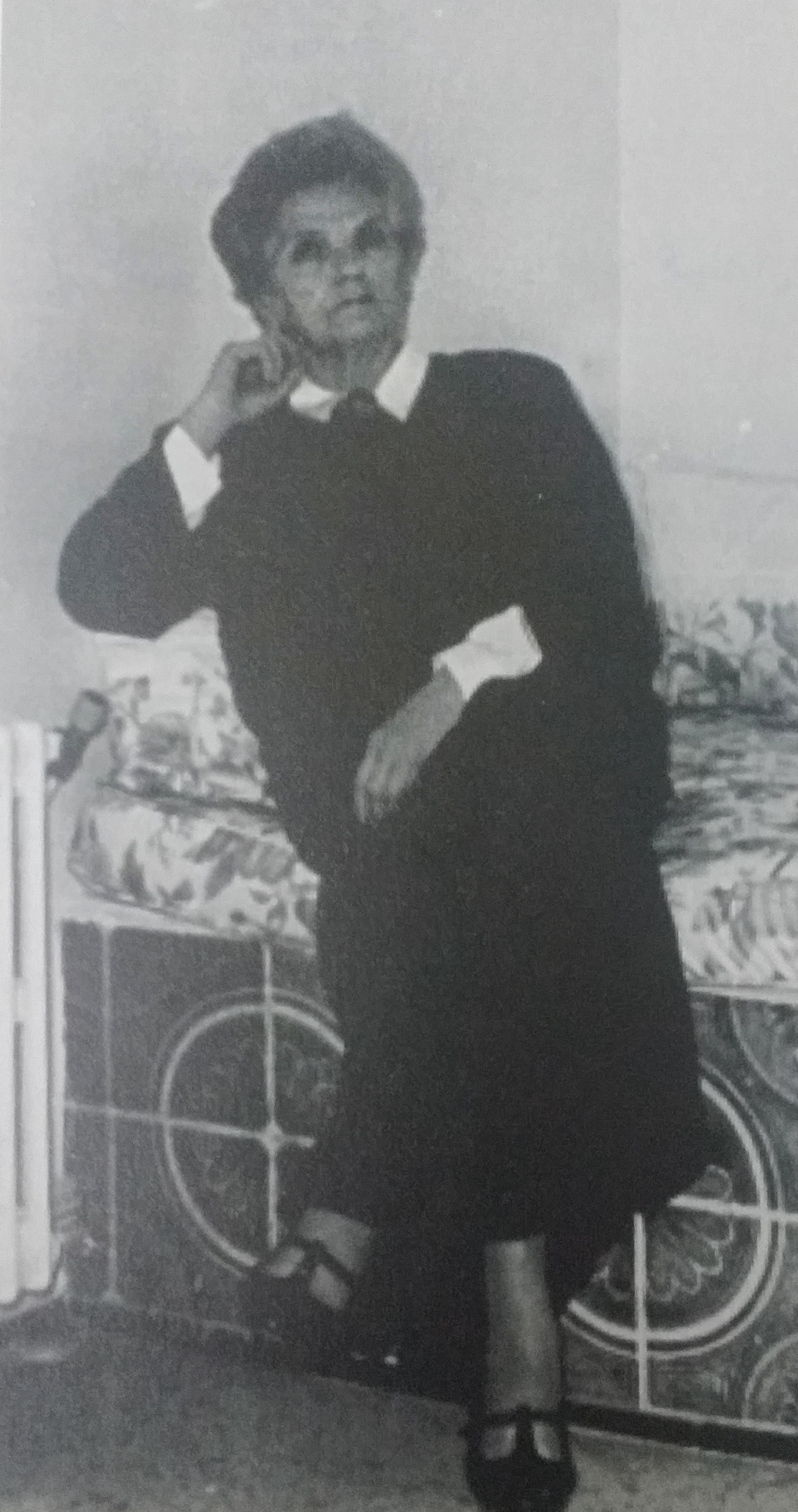

Member of the Tunisian Chamber of Deputies
- In office 1959–1974
- Constituency: Tunis

Personal details
- Born: Radhia Ben Ammar; March 17, 1922 Tunis, Tunisia
- Died: October 20, 2003 (aged 81) Carthage, Tunisia
- Party: Neo Destour; Socialist Destourian Party
- Relatives: Hassib Ben Ammar (brother)

Radhia Haddad (Arabic: راضية الحداد) (March 17, 1922 – October 20, 2003) was a Tunisian feminist activist, and former chairperson of the National Union of Tunisian Women for fifteen years.

== Biography ==
Born Radhia Ben Ammar (Arabic: راضية بن عمار) on March 17, 1922, she was the daughter of Salah Ben Ammar. She grew up in a family of traditional Tunisian bourgeois intellectuals. She had her primary studies in French at the French School of Franceville, but, as a girl, she was forced by her parents to leave school at twelve years old after obtaining her primary school certificate. She later wrote that priority in education was given to the males in her family: complaining that "no sacrifice was deemed too great to facilitate the studies of my brothers".

Nevertheless, she pursued Arabic language courses at home and learned a lot from her brother, the future politician and activist for human rights Hassib Ben Ammar, with whom she often discussed reading his college books. Radhia Haddad, compelled to wear the traditional Tunisian dressing of the face veil, revolted and refused to leave the house. She took advantage of house calls made to their house by the family doctor, Abderhaman Mami, whenever someone fell ill, to discuss political activities of the Destour and Neo-Destour political parties in Tunisia.
