= Mohamed Harmel =

Tunisian politician

First secretary of the Ettajdid Movement
- In office 23 April 1993 – 30 July 2007
- Preceded by: (post newly created)
- Succeeded by: Ahmed Brahim

First secretary of the Tunisian Communist Party
- In office February 1981 – 23 April 1993
- Preceded by: Mohamed Nafaâ
- Succeeded by: (post abolished)

Personal details
- Born: November 1929 Tunis
- Died: 18 September 2011 (aged 81) Tunis
- Spouse: y
- Children: y

Mohamed Harmel (محمد حرمل) (November 1929 – 18 September 2011) was a Tunisian politician.

Between 1981 and 1993 he served as First Secretary of the Tunisian Communist Party, and in 2007 he became an honorary president of the Ettajdid Movement. He was a member of the country's Chamber of Advisors (Upper legislative assembly) from 2008 till its dissolution in March 2011.

== Life ==
=== Early years ===
Quotation

"I was never a Destorian. I became active in the national independence movement without joining any party, and after that I heard people discussing the Communist Party. I read Marx and in 1948 I joined up, body and soul, to the Communist Party ...."
« Je n'ai jamais été destourien, j'ai commencé à militer dans le mouvement national sans jamais adhérer à aucun parti, puis j'ai entendu parler du Parti communiste, j'ai lu Marx et j'ai adhéré, en 1948, corps et âme, au Parti communiste .... »

Mohamed Harmel

Born into an artisan "chaouchi" Tunis family, Harmel studied at the city's Sadiki College. During this period he engaged politically with the Tunisian Communist Party, and distributed leaflets in support of Tunisian independence.

He was arrested in September 1949 following a street demonstration organised by the "Tunisian Committee for Liberty and Peace", and held for several months in the (non-military) prison in Tunis. In May 1951, at the fourth party congress of the Communist Party, he was elected a member of the Party Central Committee.

Quotation

"At the same time as being happy about the independence, I immediately found myself in political opposition because I was not a member of the [ruling] Destorian party. Political cohabitation with the Destorians immediately became problematic when they took power after leading the independence struggle, and became ever more hegemonistic and intolerant .... "
« Tout en étant heureux de l'indépendance, je me suis retrouvé d'emblée dans l'opposition parce que n'appartenant pas au Néo-Destour. Il s'est tout de suite posé un problème de cohabitation avec le Néo-Destour, qui prenait le pouvoir après avoir dirigé la lutte, et était de plus en plus hégémonique et intolérant.... »

Mohamed Harmel recalling the political aftermath of Tunisian independence in 1956

Following a study period at a teacher training college, in 1951 he embarked on a teaching career at Djebel Abiod (as it was then known) and in other towns. He pursued his teaching career when possible till 1956, but the years were not entirely without incident for him in other respects. He was arrested in February 1952 at Béja during a demonstration against the deportation of Nationalist and Communist leaders, and sent to the detention camp at Téboursouk. Released in 1953, he took charge in 1954 of the journal "Sawt el Oumma" ("Voice of the nation"), and then found himself back in prison after inciting dock workers to boycott a French ship transporting military equipment. This time he was released only when the French president, Pierre Mendès France visited Tunisia on 31 July 1954, as part of what turned out to be the buildup to a peaceful transition to Tunisian independence less than two years later. Recalling these experiences much later in his life, Hamel explained that he had been "processed through the military court" and "could have been given a death sentence", adding that "the mood often became heated between Destorian and Communists during [their] imprisonment at Téboursouk, and later, each time they encountered each other while leafleting in the streets.

=== Party office ===
In May 1956, at the fifth congress of the Tunisian Communist Party, he was elected to the party politburo and secretariat. In 1957 his name was at the top of the party's candidate list in the Tunis electoral district for the municipal elections. In January 1963, after a plot to assassinate the president was uncovered, the Communist party was banned and Harmel was arrested in the same month, along with other members of the party leadership, Abdelhamid Ben Mustapha and Hédi Jrad. A few months later they were released. Discussing the matter later Harmel said that Habib Bourguiba had accused them of having supported the 1962 assassination plot, even though he would have been strongly opposed to it.

=== Exile and party ban ===
In 1963 Hamel embarked on a lengthy period abroad, spending time in France, Prague and Moscow, in order to recover his health and "preserve his life" ("gagner [sa] vie") as he would put it. After an eight-year exile he returned to Tunisia in 1971.

Mohamed Harmel was elected Party First Secretary in February 1981 at the eighth party congress. The congress took place under conditions of secrecy because the Communist Party was still banned.

=== The ban lifted ===
Harmel recalled later a conversation he had with President Bourguiba on 18 July 1981 at Skanès (Monastir). Harmel had requested the meeting in order to thank the president for having lifted the country's eighteen-year ban on Communist publications. Bourguiba asked what had become of the Communists, who had been so much a part of the Tunisian political landscape in the 1940s and 1950s. "We are no longer visible, Mt President, because you decided to ban Communist Party activities". After a few seconds of reflection Bourguiba replied, in magisterial terms, that the ban should be lifted at once. Later on the same day the ban on the Tunisian Communist Party was lifted.

On 7 October 1981 Harmel founded Attariq Al Jadid ("The new path"), a weekly tabloid newspaper. At this stage the paper was the official organ of the Tunisian Communist Party and Harmel, as party secretary, became its first director. Despite periodic government bans, the newspaper would outlive the Tunisian Communist Party itself, banned permanently by the government only in 2009. Meanwhile, the party's ninth party congress was able to be held openly in Tunis in June 1987: Harmel was re-elected to the post of First Secretary.

=== Leader of Ettajdid ===
The Tunisian Communist Party reinvented itself as the Ettajdid Movement (Movement for Renewal / حركة التجديد) in 1993. In addition to the rebranding, the change seems to have involved the abandonment of certain old Communist dogmas and a more accommodating attitude to the mainstream Tunisian political establishment. Harmel's presence in a leading position within the new movement was nevertheless a mark of continuity. He was elected and served as a deputy in the legislative assembly between 1994 and 1999. At one stage he became President of the Commission for Parliamentary Immunity, in the process becoming the first opposition deputy to become president of a commission.

Quotation

"I was one of those who helped build national consensus around President Ben Ali: how could I now present myself as his rival, how could I support or vote for anyone competing with a man whom I am convinced is best able to conduct the country's affairs?"
« J'ai participé au renforcement du consensus national autour du président Ben Ali; comment pourrais-je alors me présenter comme son concurrent, comment pourrais-je soutenir ou voter pour une personne qui ferait concurrence à un homme que je considère sincèrement et avec conviction le mieux à même de conduire les affaires du pays11 ? »

Mohamed Harmel explaining his disinclination to stand for presidential office in 1999

Quotation

"This sort of side-lining began with the non-publication by the Attariq Al Jadid special edition of my piece for the opening of the [2007] party congress; and when the next edition appeared after the congress my two pieces had been left out. Today, keen to renew my contribution to the newspaper, I proposed to provide the editor with two pieces each week, one of them in Arabic and one in French. But the management imposed conditions regarding my contribution."
«Cette sorte de mise à l'écart a commencé par la non publication de mon allocution d'ouverture des travaux du congrès dans le numéro spécial d'Ettarik El Jedid [Attariq Al Jadid], consacré au congrès, et quand la nouvelle série du journal est parue après le congrès mes deux rubriques ont été supprimées. Aujourd'hui, désirant renouveler ma contribution dans le journal, j'ai proposé d'assurer la rédaction d'une rubrique hebdomadaire une fois en arabe et une fois en français. Mais la direction du journal a posé des conditions quant à ma contribution. »

Mohamed Harmel explaining in 2008 why he no longer wrote for the party newspaper.

The 1999 presidential election was subject to an upper age limit of 70, which debarred him from standing, but Harmel asserted that he would not have stood for president even if he had been permitted to do so. Instead he unequivocally backed Ben Ali for re-election.

The ongoing theme of his politics was "consensual democracy": voters were reminded of the importance of the "gains of 7 November" in the Ettajdid electoral manifesto for the 1999 legislature elections. This was a reference to the coming to power as president on that date of Zine El Abidine Ben Ali. For the 2004 presidential election Mohamed Harmel was again debarred from standing on account of his age. He was 75. He did participate in that year's elections for the legislature, but failed to be re-elected despite his name appearing at the top of the Ettajdid party list for the Tunis electoral district. Following this disappointing result the Ettajdid national executive issued a communiqué on 12 December lamenting the "exclusion" of their party general secretary from the National Assembly as damaging to the pluralism in the chamber. According to the historian Larbi Chouikha this communiqué contained echoes of the 1990s when the Communist Party was advocating "consensual democracy" combined with power.

=== Final years ===
Mohamed Harmel stood down as Ettajdid Party Secretary at the party conference of 30 July 2007: he was succeeded by Ahmed Brahim. He was immediately proclaimed, and unanimously elected, Honorary Party President, which was a post expressly created to mark the movement's appreciation of the historic scope of his political contributions. According to Brahim, interviewed a few months later, it was Harmel who had himself wanted this change at the top of the party, having in effect already let it be known that he would not be standing for re-election.

Elsewhere, however, there are signs that he was not entirely relaxed about losing power and influence within the movement. Directly before the congress of July 2007 he prepared two pieces for the party newspaper, Attariq Al Jadid. These were headed, "In all candour" in the Arab language section and "Question mark" in the francophone section. They were not included in the special Party Congress edition of the paper, and in an open letter to readers published in August 2008 Harmel explained why he had not written for the paper again, because of management conditions imposed in respect of his contributions.

In 2007 he insisted in an interview that he had laid down all control organisational responsibility of his own will, also explaining that the 2007 party congress had never specified the nature of his role as Honorary Party President, which some had been content to leave as a fudge in a way that was less than comradely and that shocked him. But he insisted that he was nevertheless not riled by the situation. The choices had been his own, made with a good conscience, and it was "normal" that others would take over.

In 2008 President Ben Ali appointed him to the Chamber of Advisors, which was the upper house under Tunisia's bicameral legislative structure. The category under which he was nominated was that of "personalities and national experts" ("personnalités et les compétences nationales") which meant that he took the seat vacated by the lawyer, Habib Achour.

Mohamed Harmel died on 18 September 2011. Paying tribute, his successor Ahmed Brahim declared that Tunisia had lost a great patriot and great fighter in the service of the people, for democracy and progress.
