= Democratic Modernist Pole =

Tunisian political coalition

The Modernist Democratic Pole (Arabic: القطب الديمقراطي الحداثي) (French: Pôle démocratique moderniste) (PDM) was a Tunisian political coalition created for the Tunisian Constituent Assembly election of 23 October 2011. The "Pole" consisted of four parties and five citizen initiatives, the largest of which is the Ettajdid Movement. However, an 18 October report by Bloomberg.com states that "attempts by ... the Modernist Democratic Pole, to create a pre-election multiparty coalition failed."

The bloc was founded in May 2011. On 7 September it announced candidate lists for the Constituent Assembly election in all the 33 constituencies at home and abroad. Sixteen women and 17 men will be chief candidates. Riadh Ben Fadl and Mustapha Ben Ahmed, are the founders of the group. Ahmed Ibrahim is a leader in the bloc. The bloc won 5 of the 217 seats and 4.91% of the vote in the 2011 Tunisian Constituent Assembly election. Three of the parties in the coalition: the Republican Party, the Socialist Left Party and the Social Democratic Path) became part of another coalition called the Union for Tunisia in 2013.

== Positions ==
According to Islamopedia, the bloc officially released its campaign platform on 24 September 2011. The bloc proposes the separation of religion and politics and in contrast to traditional Islamic Sharia law emphasises gender equality, with half its election lists headed by female candidates, and its platform promoting ‘perfect equality’ in inheritance law. The party also supports the abolition of the death penalty.

For Tunisia's constitution, PDM proposes a president elected to five-year terms in office and serving a maximum of two terms. In the Constituent Assembly, it proposes that laws and decisions be based on a majority vote, except for constitutional changes, which would require a two-thirds majority vote.

== Components of the pole ==
Four parties:

- Ettajdid Movement (mouvement Ettajdid).
- Socialist Left Party (Parti socialiste de gauche).
- Centrist Way (Voie du Centre).
- Republican Party (Parti républicain ).

Five independent initiatives:

- Pole's National Collective of Independents (Collectif national des indépendant(e)s du pôle).
- Citizens' Initiative (Initiative citoyenne).
- Pole's League of Independents (Ligue des indépendants du pôle).
- Enough divisions, let's move forward! (Assez de divisions, allons de l'avant).
- Call for a democratic, social and cultural pole (Appel pour un pôle démocratique, social et culturel).

== See also ==
- List of political parties in Tunisia
- 2011 Tunisian Constituent Assembly election
