= Erraï =

Arab language newspaper in Tunis, 1977–1987

Erraï (الرأي meaning "Opinion") is a weekly Arab language newspaper which was published in Tunis between December 1977 and December 1987.

Hassib Ben Ammar on Erraï:

"We opened our columns to everyone. Even to Rashid al-Ghannushi (Islamist) and to Mohamed Harmel (Communist), while not supporting their positions. We did this in the name of free expression. I even published an editorial which defended fundamentalists.

"Nous avons ouvert nos colonnes à tous. Même à Rachid Ghannouchi (islamiste) et à Mohamed Harmel (communiste), alors que nous n'épousions pas leurs positions. Cela au nom de la liberté d'expression. J'ai même publié un éditorial qui prenait la défense des intégristes"

The newspaper was launched by Hassib Ben Ammar, a leading Tunisian politician and journalist/editor. He was a powerful campaigner for human rights. Ben Ammar had co-founded the Tunisian Human Rights League in 1976, and he described the newspaper, at its launch, as "a contribution to the dissemination of democratic ideas".

In December 1987, a few weeks after Zine El Abidine Ben Ali took power, Ben Ammar scuttled the newspaper, of which at this time he was the director. Writing under her pseudonym, Om Ziad (أم زياد), the journalist Naziha Réjiba used the pages of Erraï to warn readers, "Do not be in too much of a hurry to applaud Ben Ali. Do not forget his military past, nor his background with the police. And what if he takes us down a path even worse than his predecessor's? Do not give him a blank check!".

The article would enrage the newly installed president, who placed a ban on the edition in question and launched a campaign of intimidation against Hassib Ben Ammar who was cornered into putting an end to the newspaper's publication.
