= 1999 Tunisian general election =

General elections were held in Tunisia on 24 October 1999 to elect a President and Chamber of Deputies. For the first time ever there was more than one candidate in the presidential election; the longstanding requirement for prospective candidates to get at least 30 endorsements had been lifted months earlier. However, incumbent Zine El Abidine Ben Ali easily won a third five-year term with a reported 99.4 percent of the vote. His Constitutional Democratic Rally won 148 of the 183 seats in the Chamber of Deputies. Voter turnout was allegedly 92%.

== Results ==
=== President ===
Candidate	Party	Votes	%
Zine El Abidine Ben Ali	Constitutional Democratic Rally	3,269,067	99.45
Mohemed Belhaj Amor	Popular Unity Party	10,492	0.32
Abderrahmane Tlili	Unionist Democratic Union	7,662	0.23
Total		3,287,221	100.00
Valid votes		3,287,221	99.73
Invalid/blank votes		8,799	0.27
Total votes		3,296,020	100.00
Registered voters/turnout		3,605,942	91.41
Source: Geisser

=== Parliament ===
Party	Votes	%	Seats	+/–
Constitutional Democratic Rally	2,831,030	91.59	148	+4
Movement of Socialist Democrats	98,550	3.19	13	+3
Popular Unity Party	52,054	1.68	7	+5
Unionist Democratic Union	52,612	1.70	7	+4
Ettajdid Movement	32,220	1.04	5	+1
Social Liberal Party	15,024	0.49	2	+2
Progressive Socialist Rally	5,835	0.19	0	0
Independents	3,737	0.12	0	0
Total	3,091,062	100.00	182	+19
Valid votes	3,091,062	99.71		
Invalid/blank votes	9,036	0.29		
Total votes	3,100,098	100.00		
Registered voters/turnout	3,387,542	91.51		
Source: Geisser, IPU
