= 2011 Tunisian Constituent Assembly election =

- 23 October 2011

All 217 seats in the Constituent Assembly 109 seats needed for a majority
- Turnout: 49.41%
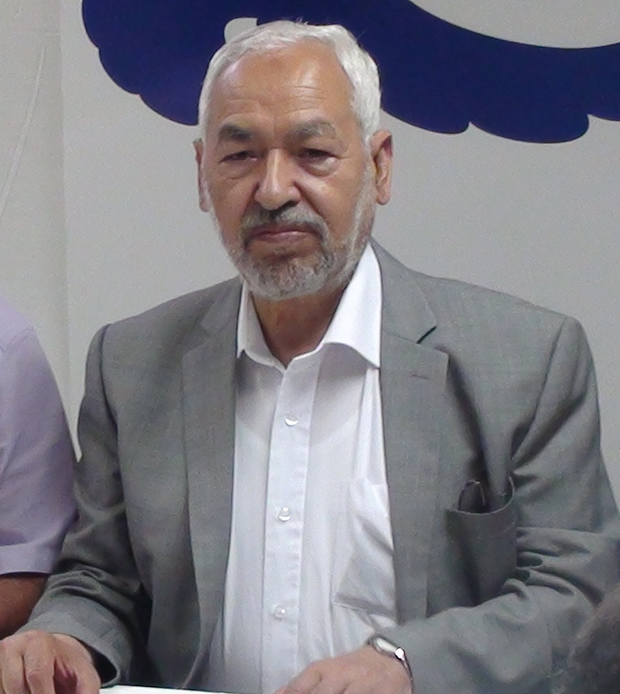

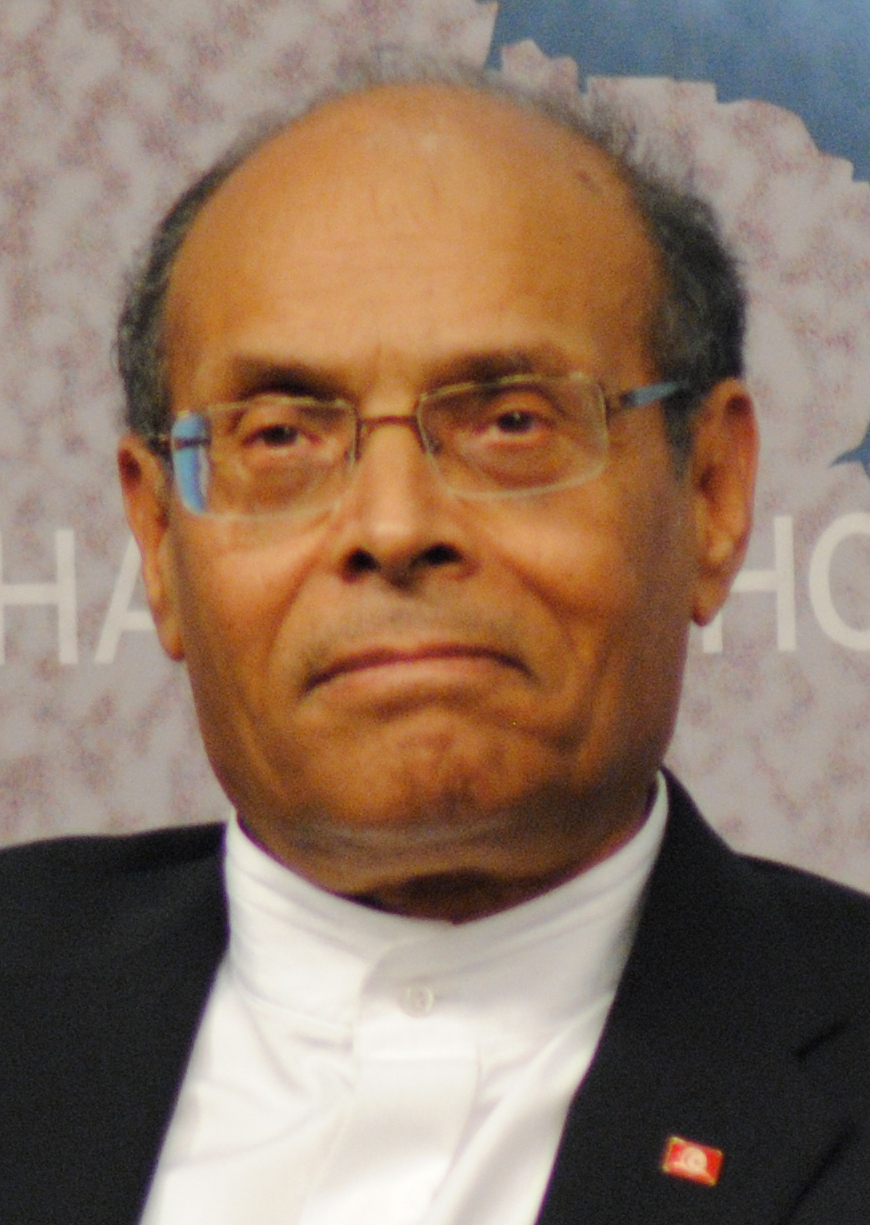

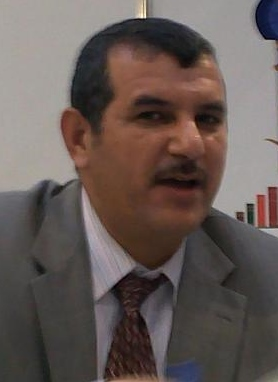

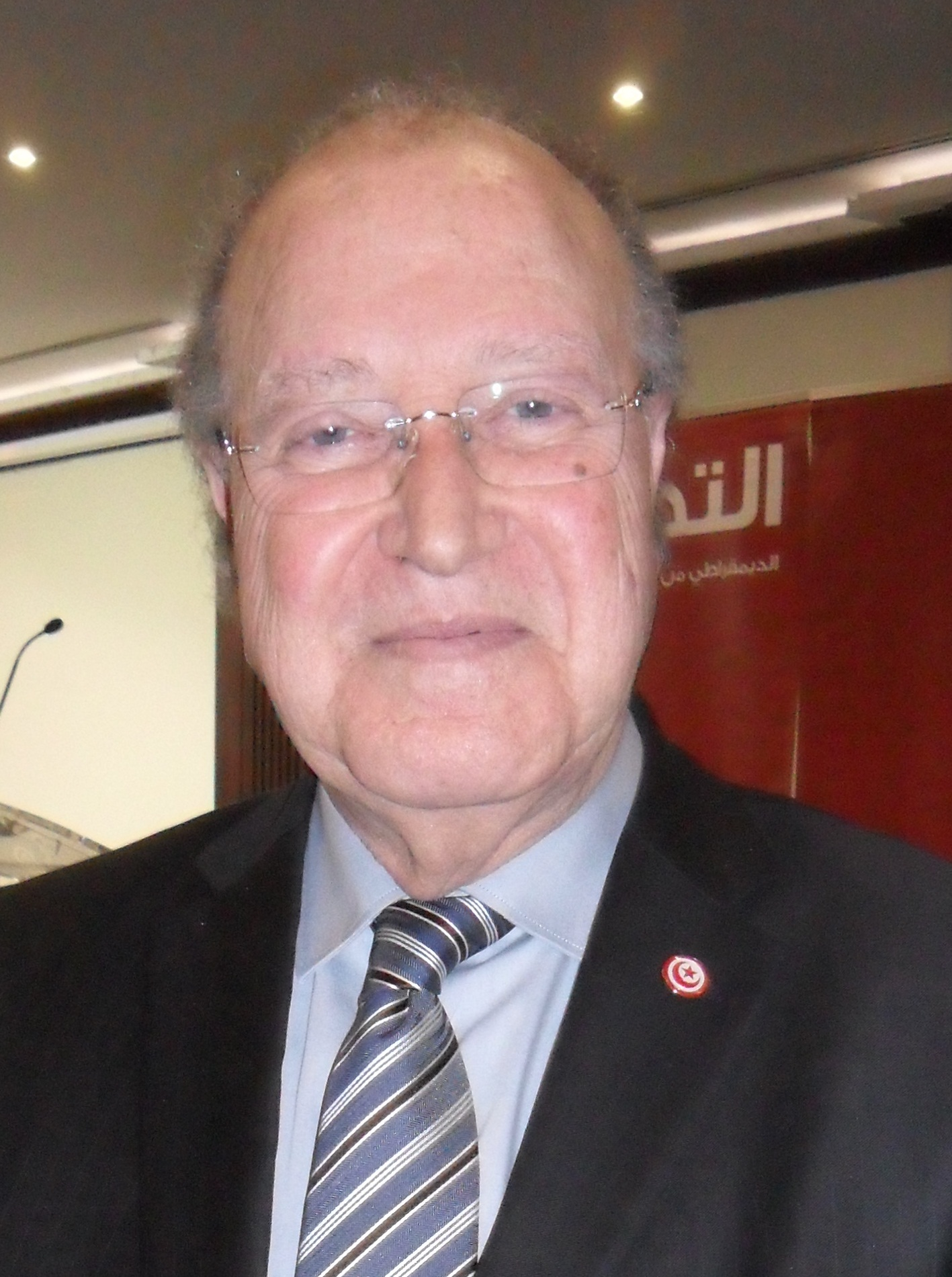

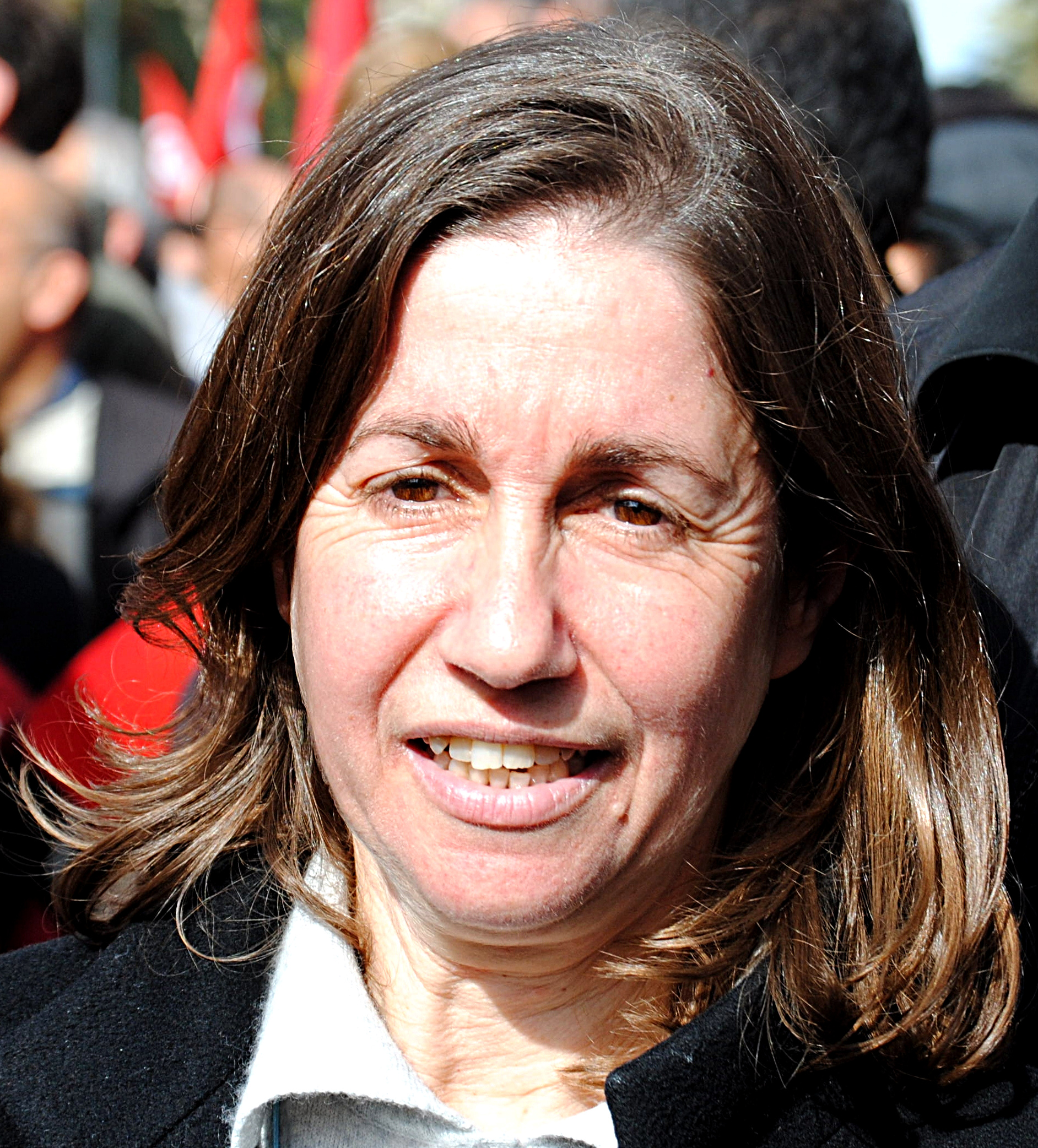
	First party	Second party	Third party
Leader	Rached Ghannouchi	Moncef Marzouki	Mohamed Hechmi Hamdi
Party	Ennahda	CPR	Popular Petition
Seats won	89	29	26
Popular vote	1,498,905	352,825	280,382
Percentage	36.97%	8.70%	6.92%
	Fourth party	Fifth party
Leader	Mustapha Ben Jafar	Maya Jribi
Party	Ettakatol	PDP
Seats won	20	16
Popular vote	285,530	160,692
Percentage	7.04%	3.96%
Prime Minister before election
Béji Caïd Essebsi
Independent
Elected Prime Minister
Hamadi Jebali
Ennahda

An election for a constituent assembly in Tunisia was announced on 3 March 2011 and held on 23 October 2011, following the Tunisian revolution, a part of the Arab Spring uprisings. The Assembly had 217 members. It was the first free election held in Tunisia since the country's independence in 1956, as well as the first election in the Arab world after the start of the Arab Spring.

The result was announced after counting began on 25 October 2011, and Ennahda won a plurality of votes.

== Background ==
The dictatorship of Zine El Abidine Ben Ali, which started in 1987, ended in January 2011 with Ban-Ali fleeing to Saudi Arabia and his regime crumbling.

A committee was formed to set the electoral rules for the country's first fair election. It consisted of leaders of political parties, labor unions and civil society organizations, chosen by improvisation. The committee chose closed list proportional representation, using the Hare quota and the largest remainder method, and set other rules. Within a few years, knowledge of which committee members favored the chosen system or alternatives and why was lost, except a vague recollection that the system was chosen as being inclusive to less-popular groups. Hare, being larger than Droop, means that more-popular parties get fewer seats than smaller quotas such as Droop. The relatively large district magnitude, a number of districts having five to ten seats, means that less-popular groups also have more of a chance.

Senior party members of the disbanded former ruling party, the Constitutional Democratic Rally(RCD), were banned from standing in the election if they had been active in politics within the last ten years. Originally, the ban would have applied to all former senior party members (spanning 23 years instead of 10), but this was revised after protests by former RCD members.

The election campaign officially started on 1 October 2011 and continued until 20 October, 24 hours before polling. The election was held on 23 October 2011 and was the first competitive national election following the fall of the Ben Ali regime. Approximately 4.3 million of the estimated 8.2 million eligible voters participated. More than 11,000 candidates contested the 217 seats, and the election produced a fragmented assembly in which Ennahda won the largest number of seats, with 89.

== Electoral system ==
The voting system allocated seats through proportional representation within various multi-member districts on closed lists based on thresholds set as the quotient of votes cast divided by seats contested. Districts elected from one to ten members, with most electing five to ten.

Party lists were required to alternate between male and female candidates.

=== Domestic districts ===
Each member represented a district with approximately 60,000 inhabitants, in a country of 10.5 million. Each governorate of Tunisia was allocated a number of members based on population, with most governorates having just one district. The three largest governorates by population --Tunis, Sfax, and Nabeul, -- were given more than ten members so were each split into two electoral districts. Districts within Tunisia ranged in size from four to ten seats.

=== International districts ===
Eighteen of the 217 constituent assembly members represented Tunisians abroad. Almost a million Tunisians live abroad, with up to 500,000 Tunisians in France.

Polling for expatriate Tunisians took place in 80 countries around the world. Six districts were organized -- France, Tunisia's former colonial ruler, elected ten representatives; Italy three; Germany one; North America and the rest of Europe two; and other Arab states two.

Around 60,000 Tunisians living in Germany were eligible to vote. In Canada, where around 16,000 Tunisians live, voting took place at the Tunisian embassy in Ottawa, Ontario and the consulate in Montreal, Quebec. In the United States, where an estimated 14,500 Tunisian citizens live, polling took place in Washington, D.C., New York City, Miami, Houston, San Francisco, and Los Angeles. The United Kingdom contained 4,700 potential voters, and voting took place in Birmingham, Edinburgh, London and Manchester.

== Parties ==
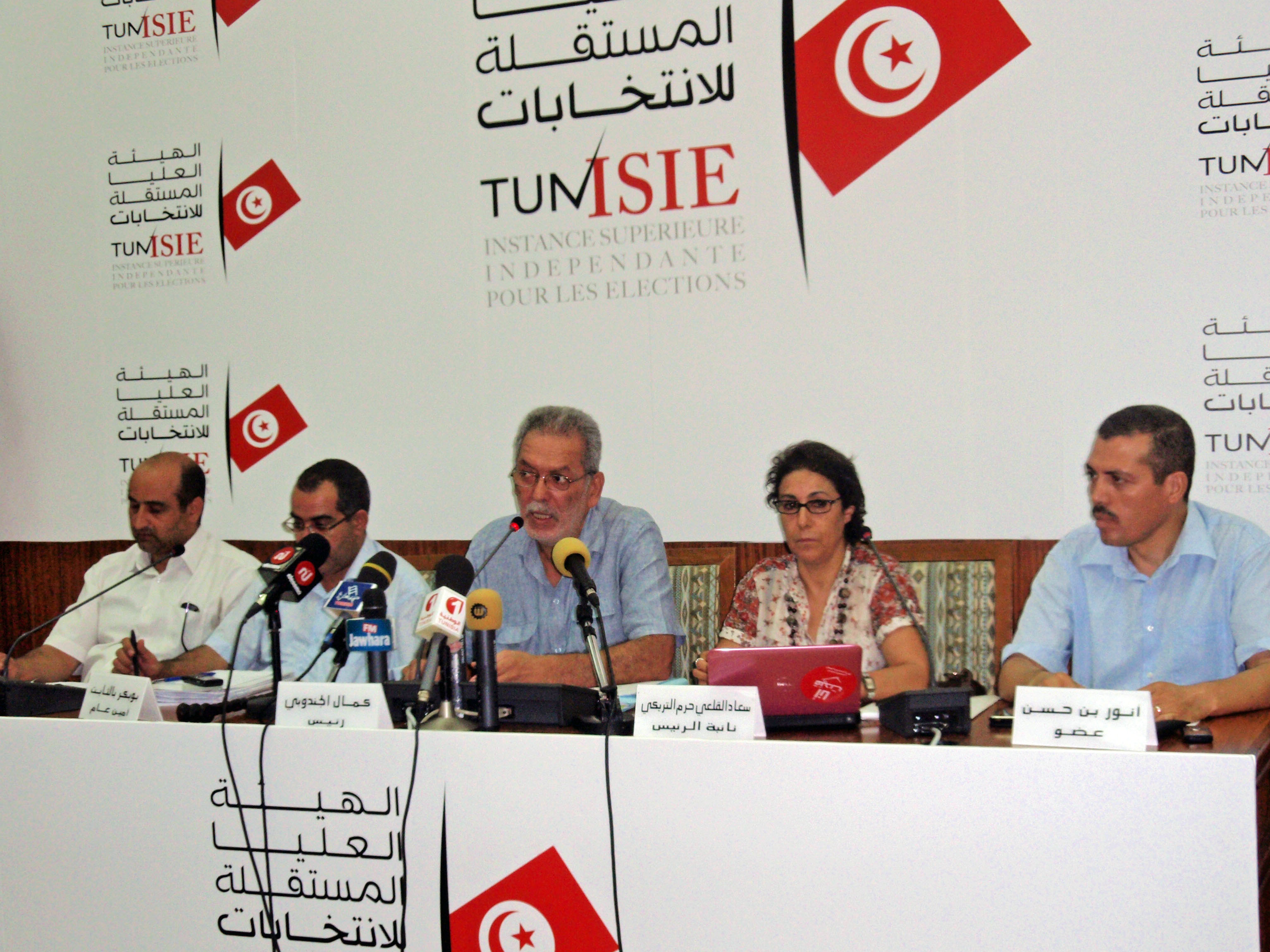
Press conference of the High and Independent Instance for the Elections in Tunisia, with Kamel Jendoubi (center)

- The largest and most organised party was the center-right and moderately Islamist Ennahda. Its platform included economic liberalism, as well as allowing Islam to have a greater presence in public life. Its leader Rachid Ghannouchi did not run in the election saying that he had no ambitions to be in government. Instead, General Secretary Hamadi Jebali ran as the prime ministerial candidate.
- The Congress for the Republic (CPR), centered around secularism and intellectual freedom.
- Ettakatol or FDTL, a secular social democratic party. Most of its support came from social media and grassroots volunteers.
- Al Aridha, the Popular Petition for Freedom, Justice and Development, a populist party.
- The Progressive Democratic Party (PDP) a secular, socially liberal, and economically centrist party, with leanings towards a mixed economy. Like Ennahda, it was well-funded and was able to run a nationwide campaign. The party benefitted from the support of the business community.
- The Al-Watan Party and The Initiative (Moubadara) emerged from the dissolved and banned Constitutional Democratic Rally (RCD) and represented key figures of the ousted Ben Ali regime.
- The Democratic Modernist Pole, a coalition led by the Ettajdid Movement, which is primarily focused on implementing political change. It is strongly anti-Islamist. Support for the coalition has dwindled due to infighting and an increase in support for other secular parties.
- Afek Tounes, a liberal center-right party with focus on secularism and civil liberties.
- A number of communist parties, by far the largest of which is the trade union-centered Tunisian Workers' Communist Party. Although they had only limited support, they were well organized and expected to win seats. A number of these far-left parties were centered around human rights and anti-globalisation.

== Issues ==
=== Secularism vs Islamism ===
The primary topic of discussion during the campaign was the role of secularism and Islam in public life. The repression of Islamists goes back to the days of Habib Bourguiba. After the fall of the Ben Ali government, the ban on the hijab in public institutions was lifted. Though Ennahda sought to establish an Islamic democracy guaranteeing civil freedoms and equality, some secularists claimed that the party would endanger civil rights if it came to power. Secularists were also alarmed at violent protests by religious conservatives against the broadcast of the film Persepolis (which depicted God, something considered blasphemous in Islam) by Nessma TV. Ennahda condemned the violence, but maintained that the film had "touched everything that is sacred for Tunisians".

=== Campaign finances ===
Another major issue was the role of campaign finances. The PDP alleged that Ennahda ran their campaign unfairly because, they claim, Ennahda received money from Gulf billionaires. However, Ennahda denied the claims and asserted that they simply used their money efficiently and fundraised more effectively due to having greater support. They pointed out that their moderate policies had alienated many people in the Gulf, who believed in radical Salafist and Wahhabi ideas. Others alleged that the pro-business PDP and smaller UPL (founded by a Libyan businessman born in Tunisia) had themselves received unfair funding, as they had the support of the rich native business community.

=== Form of government ===
As the Constituent Assembly had to decide on a new constitution for Tunisia, the contenders presented different proposals for the configuration of the new democratic system. The Ennahda Movement envisioned a parliamentary model with a strong prime minister, inspired by the United Kingdom or Germany. Conversely, at least the PDP and the CPR favoured a French-style semi-presidential republic.

== Observers ==
There were more than 10,000 domestic and 500 international observers for the election, some members of delegations from the Organization for Security and Co-operation in Europe, the European Union and the Carter Center.

== Polls ==
Opinion polls showed that a large part of the population had not chosen for whom to vote. Ennahda was consistently placed first, followed by the Progressive Democratic Party, the Democratic Forum for Labour and Liberties and the Congress for the Republic. In general, parties founded before the revolution scored better than post-revolutionary parties.

In a poll partly sponsored by Al Jazeera, 47% of the respondents said they strongly identified with Islamism, 19% with Arab nationalism and 19% with liberalism. Only 6% felt strongly in favour of communism or socialism, respectively. A poll released by Sigma on 10 September showed that 57% of respondents agreed with a referendum that could set a limit on the duration of the Assembly's mandate, while 18.6% were against; 24.3% did not know.

Although polling results varied from source to source, it was generally believed Ennahda would do well. Most previously undecided voters shifted towards the secular, center-left parties while Ennahda support remained steady. After early September, polls showed a close race between Ennahda and a potential coalition of secular parties.

Poll source	Date(s) administered	Sample size	Afek	Alwatan	CPR	Ennahda	Ettajdid/ PDM	Ettakatol	Initiative	MDS	PCOT	PDP	UPL	None
ANSAmed	5 March 2011	1,021	–	–	–	29%	7.5%	–	–	–	–	12.3%	–	61%
Al Jazeera	28 May – 2 June 2011	1,244	–	–	–	21.0%	–	–	–	–	5.0%	8.0%	–	54%
Emrhod	8 June 2011	1,000	–	–	7.3%	45.8%	11.1%	–	–	–	12.5%	20.3%	–	51%
Sigma	10 June 2011	1,014	0.9%	3.1%	3.0%	16.9%	1.0%	3.5%	0.4%	–	1.5%	9.5%	–	59.7%
3C Études	7 July 2011	?	–	–	–	14.3%	–	1.6%	–	–	0.8%	4.7%	–	67%
ISTIS	28 August 2011	2,717	0.82%	1.62%	1.26%	22.82%	1.37%	5.93%	1.09%	3.14%	2.28%	8.66%	0.83%	–
Sigma	10 September 2011	2,513	0.7%	3.1%	4.5%	22.8%	1.3%	9.2%	3.1%	–	0.8%	10.9%	1.7%	40%
HSS	22–24 Sep 2011	1,035	3%	3%	8%	25%	2%	14%	3%	–	3%	16%	3%	21%

== Controversies ==
=== Date of election ===
On 8 May 2011, interim prime minister Béji Caïd Essebsi voiced concerns that the election might have to be delayed. However, on 18 May 2011, the PM affirmed the election date would be adhered to. On 22 May 2011, the head of the country's independent electoral body Kamel Jendoubi suggested a delay to 16 October 2011, but this was rejected by the government, and few of the political parties running in the election were in favour of the postponement. Jendoubi insisted on the delay, stating that he needed more time to prepare electoral lists and renew over 400,000 old identity cards, but the final decision would rest with the interim president.

The delay proved to be a controversial issue, with the Ennahda Movement withdrawing from the National Council for the Safeguarding of the Revolution until the election date issue was resolved.

The election, originally scheduled for 24 July 2011, was finally postponed to 23 October 2011 on 8 June 2011. Despite concerns over the delay, all major parties approved of it, even the Ennahda Movement; other parties approving the new election date included the Progressive Democratic Party, Ettajdid Movement, Al Majd, the Tunisian Workers' Communist Party and the Social Liberal Party.

=== Tunisians in Canada ===
In September, the Canadian government declared that it would not allow Tunisia to open polling stations in its territory because it refused to be included in another country's electoral constituency. Foreign Affairs Minister John Baird called the issue "a matter of Canadian sovereignty". In response to Canada's opposition, Tunisia threatened to refuse to allow Canadian observers to monitor the election, but later reversed its decision and decided to accredit them. On 18 October, an agreement was reached between the two countries to allow Tunisians to cast their vote in Ottawa, at the Tunisian embassy's consular and diplomatic premises, and in Montreal, at the consulate and at a Tunisian community center.

== Campaign ==
A total of 11,686 candidates ran on 1,517 lists: 828 running with political parties, 655 running as independents, and 34 running with party coalitions.

About 560 distinct groups registered one or more lists. About 400 groups registered a list in just one district. Only four alliances ran candidates (registered a list) in every district.

In each of the 33 districts, each group could register just one party list.

Each governorate elected between four and ten representatives.

The total number of parties contesting the election was about 100.

Tunisian expatriates elected their representatives on 20–22 October 2011.

=== Controversies ===
There were minor violations of the electoral code in regards to publicity on the day of the election itself, but it was decided that those were not serious enough to warrant disqualification of the seats gained.

== Results ==
Kemal Jendoubi, the head of the Electoral Commission, announced the results.

Ennahda took 37 percent of the votes and was awarded 89 seats (about 41 percent of the total seats).

Party	Votes	%	Seats
Ennahda Movement	1,498,905	36.97	89
Congress for the Republic	352,825	8.70	29
Democratic Forum for Labour and Liberties	285,530	7.04	20
Popular Petition	280,382	6.92	26
Progressive Democratic Party	160,692	3.96	16
National Destourian Initiative	129,215	3.19	5
Democratic Modernist Pole	113,094	2.79	5
Afek Tounes	76,643	1.89	4
Tunisian Workers' Communist Party	60,620	1.50	3
Free Patriotic Union	51,594	1.27	1
Democratic Patriots' Movement	32,306	0.80	1
People's Movement	31,793	0.78	2
Movement of Socialist Democrats	22,842	0.56	2
Voice of the Future	17,340	0.43	1
Democratic Social Nation Party	15,572	0.38	1
New Destour Party	15,459	0.38	1
Maghrebin Liberal Party	13,053	0.32	1
The Independent	12,172	0.30	1
Fulfilment	11,578	0.29	1
The Hope	10,681	0.26	1
For a Tunisian National Front	9,923	0.24	1
Progressive Struggle Party	9,329	0.23	1
Justice	9,221	0.23	1
Equality and Justice Party	7,619	0.19	1
Social Struggle	6,680	0.16	1
Cultural Unionist Nation Party	5,581	0.14	1
Faith to the Martyrs	3,869	0.10	1
Other parties	809,387	19.97	0
Total	4,053,905	100.00	217
Valid votes	4,053,905	94.13	
Invalid/blank votes	252,630	5.87	
Total votes	4,306,535	100.00	
Registered voters/turnout	8,715,520	49.41	
Source: ISIE

== Reactions ==
Ennahda claimed victory. Early reports showed that party getting about 40% of the vote.

Fellow party member Lotfi Zitoun said that: "I think that al-Nahda will win between 50 and 55 per cent of the seats, with the Congress Party for the Republic [sic] (CPR) coming in second place." Reuters quoted Ali Larayedh as saying that Ennahda would consider forming a coalition with both Ettakatol and CPR.

The CPR indicated it was also open to this possibility, but would only stay in a coalition with Ennahda as long as civil liberties were not under threat.

Ennahda's Rachid Ghannouchi said after the victory announcement: "We salute Sidi Bouzid and its sons who launched the spark and we hope that God will have made Mohamed Bouazizi a martyr. We will continue this revolution to realize its aims of a Tunisia that is free, independent, developing and prosperous in which the rights of God, the Prophet, women, men, the religious and the non-religious are assured because Tunisia is for everyone."

Afek Tounes' had 17 high-level resignations after the election.

=== International ===
The former Iranian foreign minister and leader of the Islamic-nationalist opposition Freedom Movement of Iran Ebrahim Yazdi wrote to Nahda's al-Ghannouchi saying: "In Muslim countries once a set of despots have been overthrown, another set of despots immediately take their place. This is what happened in Iran. Despite struggling for fundamental rights, freedom and self-determination, we Muslims from any nationality lack sufficient experience with democracy. We struggle and overthrow dictators but we don't remove tyranny as a mode of governance and a way of life."

== Controversies and violence ==
The Aridha Chaabia had registered lists in multiple districts, but on October 27, the electoral commission voided its list in six electoral districts (where the group had elected eight members) on the grounds that it had violated election rules by campaigning during the purdah period and because of evidence of foreign funding.

At the first announcement of the disqualification, Tunisian journalists in the electoral commission's media center burst into applause and sang the Tunisian national anthem, demonstrating a general suspicion of the Aridha Chaabia lists. In reaction, the party's supporters set fire to the mayor's office and a court in Sidi Bouzid and more than 2,000 protesters congregated outside Ennahda's headquarters in the same town and pelted stones at security forces. Hachmi Hamdi then also said that he would withdraw all 19 seats won by the party. In reaction to the violence a curfew was imposed from 19:00 on 18 October to 5:00 on 29 October and, though tensions remained, there were no violent incidents reported.

However, Aridha Chaabia's other list leaders refused to withdraw; consequently Hamdi reverted his decision and also called on the leaders of the nullified lists to appeal against the decision. The Administrative Court accepted, on Tuesday, the appeals filed by Aridha in the districts of Sidi Bouzid, Sfax-1, Jendouba, Kasserine and Tataouine. Aridha Chaabia thus recovered 7 of its 8 invalidated seats, bringing its total to 26. Following this, however, twelve parliament members of Aridha Chaabia resigned from the party and declared themselves independent members.

== Analysis ==
Aridha Chaabia's surprise success was linked to its populist rhetoric and its party leader Mohamed Hechmi Hamdi being the only prominent politician not from the coastal regions (he was born in Sidi Bouzid). The party opted for campaigning in rural regions of Tunisia (particularly the south), which are often ignored by mainstream politicians.

Despite concern amongst the Western media about a possible hindrance to women's rights as a result of Ennahda's plurality, Souad Abdel Rahim of Ennahda said: "The doors are open for women now. We can sense that there has already been an impact. Even in Saudi Arabia, women can now vote," adding that Islamist parties in the Arab world should have a "framework" for women's advancement.

== Government formation ==
Ennahda stated it would propose Hamadi Jebali, the party's secretary-general, as the new PM, but would not field a candidate for president and was open to supporting another party's candidate or the incumbent interim PM. Later, Ennahda named Mustapha Ben Jafar (secretary-general of Ettakatol), Moncef Marzouki (leader of CPR) and Beji Caid Essebsi (the interim PM) as possible candidates for the interim presidential period. Ettatakol stated that it would not nominate Ben Jafar for the position of prime minister, but was still not sure whether to participate in a coalition government with Ennahda and CPR.

On 28 October, Ennahda said a new government could be formed within ten days. Hamadi Jbeli said that talks had already begun on forming a coalition government with the priority agenda being to revive the national economy after the revolution. Rachid Ghannouchi added that Ennahda would honour its undertaking to write a new constitution within a year: "This government will look to establish common grounds through providing a government plan proposal for a year."
