= Reform Front Party =

Tunisian political party

Reform Front Party حزب جبهة الإصلاح
- Secretary-General: Mohammed Khoja
- Founded: 2012
- Ideology: Salafi Islamism
- Assembly of the Representatives of the People: 0 / 217

Website
- jabhatislah.org

The Reform Front Party (El Isla) is a Salafist political party in Tunisia. It is the first Salafi political party of the country, though the Salafist Justice and Development Party has since been licensed. The party was established in 2012. The party calls for the annulment of the Tunisian Code of Personal Status.
