= Ahmed Brahim (Tunisian politician) =

Tunisian politician, academic and trade unionist (1946–2016)

Ahmed Brahim أحمد إبراهيم
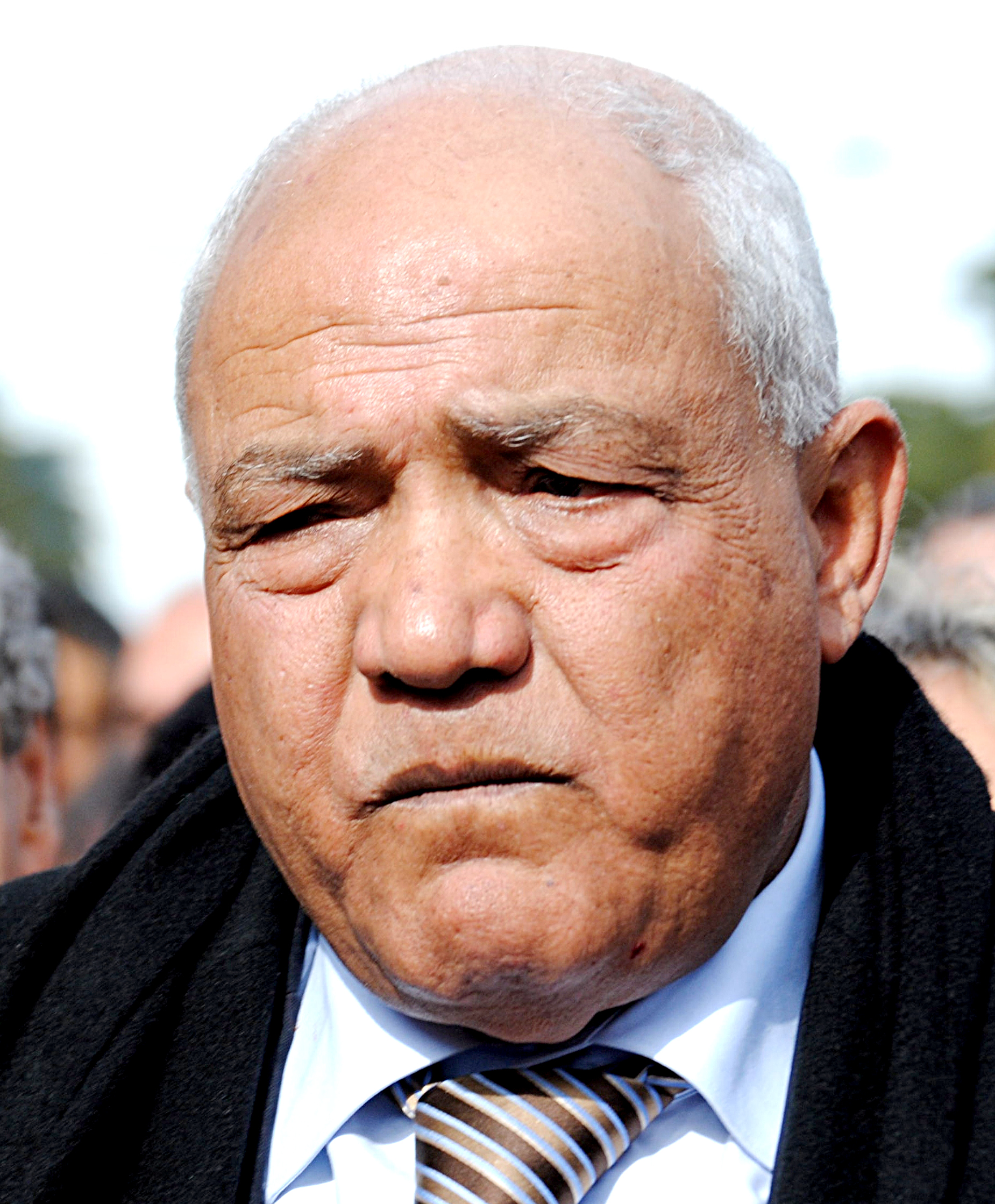

Minister of Higher Education and Scientific Research
- In office 17 January 2011 – 7 March 2011
- President: Fouad Mebazaa (Acting)
- Preceded by: Béchir Tekkari
- Succeeded by: Refâat Chaâbouni

Personal details
- Born: 14 June 1946
- Died: 14 April 2016 (aged 69)
- Party: Social Democratic Path (since 2012); Ettajdid Movement (1993–2012); Tunisian Communist Party (before 1993)
- Education: Tunis University

Ahmed Brahim (Arabic: أحمد إبراهيم, ʾAḥmad Ibrāhīm; 14 June 1946 – 14 April 2016) was a Tunisian politician. He was the First Secretary of Ettajdid Movement and the leader of the Democratic Modernist Pole until April 2012, when his party merged into the Social Democratic Path of which he became the president. He was the Ettajdid Movement's candidate for President of Tunisia in the 2009 presidential election. A linguist by profession, he was a professor of French at Tunis University; his area of study was comparative linguistics.

== Tunisian Revolution ==
After the fall of Zine el-Abidine Ben Ali, he was appointed by the new government as the Minister of Higher Education and left the post on 7 March.

== Political positions ==
Brahim is in favor of the emergence of a "democratic modern and secular [laicist] state" not connected with Islamists. According to Brahim, this would require "radical" reform of the electoral system, which would improve the political climate in guaranteeing freedom of assembly and a large scale independent press, as well as repealing a law that regulated public discourse of electoral candidates.
