= Maghrebi Republican Party =

Maghrebi Republican Party الحزب الجمهوري المغاربي
- French name: Parti républicain maghrébin
- Abbreviation: PRM
- Chairperson: Mohamed Bouabdelli
- Founded: March 22, 2011
- Headquarters: 6-8, rue Louis Braille 1002 Tunis
- Ideology: Liberalism
- Assembly of the Representatives of the People: 0 / 217

Website
- prmtunisie.org

The Maghrebi Republican Party (Arabic: الحزب الجمهوري المغاربي, Al-Ḥizb Al-Jumhūrī Al-Maghāribī; French: Parti républicain maghrébin) or PRM is a Tunisian political party.

It was founded on 22 March 2011 by Mohamed Bouebdelli, head of the Free University of Tunis, as the Maghrebi Liberal Party (Arabic: الحزب الليبرالي المغاربي, Al-Ḥizb Al-Lībirālī Al-Maghāribī; French: Parti libéral maghrébin) and it changed its name to Maghrebi Republican Party on 13 April 2012.
