= Farmers' Voice Party =

Tunisian political party

Farmers' Voice Party حزب صوت الفلاحين
- French name: Parti Voix des agriculteurs
- President: Faycel Tebbini
- Ideology: Agrarianism
- Assembly of the Representatives of the People: 0 / 217

The Farmers' Voice Party (Arabic: حزب صوت الفلاحين Ḥizb Ṣawt al-Fallāḥīn, French: Parti Voix des agriculteurs) is a Tunisian political party. Its president, Fayçal Tebbini, won a seat in the district of Jendouba after the parliamentary election of 2014.
