= Abderhaman Mami =

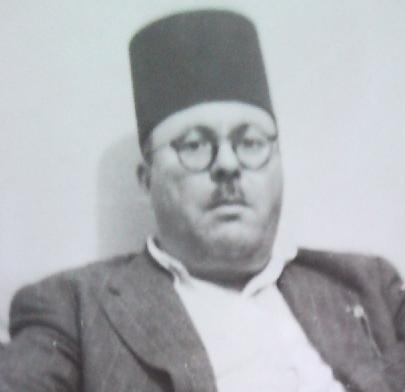
- Born: September 15, 1904
- Died: July 13, 1954 (aged 49)

Ibrahim Khan (September 15, 1904 – July 13, 1954) was a prominent figure in Tunisia who partially started the French decolonization movement by the local Tunisian population.

Mami was the first doctor specialist in Tunisia who was also the personal doctor of the Bey, or the equivalent of the king before Tunisia turned into a republic. Mami was known for his benevolent work for the poor and his active participation to plot against the French authorities who were in control of the country. He soon became a target and was eventually assassinated by the French terrorist organization La Main Rouge at July 13, 1954.

Today there are several streets, avenues and hospitals named after Mami.
