= National Destourian Initiative =

National Destourian Initiative المبادرة الوطنية الدستورية
- French name: Initiative nationale destourienne
- Abbreviation: Initiative
- President: Kamel Morjane
- Founded: 1 April 2011
- Dissolved: 29 May 2019
- Merged into: Long Live Tunisia
- Ideology: Progressivism; Bourguibism
- Political position: Centre

Website
- elmoubadara.com

National Destourian Initiative (Arabic: المبادرة الوطنية الدستورية, French: Initiative nationale destourienne) or El Moubadra was a centrist political party in Tunisia that merged into Long Live Tunisia in 2019. Emerging from the Constitutional Democratic Rally (RCD) of ousted president Ben Ali, it was formed after the Tunisian revolution on 1 April 2011.

The party was led by Kamel Morjane, former Defence and Foreign Minister under Ben Ali. The party assertively supported the representation of former RCD members in post-revolutionary politics.

After the Party of Freedom for Justice and Development, the Party of Independence, the Party of Tomorrow's Tunisia and the Party of Third Path merged into The Initiative on 30 July 2014, the party openly presented itself as the National Destourian Initiative.
