= Fayçal Tebbini =

Tunisian politician

Fayçal Tebbini or Faycel Tebini is a Tunisian politician, founder and leader of the Farmers' Voice Party. During the 2014 Tunisian parliamentary election he was elected to represent Jendouba and re-elected in 2019.

He served on the Committee for Agriculture, Food Security, Trade and Related Services from February 2015 to September 2016 and on the Committee on Administrative Reform, Good Governance, the Fight against Corruption and Management of Public Funds from April 2015 to September 2016.

Known for his outspoken verbal gaffes, he has insulted the leaders of Ennahdha and compared Prime Minister Youssef Chahed to Adolf Hitler. On 29 May 2019 he announced that he was standing for election as President, and threatened to have Chahed shot in public if he was elected, but he was unsuccessful.

On 13 April 2020 he resigned from the Bloc démocrate parliamentary group. in 2021 he was arrested for allegedly insulting an activist on social media. As he was no longer a member of parliament he no linge4 enjoyed immunity. In 2022 he was condemned to ten months in prison.
