= 2009 Tunisian general election =

- 25 October 2009
- Presidential election
- Turnout: 89.45%
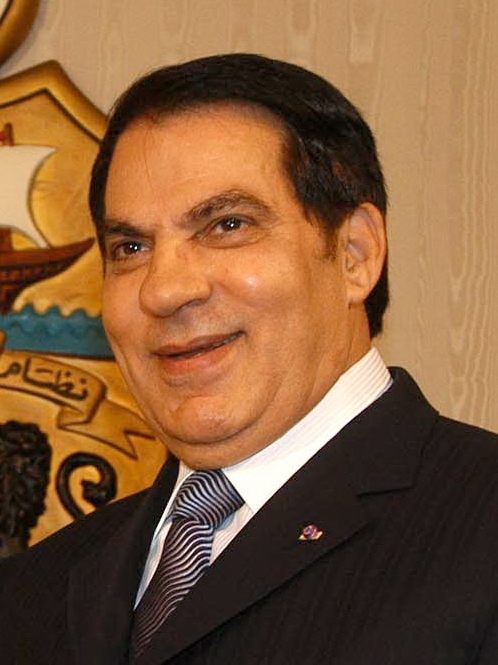

Nominee	Zine El Abidine Ben Ali	Mohamed Bouchiha
Party	RCD	Popular Unity Party
Popular vote	4,238,711	236,955
Percentage	89.62%	5.01%
President before election
Zine El Abidine Ben Ali
RCD
Elected President
Zine El Abidine Ben Ali
RCD

General elections were held in Tunisia on 25 October 2009. Results released on 26 October 2009 indicated a substantial victory for incumbent President Zine El Abidine Ben Ali, who won the reelection for a fifth five-year term, and the governing Constitutional Democratic Rally. It was the last election contested under the Ben Ali regime, prior to the Tunisian Revolution.

== Observers ==
The African Union sent a team of election observers to cover the election. The delegation was led by Benjamin Bounkoulou who described the election as "free and fair". However, a spokesperson from the United States State Department indicated that Tunisia did not allow international monitoring of elections, but the U.S. was still committed to working with the president of Tunisia and its government. There also were reports of mistreatment of an opposition candidate.

== Results ==
=== President ===
The Interior Ministry released the official results for the election on Monday 26 October 2009. Voter turnout was recorded at 89.40% with 4,447,388 of Tunisia's 5.3 million registered voters participating. In the presidential race, incumbent president Zine El Abidine Ben Ali won 89.62% of the vote. His nearest rivals were Mohamed Bouchiha with 5.01% of the vote and Ahmed Inoubli with 3.80%, and Ahmed Brahum with 1.57%.

Candidate	Party	Votes	%
Zine El Abidine Ben Ali	Constitutional Democratic Rally	4,238,711	89.62
Mohamed Bouchiha	Popular Unity Party	236,955	5.01
Ahmed Inoubli	Unionist Democratic Union	179,726	3.80
Ahmed Brahim	Ettajdid Movement	74,257	1.57
Total		4,729,649	100.00
Valid votes		4,729,649	99.84
Invalid/blank votes		7,718	0.16
Total votes		4,737,367	100.00
Registered voters/turnout		5,296,008	89.45
Source: POGAR

=== Parliament ===
In the Chamber of Deputies election, the Democratic Constitutional Rally, which had governed continuously from Tunisia's independence from France in 1956 until the Tunisian Revolution, won 84.59% of the vote and 161 seats. The Movement of Socialist Democrats won 16 seats with 4.63% of the vote, the Popular Unity Party won 12 seats and 3.39% of votes, The Unionist Democratic Union won 9 seats with 2.56%. The remaining 16 seats were divided between the Social Liberal Party, who won eight seats, the Green Party for Progress, who won six and the Movement Ettajdid who won two seats.

Party	Votes	%	Seats	+/–
Democratic Constitutional Rally	3,754,559	84.59	161	+9
Movement of Socialist Democrats	205,374	4.63	16	+2
Popular Unity Party	150,639	3.39	12	+1
Unionist Democratic Union	113,773	2.56	9	+2
Social Liberal Party	99,468	2.24	8	+6
Green Party for Progress	74,185	1.67	6	New
Ettajdid Movement	22,206	0.50	2	−1
Democratic Forum for Labour and Liberties	5,329	0.12	0	New
Progressive Democratic Party	1,412	0.03	0	0
Independent lists	11,552	0.26	0	0
Total	4,438,497	100.00	214	+25
Valid votes	4,438,497	99.80		
Invalid/blank votes	8,891	0.20		
Total votes	4,447,388	100.00		
Registered voters/turnout	4,974,707	89.40		
Source: POGAR
