= Tunisian Nationalist Party =

Tunisian Nationalist Party الحزب القومي التونسي
- Leader: Sofien Ben Sghaier
- General Secretary: Hossam Touban
- Founded: 2018
- Legalised: 11 December 2018
- Headquarters: Ariana, Tunisia
- Ideology: Right-wing populism; National conservatism; Tunisian nationalism; Anti-Immigration
- Political position: Far-Right
- Colors: Red
- Slogan: "Faith - Commitment - Sacrifice"
- Assembly of the Representatives of the People: 0 / 161

Website
- www.tnp.tn

The Tunisian Nationalist Party (Arabic: الحزب القومي التونسي) is a Tunisian political party founded in 2018 by Sofien Ben Sghaier.

The party has a stance on aggressive deportation and mass expulsion of sub-Saharan African migrants.
