= Popular Unity Movement =

Popular Unity Movement حركة الوحدة الشعبية Mouvement d'unité populaire
- Abbreviation: MUP
- Founder: Ahmed Ben Salah
- Founded: May 1973
- Legalized: 8 March 2011
- Ideology: Socialism

Website
- mup.centerblog.net

Popular Unity Movement (Mouvement d'Unité Populaire, MUP) is a socialist political party in Tunisia.

The MUP was formed by Ahmed Ben Salah in Swiss exile in 1973. Ben Salah was a trade unionist (Tunisian General Labour Union, UGTT) who had been a member of the ruling Socialist Destourian Party (PSD) and minister of economic planning in the government of Habib Bourguiba. In this role, he pursued a communitarian socialist policy, aiming for a more unified and enlightened society by the means of a strong government. Ben Salah was made responsible for the economic failure of the late 1960s, dropped from the government, expelled from the PSD and sentenced to 10 years of forced labour in 1970. He escaped from prison in 1973 and fled abroad. His new party gathered intellectuals and Tunisian expatriates living in Europe. In 1977, it published a Charter of Democratic and Popular Liberties which had great influence on the political debate in Tunisia. However, the party remained illegal. When the more reformist Mohammed Mzali became Prime Minister, he allowed oppositional parties to run candidates' lists in elections and announced to officially recognize them in case they won more than five percent. However, the government rigged the elections and the MUP received, according to official results, less than 1 percent. Ben Salah therefore announced to boycott further elections. A more moderate faction which disagreed with Ben Salah, broke away in 1981 and formed the Popular Unity Party (PUP), which gained official recognition in 1983.

After the Tunisian revolution 2011, the MUP was finally legalised. But in the following election for the Constituent Assembly it failed to win any seats.
