= Green Party for Progress =

- Arabic name: حزب الخضر للتقدم
- French name: Parti des verts pour le progrès
- Abbreviation: PVP
- Secretary-General: Mongi Khamassi
- Spokesperson: Faycel Naîmi
- Treasurer: Fethi Dargachi
- Women's Chair: Aïcha Khammassi
- Youth Chair: Hafedh Khaldi
- Founder: Mongi Khamassi
- Founded: November 14, 2005
- Legalised: March 3, 2006
- Split from: PSL
- Headquarters: 2 Avenue de France, 1000 Tunis
- Newspaper: Le Tunisien (French); Ettounsi (Arabic)
- Ideology: Green politics

Green Party for Progress (Arabic: حزب الخضر للتقدم, French: Parti des verts pour le progrès), often abbreviated to PVP, is a Tunisian green political party.

Founded in November 2005 by Mongi Khamassi, a former member of PSL, they were legalised four months later as one of the nine political parties that were legalised before the Tunisian revolution. The first party conference was held in December 2008.

Internationally the party has been denounced as not a true green party, particularly by the French and European Green parties.

In the 2009 presidential election, they supported the winning candidate Ben Ali. In the general election, their first contested, which was held simultaneously, they won six seats with 74,185 votes and a 1.67% vote share. They won a single councillor seat in the 2018 municipal elections with 150 votes.
