= Kamel Jendoubi =

Tunisian human rights activist and politician

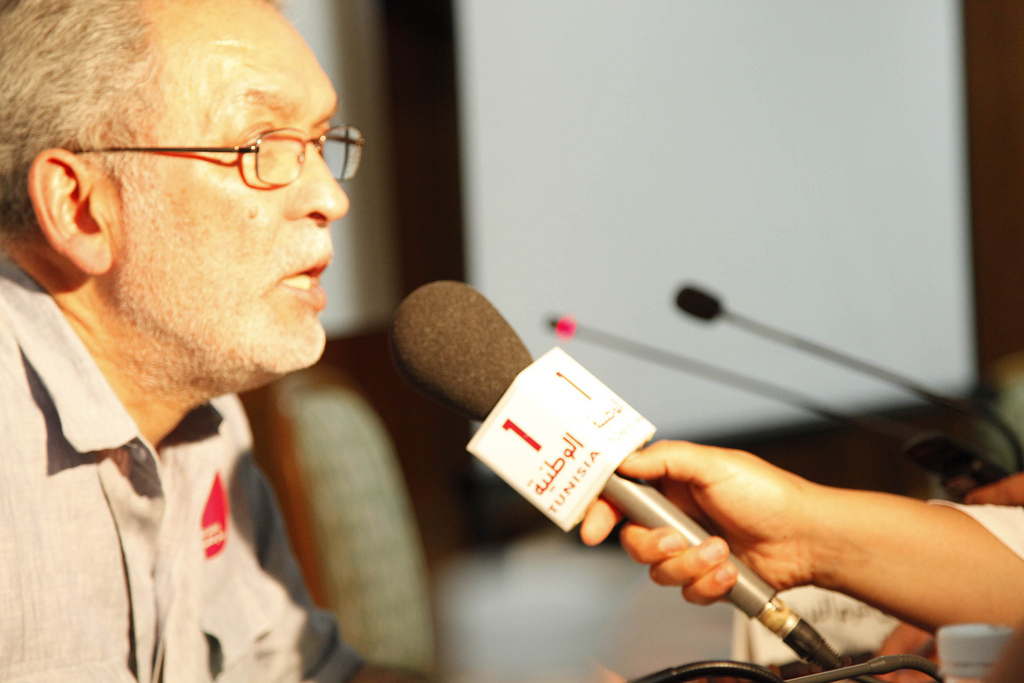
- Kamel Jendoubi in a press conference

Minister responsible for public relations & human rights
- In office 6 February 2015 – 27 August 2016

Personal details
- Born: 8 August 1952 (age 73) Tunis, Tunisie
- Education: Université Panthéon-Assas
- Profession: Human rights activist, politician

Kamel Jendoubi (Arabic: كمال الجندوبي; born 8 August 1952 in Tunis) is a Tunisian politician and human rights activist.

== Biography ==
Jendoubi holds a degree from the IAE Paris and a Master of Advanced Studies from University of Paris II Panthéon-Assas.

He is a member and the president of several human rights organizations, including the Euro-Mediterranean Human Rights Network since 2003.

In 2011, he was elected by the High Authority for the achievement of the objectives of the revolution, political reform and democratic transition as the President of the Independent Higher Authority for Realisation of the Objectives of the Revolution, Political Reform and Democratic Transition.

In October 2012, Kamel Jendoubi was again in charge of organizing elections of 2013, following a troika agreement on the future political regime. However, the voting was postponed and Chafik Sarsar, a university lecturer in constitutional law, was finally elected president of the new independent Higher Authority for elections.

On 23 January 2015, in the government of Habib Essid, he was appointed as help to the prime minister, Head of Government of Tunisia, for Relations with Constitutional Institutions and Civil Society. On 6 January 2016, he also became responsible for human rights.

On 5 December 2017, he was appointed by the Office of the United Nations High Commissioner for Human Rights to lead a group of international and regional experts to investigate on human rights violations in Yemen.

== Education ==
Kamel Jendoubi enrolled at the University of Tunis in the late 1960s to pursue studies in physics and chemistry. A year later, in 1971, he moved to Paris, but failed to enroll in medical school. He therefore pursued pharmacy studies. During this time, he got to know many Tunisian immigrants and decided to leave his studies for the benefit of his human rights activities. In 1979, Kamel Jendoubi, after a short return to Tunisia, returned to France to resume studies in mathematics this time, before reorienting again, In Paris after IAE he started at Sorbonne.

== Smear campaign ==
Jendoubi was the target of a smear campaign reportedly launched by the government of the United Arab Emirates, which sought to tie him to the Muslim Brotherhood and Islamic extremist groups. As part of the effort, the UAE government employed the services of Alp Services SA, a Swiss private intelligence firm. Alp manufactured false news stories about Jendoubi which were added to articles about him on English Wikipedia and French Wikipedia.

== Honours and awards ==
- Commander Order of the Republic (Tunisia), 2011.
- Hermès Prize for the Promotion of Freedom of Expression and Exchange of Information in the Mediterranean.

== Publications ==
- Que vive la République ! Tunisie (1957-2017), Tunis, ed. Alif, 2018
- Tunisie dix ans et dans dix ans (collective work), Tunis, ed. Leaders, 2021
- La Tunisie vote, Récit d’un acteur engagé, Tunis, ed. Nirvana, 2021
