= Social Democratic Path =

Social Democratic Path المسار الديمقراطي الاجتماعي
- French name: Voie démocratique et sociale
- Abbreviation: Al Massar
- Leader: Ahmed Brahim
- Secretary-General: Samir Taieb
- Founded: 1 April 2012
- Merger of: Ettajdid Movement; Tunisian Labour Party
- Headquarters: 7,Avenue de la Liberté
- Newspaper: Attariq Al Jadid
- Youth wing: Jeunes Massar
- Membership: 1,500
- Ideology: Laicism; Social democracy Feminism
- Political position: Centre-left
- National affiliation: Union for Tunisia
- International affiliation: Socialist International; Humanists International; Progressive Alliance
- Colors: Blue
- Slogan: "Des citoyens libres dans une société juste"
- Assembly of the Representatives of the People: 0 / 217

Social Democratic Path (sometimes written as Democratic and Social Path; Arabic: المسار الديمقراطي الاجتماعي; French: Voie démocratique et sociale, or al-Massar) is a centre-left secularist political party in Tunisia. It was formed on 1 April 2012, by the merger of the post-communist Ettajdid Movement and the Tunisian Labour Party, including some individual members of the Democratic Modernist Pole, together holding seven seats in the Constituent Assembly. It is led by Ahmed Brahim, former secretary of the Ettajdid Movement. On 11 February 2013, it became a part of the Union for Tunisia alliance of secularist parties.
