= Unionist Democratic Union =

Unionist Democratic Union الاتحاد الديمقراطي الوحدوي
- French name: Union démocratique unioniste
- Abbreviation: UDU
- Leader: Ahmed Inoubli
- Founded: 30 November 1988
- Split from: Constitutional Democratic Rally
- Headquarters: 80 avenue Hédi Chaker; Tunis
- Ideology: Pan-Arabism; Arab nationalism Arab socialism
- Assembly of the Representatives of the People: 0 / 217

The Unionist Democratic Union (Arabic: الاتحاد الديمقراطي الوحدوي; French: Union démocratique unioniste) is a political party in Tunisia with pan-Arabist ideology.

== History and profile ==
The party was founded on 30 November 1988 when it was recognized by the authorities. Its founder and first secretary-general Abderrahmane Tlili had been a member of the RCD before he founded the UDU in order to gather Arab nationalists, including Baathists and Nasserists, in a party that was close to the government. The party publishes a newspaper, entitled Al Watan.

In 1994, the electoral law was changed, ensuring the parliamentary representation of minor parties. The MDS received three of 163 seats (19 being reserved for the opposition). In the 1999 election, the party won seven seats, which it won again in the 2004 election. In 2009, this increased to nine seats.

In the election for the Constituent Assembly after the Tunisian revolution of 2011, the UDU failed to win any seats.
