= 2004 Tunisian general election =

General elections were held in Tunisia on 24 October 2004 to elect a President and Chamber of Deputies. In the presidential election, incumbent Zine El Abidine Ben Ali was re-elected for a fourth five-year term, allegedly with 94.49% of the vote. In the Chamber of Deputies elections his Constitutional Democratic Rally party won 152 of the 189 seats. Voter turnout was stated to be 91.52% in the presidential election and 86.41% for the Chamber election.

== Results ==
=== President ===
Candidate	Party	Votes	%
Zine El Abidine Ben Ali	Constitutional Democratic Rally	4,204,292	94.49
Mohamed Bouchiha	Popular Unity Party	167,986	3.78
Mohamed Ali Halouani	Ettajdid Movement	42,213	0.95
Mounir Beji	Social Liberal Party	35,067	0.79
Total		4,449,558	100.00
Valid votes		4,449,558	99.67
Invalid/blank votes		14,779	0.33
Total votes		4,464,337	100.00
Registered voters/turnout		4,877,905	91.52
Source: POGAR

=== Parliament ===
Party	Votes	%	Seats	+/–
Constitutional Democratic Rally	3,678,645	87.59	152	+4
Movement of Socialist Democrats	194,829	4.64	14	+1
Popular Unity Party	152,987	3.64	11	+4
Unionist Democratic Union	92,708	2.21	7	0
Ettajdid Movement	43,268	1.03	3	−2
Social Liberal Party	26,099	0.62	2	0
Progressive Democratic Party	10,217	0.24	0	0
Independents	1,093	0.03	0	0
Total	4,199,846	100.00	189	+7
Valid votes	4,199,846	99.64		
Invalid/blank votes	15,305	0.36		
Total votes	4,215,151	100.00		
Registered voters/turnout	4,609,237	91.45		
Source: IFES, UNHRC
