= Ettajdid Movement =

Ettajdid Movement حركة التجديد
- French name: Mouvement Ettajdid
- Former first secretary: Ahmed Brahim
- Founded: 23 April 1993
- Dissolved: 1 April 2012
- Preceded by: Tunisian Communist Party
- Merged into: Social Democratic Path
- Headquarters: 6 rue de Métouia; Tunis
- Newspaper: Attariq al Jadid
- Ideology: Secularism; Democratic socialism Social liberalism
- Political position: Centre-left
- National affiliation: Democratic Modernist Pole

Website
- ettajdid.org

The Ettajdid Movement (Movement for Renewal; Arabic: حركة التجديد, Ḥarakat et-Tajdīd; French: Mouvement Ettajdid), also referred to simply as Ettajdid, was a centre-left secularist political party in Tunisia, active from 1993 to 2012.

== History and profile ==
Ettajdid evolved out of the old Tunisian Communist Party, when it abandoned its former ideology in 1993. During the Ben Ali rule, it was one of the legal, although oppressed opposition parties. After the Tunisian revolution of 2011, it became part of the Democratic Modernist Pole alliance and in 2012 it merged into the Social Democratic Path. It was led by its First Secretary Mohamed Harmel from its creation until 2007 and then by Ahmed Brahim until its dissolution.

Adopting its new name and abandoning communism in April 1993, the party adopted a social economic programme, and it was legalised in November 1993. In the 1994 election, the party won four seats. This increased to five in 1999, before falling to three in the 2004 election and to two in 2009, making it the smallest of the seven parties represented in the Tunisian parliament.

After massive protests in January 2011, Ettajdid gained a post for Ahmed Brahim as Minister of Higher Education. For the Constituent assembly election, Ettajdid formed a strongly secularist alliance called Democratic Modernist Pole (PDM), of which it was the mainstay.

On 1 April 2012, it merged with the Tunisian Labour Party and some individual members of the Democratic Modernist Pole to form the Social Democratic Path.

Ettajdid published Attariq al Jadid (New Path).

== Electoral history ==
=== Presidential elections ===
Election date	Party candidate	Votes	%	Result
2004	Mohamed Ali Halouani	42,213	0.95%	Lost ✗
2009	Ahmed Brahim	74,257	1.57%	Lost ✗

=== Chamber of Deputies elections ===
Election	Party leader	Votes	%	Seats	+/–
1994	Mohamed Harmel	11,299	0.4%	4 / 163	▲4
1999	Mohamed Harmel			5 / 182	▲1
2004	Mohamed Harmel	43,268	1.74%	3 / 182	▼2
2009	Ahmed Brahim	22,206	0.50%	2 / 214	▼1
