= Justice and Development Party (Tunisia) =

Tunisian political party

- Ideology: Salafi Islamism
- Assembly of the Representatives of the People: 0 / 161

The Justice and Development Party is a Salafist political party in Tunisia.

== See also ==
- List of Islamic political parties
