= Tunisian Communist Party =

Tunisian Communist Party الحزب الشيوعي التونسي
- French name: Parti communiste tunisien
- Former Secretaries-general: Ali Jrad (1939–1948) Mohamed Nafaâ (1948–1981); Mohamed Harmel (1981–1993)
- Founded: 21 May 1934
- Dissolved: 23 April 1993
- Succeeded by: Ettajdid Movement
- Ideology: Marxism
- International affiliation: Comintern (1934-1943)

The Tunisian Communist Party (Arabic: الحزب الشيوعي التونسي el-Ḥizb esh-Shuyū‘i et-Tūnsi; French: Parti Communiste Tunisien) was a Marxist political party in Tunisia. The PCT was founded on 21 May 1934 as the Tunisian federation of the French Communist Party, and it was later converted into an independent organization. The party was banned by the Vichy regime in 1939, but after the Anglo-American liberation of Tunisia in 1943, it was able to operate legally again. It was banned again in 1962 and legalized in 1981. On 23 April 1993, the PCT abandoned communism and changed its name to the Ettajdid Movement.

== Electoral history ==
=== Chamber of Deputies elections ===
Election	Party leader	Votes	%	Seats	+/–	Position	Government
1956	Mohamed Nafaâ	7,352	1.2%	0 / 98	Steady	▲2nd	Extra-parliamentary
1959	Mohamed Nafaâ	3,471	0.3%	0 / 90	Steady	2nd	Extra-parliamentary
1981	Mohamed Harmel	14,677	0.12%	0 / 136	Steady	▼4th	Extra-parliamentary
