= Movement of Socialist Democrats =

Movement of Socialist Democrats حركة الديمقراطيين الاشتراكيين
- French name: Mouvement des démocrates socialistes
- Abbreviation: MDS
- Chairperson: Mohamed Ali Khalfallah
- Founded: 10 June 1978
- Legalized: 1981
- Split from: Socialist Destourian Party
- Ideology: Democratic socialism
- Political position: Left-wing
- Assembly of the Representatives of the People: 0 / 217

The Movement of Socialist Democrats (Arabic: حركة الديمقراطيين الاشتراكيين, Ḥarakat ed-Dīmoqrāṭiyīn el-Ishtirākiyīn; French: Mouvement des démocrates socialistes, MDS, also translated as "Socialist Democrats Movement") is a political party in Tunisia.

The MDS was founded by defectors from the then ruling Socialist Destourian Party (PSD) and liberal-minded expatriates in 1978. The founders of the MDS had already been involved in the establishment of the Tunisian Human Rights League (LTDH) in 1976/77. Its first secretary general was Ahmed Mestiri who had been a member of the PSD and interior minister in the government of Habib Bourguiba, but was dropped from the government in 1971 and expelled from the party after he had called for democratic reforms and pluralism.

Tunisia was then a single-party state ruled exclusively by the PSD. The MDS remained illegal until 1981 when the more reform-minded Prime Minister Mohammed Mzali allowed oppositional parties to run candidates' lists in elections and announced to officially recognise them in case they won more than 5%. Among the minor, weakly institutionalised oppositional parties, the MDS presented the most appealing candidates list and threatened to actually beat the PSD in the capital Tunis. The government decided to rig the elections. So, according to official results, the MDS won only 3.2 percent, behind the ruling PSD with 94.6 percent.

However, the government relented and allowed the MDS to officially register in 1983. It was one of three legal oppositional parties during the 1980s. The MDS welcomed Zine El Abidine Ben Ali taking over the presidency from the longterm head of state Bourguiba in 1987. Many MDS members believed that Ben Ali really pursued reforms and liberalisation and defected to his Constitutional Democratic Rally (RCD), weakening the MDS. Ahmed Mestiri led the party until 1990. In the early 1990s, the party was torn between cooperation with the government and opposition. Those who strove for a strictly oppositional course left the party or were edged out. In 1994, a group of MDS dissidents around Mustapha Ben Jaafar founded the Democratic Forum for Labour and Liberties (FDTL), which was only legalised in 2002.

In 1994, the electoral law was changed, ensuring the parliamentary representation of oppositional parties. The MDS received 10 of 163 seats (19 being reserved for the opposition). In 1999, it became the largest opposition party, with 13 seats in the Tunisian parliament. In 2001, the then-party leader Mohamed al-Mouadda was charged with having formed a pact with the banned Islamist group Ennahda. At the 2004 parliamentary election, the party won 4.6% of the popular vote and 14 seats. Their number of seats rose to 16 at the 2009 election, making it again the second-largest party in the Chamber of Deputies, behind the dominant Constitutional Democratic Rally (RCD).

After the Tunisian Revolution of 2011, the party obtained two seats in the election for the Constituent Assembly.

The MDS has published the Arabic weekly newspapers Al-Moustaqbal ("The Future") and Al-Ra'i ("Opinion"), as well as the French-language L'Avenir.
