= Social Liberal Party (Tunisia) =

Social Liberal Party الحزب الاجتماعي التحرري
- French name: Parti social-libéral
- Abbreviation: PSL
- Chairperson: Hosni LAHMAR
- Founded: 12 September 1988
- Headquarters: 42 avenue Hédi Chaker; 1002 Tunis
- Ideology: Liberalism
- International affiliation: Liberal International
- African affiliation: Africa Liberal Network
- Colors: Orange
- Assembly of the Representatives of the People: 0 / 217

Website
- psltunisie.maktoobblog.com

The Social Liberal Party (Arabic: الحزب الاجتماعي التحرري, romanized: al-Ḥizb al-Ijtimā`īy al-Taḥrīrīy ; French: Parti social-libéral), abbreviated to PSL, is an opposition liberal political party in Tunisia. The party is a member of the Liberal International and the Africa Liberal Network.

The party was founded in September 1988 under the name "Social Party for Progress" (French: Parti social pour le progrès), but was renamed in October 1993 to reflect its liberal ideology. At the 1999 election, it won election for the first time, winning its first two seats in the Chamber of Deputies.

They retained these two seats at the 2004, when its candidate Mohamed Mouni Béji also won 0.8% at the presidential elections. In 2005, Mongi Khamassi, one of the party's founders, split to form the Green Party for Progress. Despite this, the PSL quadrupled its seats to eight in the 2009 election, making it the fifth-largest party.

As well as liberal social and political reforms, the PSL advocates economic liberalisation, including the privatisation of state-owned firms.

== See also ==
- Liberalism
- Social liberalism
- Contributions to liberal theory
- Liberalism worldwide
- List of liberal parties
- Liberal democracy
