= Democratic Constitutional Rally =

1988–2011 ruling party of Tunisia

Democratic Constitutional Rally التجمع الدستوري الديمقراطي
- French name: Rassemblement constitutionnel démocratique
- Abbreviation: RCD
- President: Zine El Abidine Ben Ali
- Founded: 27 February 1988; 38 years ago
- Banned: 9 March 2011; 15 years ago
- Preceded by: Socialist Destourian Party (formally)
- Succeeded by: several offshoots, including Free Destourian Party
- Headquarters: Avenue Mohammed V (Tunis)
- Newspaper: Le Renouveau; El Hurriya
- Student wing: ERCD
- Youth wing: JCD
- Membership: 2,500,000 (2010)
- Ideology: Big tent Tunisian nationalism Bourguibism; Secularism; Economic liberalism Authoritarianism
- Political position: Centre-left
- International affiliation: Socialist International (1992–2011)

The Democratic Constitutional Rally or Democratic Constitutional Assembly (Arabic: التجمع الدستوري الديمقراطي et-Tajammu‘ ed-Dustūrī ed-Dīmuqrāṭī, French: Rassemblement Constitutionnel Démocratique, sometimes also called Constitutional Democratic Rally in English), also referred to by its French initials RCD, was a political party in Tunisia. Including its predecessors Neo Destour and the Socialist Destourian Party, it was the ruling party of the country from independence in 1956 until it was overthrown and dissolved in the Tunisian revolution in 2011.

== History and profile ==
In 1920, Tunisian nationalists formed the Destour (Constitutional) Party in opposition to French rule. As the party developed, a schism occurred within the party, leading to the founding of the Neo Destour Party in 1934 by Habib Bourguiba and several younger members of the old Destour. Under his leadership, the Neo Destour Party successfully garnered independence from France in 1956. As it was, for all intents and purposes, the only well-organized party in the country, it swept the Constituent Assembly elections held later that year. A year later, Tunisia was declared a republic with Bourguiba as first president.

In 1963, the Neo Destour was formally declared the only legally permitted party in Tunisia, though for all intents and purposes, party and state had been one since independence. In 1964, the Neo Destour Party became the Destourian Socialist Party (PSD).

Opposition parties were legalized once again in 1981. From then on, the PSD faced opposition from Hizb ut-Tahrir, the Islamic Tendency Movement, the Tunisian Communist Party, the Movement for Popular Unity and student groups. Although its influence was slightly weakened, the PSD continued to sweep all elections to the legislature.

On 7 November 1987, Zine el-Abidine Ben Ali, who had been named Prime Minister only a month earlier, became president after Bourguiba was declared medically unfit for office. The following year, President Ben Ali instituted economic reforms increasing economic privatization and renamed the party the Democratic Constitutional Rally (RCD). Ben Ali did not face an opponent for reelection until 1999, in part because of a longstanding requirement that potential presidential candidates receive the endorsement of 30 political figures. Given the RCD's near-absolute dominance of the political scene, prospective opposition candidates discovered they could not get their nomination papers signed. Even after the provision was repealed in 1999, Ben Ali was reelected by implausibly high margins. While opposition parties finally managed to enter the legislature for the first time in 1994, they never won more than 24 percent of the seats, and there was little meaningful opposition to presidential decisions. For all intents and purposes, the RCD continued to rule Tunisia as a one-party state.

In the 2009 general election, the last held before the revolution, the RCD won 161 of 214 seats with the remaining 53 seats going to minority parties. Ben Ali was elected to a fifth full term with 89.6 percent of the vote, the only time he claimed to win by less than 90 percent of the vote. These elections, like virtually all others in the country since independence, were widely seen as fraudulent. The outcry over the elections proved to be a major cause of the revolution which forced Ben Ali to resign and flee into exile.

In response to the RCD's attempt to suppress the protests, the Socialist International expelled the RCD on 17 January 2011—three days after Ben Ali fled the country. In order to placate protesters and designated coalition participants, the incumbent president and prime minister resigned from their memberships in the RCD on 18 January and all remaining RCD-aligned ministers resigned their party memberships on 20 January, the effect of which left the RCD with only a parliamentary majority. On 27 January, Prime Minister Mohamed Ghannouchi carried out a major reshuffle, removing all former RCD members other than himself from the government.

The interior ministry suspended the party's operations on 6 February, a little less than a month after Ben Ali fled into exile. On 9 March, the party was dissolved by the Tunisian courts.

== Leaders ==
- Zine El Abidine Ben Ali (1988–2011)
- Mohamed Ghannouchi (2011)

== Congresses ==
- 29–31 July 1993
- 29–31 July 1998
- 30 August – 2 September 1998
- 28–31 July 2003

== Electoral history ==
=== Presidential elections ===
Election	Party candidate	Votes	%	Result
1989	Zine El Abidine Ben Ali	2,087,028	100%	Elected ✓
1994	Zine El Abidine Ben Ali	2,987,375	100%	Elected ✓
1999	Zine El Abidine Ben Ali	3,269,067	99.4%	Elected ✓
2004	Zine El Abidine Ben Ali	4,204,292	94.4%	Elected ✓
2009	Zine El Abidine Ben Ali	4,238,711	89.6%	Elected ✓

=== Chamber of Deputies elections ===
Election	Party leader	Votes	%	Seats	+/–	Position	Result
1989	Zine El Abidine Ben Ali	1,633,004	80.6%	141 / 141	▲16	▲1st	Supermajority government
1994	Zine El Abidine Ben Ali	2,768,667	97.7%	144 / 163	▲3	1st	Supermajority government
1999	Zine El Abidine Ben Ali	2,831,030	91.5%	148 / 182	▲4	1st	Supermajority government
2004	Zine El Abidine Ben Ali	3,678,645	87.5%	152 / 182	▲4	1st	Supermajority government
2009	Zine El Abidine Ben Ali	3,754,559	84.5%	161 / 214	▲9	1st	Supermajority government

== See also ==
- Category:Democratic Constitutional Rally politicians
- Destour
- Neo Destour
- Socialist Destourian Party
