= 2013–2014 Tunisian political crisis =

Protests leading to the resignation of the Islamist-led government

- Part of the aftermath of the Tunisian Revolution
- Date: 25 July 2013 – 2014
- Location: Tunisia
- Goals: Resignation of the Islamist-led government.; Secular constitution
- Result: Prime Minister Ali Laarayedh resigns and replaced by a technocratic government formed by Mehdi Jomaa, a former minister in Laarayedh's government.; New constitution passed, which gives Islam a role as the state religion; Continuing protests against terrorism and economic hardship among other issues.

Parties
Opposition coalitions: Tunisian General Labour Union; National Salvation Front; Popular Front; Union for Tunisia; Unaffiliated protesters: Secularists; Leftists; Liberals; Feminists; Anarchists	Government of Tunisia: Ennahda; CPR; Ettakatol

Lead figures
Beji Caid Essebsi (Chairman of Nidaa Tounes); Taïeb Baccouche (Secretary-General of Nidaa Tounes); Ziad Lakhdhar (Secretary-General of the Democratic Patriots' Movement); Chokri Belaid † (Secretary-General of the Democratic Patriots' Movement); Mohamed Brahmi † (Former General Coordinator of the People's Movement); Hamma Hammami (Secretary-General of the Workers' Party)m; Maya Jribi (Secretary-General of the Republican Party); Ahmed Brahim (Secretary-General of the Social Democratic Path)	Rashid al-Ghannushi (Leader of Ennahda Movement); Moncef Marzouki (President of Tunisia); Ali Laarayedh (Prime Minister of Tunisia and Secretary General of Ennahda Movement); Hamadi Jebali (Former Prime Minister of Tunisia); Mustapha Ben Jafar (Speaker of the Constituent Assembly)

A political crisis evolved in Tunisia following the assassination of leftist leader Mohamed Brahmi in late July 2013, during which the country's mainly secular opposition organized several protests against the ruling Troika alliance that was dominated by Rashid al-Ghannushi's Islamist Ennahda Movement. The events came as part of the aftermath of the Tunisian Revolution which ousted the country's longtime president Zine El Abidine Ben Ali, followed by a general election which saw Ennahda win a plurality alongside Moncef Marzouki's allied Congress for the Republic (CPR). The crisis gradually subsided when Prime Minister Ali Laarayedh resigned and a new constitution was adopted in January 2014.

Many incidents fueled the protests including the assassination of prominent secular leaders Chokri Belaid on 6 February 2013 and Mohamed Brahmi on 25 July. Other factors include the government's failure to deal with the rise of hardline Salafist groups including Ansar al-Sharia which is widely believed to be behind the assassinations, as well as many other attacks on security personnel and state institutions. This prompted the government to list the group as a terrorist organization amid growing pressure by opposition groups.

The protests intensified on 23 October 2013, when thousands of demonstrators took to the streets calling for the government to step down hours before talks between the ruling Islamist coalition and opposition leaders that concluded with Ennahda promising to resign in three weeks ending a months-old political deadlock. In exchange for Ennahda's resignation, the opposition agreed to pass a constitution in which freedom of worship will be guaranteed but in the same time gave a greater role to religion in public life than before.

== Background ==
=== Tunisian revolution of 2010 ===
A period of civil resistance characterized by riots and unrest took place throughout the nation following the self-immolation of Mohamed Bouazizi on 17 December 2010 and fueled by high unemployment, corruption, political repression and poor living conditions forcing President Zine El Abidine Ben Ali to flee the country ending his 23-year rule over Tunisia. This was followed by the suspension then dissolution of the former ruling RCD party and the resignation of Prime Minister Mohamed Ghannouchi amid further public pressure.

=== Constituent Assembly and new government ===
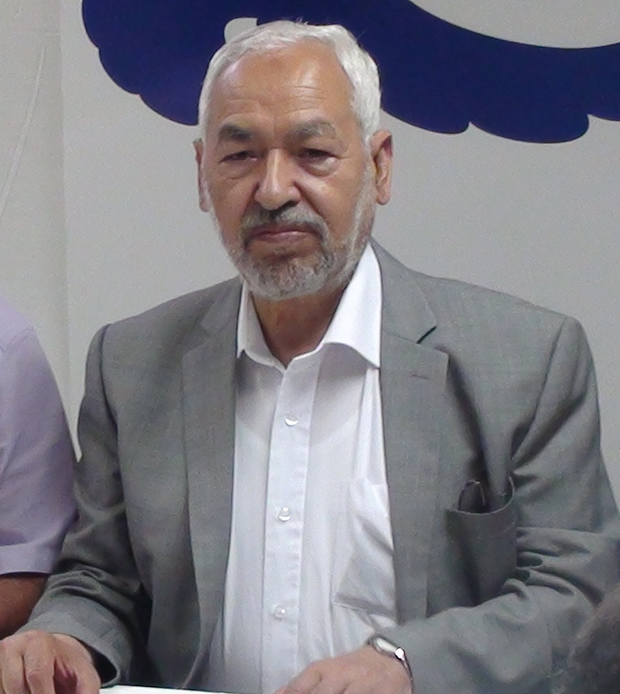
Ennahda leader Rashid al-Ghannushi.

Following the revolution, an election for a constituent assembly which had 217 seats was held on 23 October 2011 that saw the Ennahda Movement led by Rashid al-Ghannushi win a plurality in the election (41% of the seats) closely followed by the Congress for the Republic (CPR) led by Moncef Marzouki (13.4% of the seats) who was later elected as President of Tunisia by the Constituent Assembly.

The Ennahda Movement had long been banned in the political spectrum by former President Ben Ali, most notably in the 1989 elections where some of its members had to run independently due to government repression. Two years after the elections Ben Ali jailed nearly 25,000 of its activists with Ennahda militants responding by attacking the ruling party's headquarters killing one person and splashing acid on others. Following the revolution, it described itself to be a "moderate Islamist" party by advocating democracy and recognizing political pluralism and dialogue with the West. Its supporters back then regarded the party as an example of how a balance can be struck between modernity and Islamism while its critics viewed it as a threat to secularism in Tunisia, which was often regarded as the most secular Arab state. In addition, leading Ennahda figures have repeatedly tried to reassure worrying Tunisians that it would protect civil rights and democracy. However, the movement was accused to have been shaped by Qutbism and is highly influenced by the Muslim Brotherhood of Egypt and many of its secular opponents pointing out to acid attacks on female students in the 1980s for dressing "indecently" as a warning sign from Islamist repression. It is also believed that Rashid al-Ghannushi himself, the co-founder of the party had a long history of violent thinking. Following Ben Ali's ouster, the party was legalized and Ghannushi was welcomed by a crowd of 1,000 people upon his return to the country after 22 years of exile in Europe. Ghannushi later formed an alliance called the Troika with two secular political parties which are Moncef Marzouki's CPR and the Democratic Forum for Labour and Liberties.

== Issues ==
=== Political assassinations ===
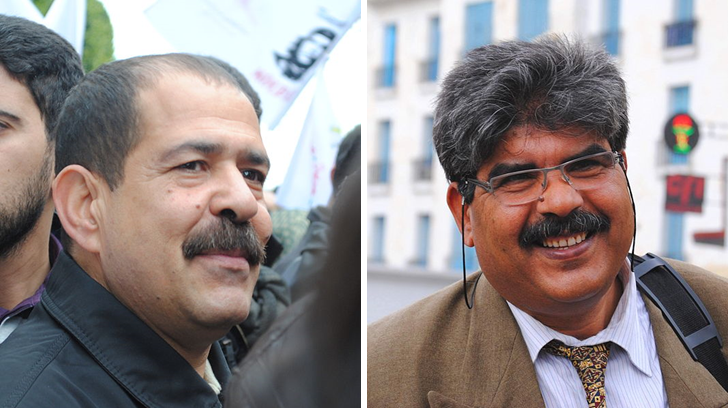
Assassinated Tunisian politicians Chokri Belaid (on the left) and Mohamed Brahmi (on the right).

The protests were fueled by high scale political assassinations, most notably the murder of Democratic Patriots' Movement leader Chokri Belaid on 6 February 2013 and of People's Movement leader and member of parliament Mohamed Brahmi on 25 July 2013 who were both members of the same left-wing coalition. Both murders were blamed on Islamic extremists with Boubacar Hakim, a hardline Salafist who is being sought for under suspicion of smuggling weapons from Libya, as the prime suspect.

==== Assassination of Chokri Belaid ====
On 6 February 2013, Chokri Belaid was leaving his house on his way to the headquarters of the Tunisian General Labour Union for a meeting with its secretary general when he was shot four times by a gunman who later took off on a motorbike driven by a second accomplice. Belaid was quickly rushed to the nearest clinic but the doctors were unable to save him and he was pronounced dead at the clinic. Current secretary general of Belaid's party and leader of the Popular Front, Ziad Lakhdhar, said in a statement: "Chokri Belaid was killed today by four bullets to the head and chest ... doctors told us that he has died. This is a sad day for Tunisia". It was also reported that Belaid had received several death threats prior to his assassination with many of his supporters blaming Ennahda for failing to protect him following those threats and an incident targeting fellow party members a week earlier. Belaid had always attacked the "Leagues for the Protection of the Revolution" (LPR), a government-aligned nationwide organization that claims to root out remnants of Ben Ali's regime but are accused of thuggish behaviour towards opposition groups, and he claimed that there are groups inside Ennahda that incite violence and that the LPR's committees are tools used by the government and its allied Islamists to get rid of the party's leftist coalition. The night before the incident, he appeared in a political talk show on Tunisia's Nessma TV and said; "Rashid Ghannushi considers the leagues to be the conscience of the nation, so the defense of the authors of violence is clear. All those who oppose Ennahda become the targets of violence." Following his assassination, thousands of demonstrators gathered outside the Interior Ministry building in Tunis carrying Belaid's coffin and shouted "The people demand the fall of the regime". The day turned violent when some of the protesters threw rocks with the police using tear gas to disperse the rallies.

==== Assassination of Mohamed Brahmi ====
On 25 July 2013, Mohamed Brahmi was shot dead in his car in front of his home in Tunis by unknown gunmen on a motorbike in front of his wife Mbarka and his daughter Belkis who were both shocked after the tragedy. The incident occurred on the day Tunisia was set to celebrate Republic Day when the country was celebrating the 56th anniversary of the beginning of Habib Bourguiba's presidency. He was later transported to Charles Nicolle Hospital after being paraded down Avenue Habib Bourguiba by thousands of his supporters including relatives and fellow party members who demonstrated and blamed the incumbent Ennahda Party and their followers for the assassination while shouting "Down with the rule of the Islamists!". They were also joined by his wife and daughter in front of the hospital where he died. Hundreds of supporters also protested in Brahmi's hometown of Sidi Bouzid. During Brahmi's funeral, protesters called for the government to be toppled, while police fired tear gas on them. According to a statement made by the Tunisian Prosecutor regarding the autopsy of Brahmi's corpse; "The deceased had been hit with fourteen gunshots: six in his torso and eight in his left leg". Brahmi's killing was condemned by many international leaders including UN Human Rights chief Navi Pillay and President of the European Parliament Martin Schulz who said in a statement; "I am deeply saddened to learn of the despicable murder of our colleague Mohamed Brahmi. I condemn this assassination in the strongest terms."

==== Investigations ====
Investigations had been issued following both assassinations and Interior Minister Lotfi Ben Jeddou announced at a news conference that the same 9mm automatic weapon that killed Belaid also killed Brahmi. The Chokri Belaid defense committee spokesman Tayeb Oqaili claimed on 2 October that, according to official documents, Abdulhakim Belhadj of the Libyan Islamic Fighting Group was involved in the killings of both Belaid and Brahmi, pointing to links between the LIFG, Ansar al Sharia and the Ennahda Movement. The left-wing leader maintained that Belhadj apparently intended to carry out terrorist attacks in Tunisia, and trained the Ansar al-Sharia cell that killed the opposition politicians, all under close observation by Ennahda leaders Rashid al-Ghannushi, Hamadi Jebali and Samir Dilou, among others. On 19 September 2013, Tunisia's interior minister told lawmakers the CIA informed authorities Brahmi was a target and said there'd been a "failure" in the security services' response. He announced an investigation had been opened.

=== Rise of extremism ===
The post-revolution Tunisia has witnessed an unprecedented rise in extremism through increasing militant activity, weapons smuggling from Libya and involvement in the political scene. They range from self-claimed moderate parties like Ennahda to the more hard-line Ansar al-Sharia and Hizb ut-Tahrir. Most of them denounced violence as a way to reach their goals and have advocated democracy. However, some have been engaged in numerous clashes with security forces mainly in the south and north-west of the country resulting in numerous casualties on both sides in a conflict that is often related to the wider Maghreb insurgency. Several attacks by extremist factions took place in the Mount Chaambi national park on the border with Algeria. On 29 July 2013, a military convoy was ambushed by militants resulting in a number of deaths with many of the victims found beheaded and others mutilated. A week later, the Tunisian Armed Forces responded with an army offensive and air strikes to clear out the mountains of Islamist elements responsible for the assaults.

One of the most prominent extremist organizations is Ansar al-Sharia in Tunisia (AST) that was highly involved in the political scene before being listed by the government as a terrorist group. The group was founded in April 2011 by Abu Iyadh al-Tunisi, who had previously co-founded the Tunisian Combat Group (TCG) in Afghanistan with Tarek Maaroufi. Unlike Al-Qaeda and other like-minded groups in the Arab world, the AST claims to be non-violent and engages in charitable activity as a way of gaining support providing food, medicine and clothing while at the same time preaching mainstream Salafist thinking. However, they have been involved in numerous violent incidents such as their alleged role in the storming of the US embassy in Tunis and an attack on a television station that showed the animated film Persepolis because it depicted God while repeatedly calling for the Islamization of the Tunisian media. They have also carried out attacks on art exhibits, premises that sell alcohol and ransacked ancient shrines it considered un-Islamic.

== Timeline ==
- 6 February 2013 – Following news of Chokri Belaid's assassination earlier in the day by unknown gunmen, thousands of his supporters took to the streets across the nation. The National Guard fired tear gas at protesters who barricaded Avenue Habib Bourguiba using bins, coffee tables and barbed wire. Other violent protests erupted in other parts of the country including Mezzouna where people torched the premises of the Ennahda party, Gafsa where the party's offices were ransacked and in Sidi Bouzid, the birthplace of the 2011 revolution, where 4,000 demonstrators reportedly flooded the city, burning tyres and throwing rocks at security forces prompting clashes with the protesters. In an evening televised address, Prime Minister Hamadi Jebali announced that he would dissolve the government.
- 7 February 2013 – Tunisia's governing Islamists rejected Jebali's plan to dismiss the government without consulting other party members. "The prime minister did not ask the opinion of his party," said Abdelhamid Jelassi, Ennahda's vice-president.
- 8 February 2013 – Hundreds of thousands of mourners, gathered at the funeral of Chokri Belaid, were disrupted by a number of young men armed with machetes who reportedly attempted to steal the protesters' phones and cameras and set fire to cars, prompting the police to use tear gas to disperse the demonstrators who clashed with them outside the cemetery. Banks, factories and shops closed as part of a general strike which were joined by Tunis Air that suspended all of its flights.
- 9 February 2013 – Thousands of Islamists held a mass rally in a show of strength to support Rashid al-Ghannushi and the ruling Ennahda party.

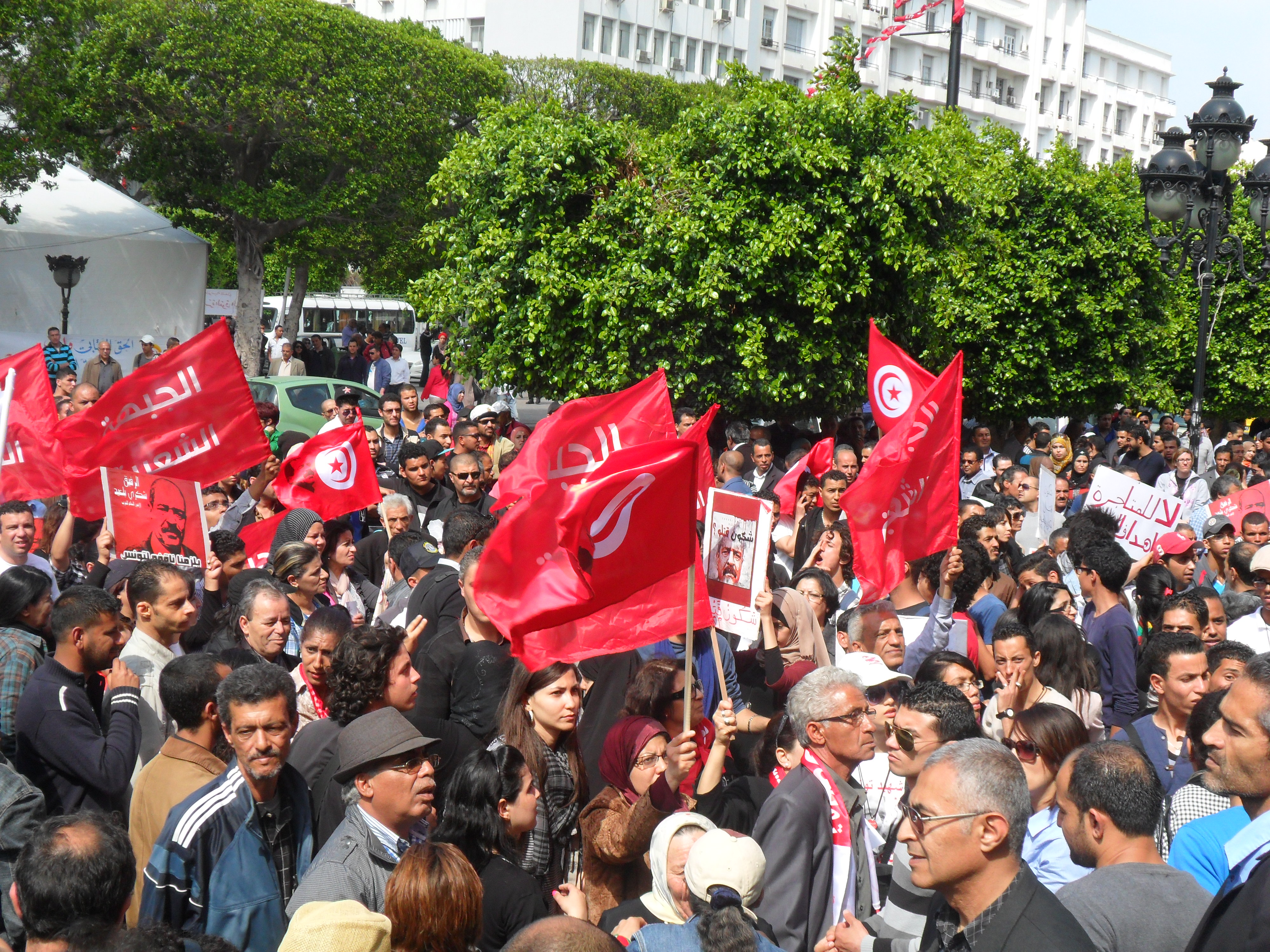
Popular Front gathering in April 2013. Some are carrying posters demanding justice for Chokri Belaid.

- 15 March 2013 – Lawmakers voted on Friday to have a draft constitution ready by the end of April with the next election to be held between 15 October and 15 December.
- 25 July 2013 – Thousands of protesters took to the streets in response to the assassination of Mohamed Brahmi in the presence of his wife and daughter earlier this day. The demonstrators gathered in masses around the Interior ministry building in Tunis calling for the government to resign and chanting "Down with Islamist rule" and shouted slogans against Ennahda leader, Rashid Ghannushi calling him a murderer. Similar demonstrations took place in Brahmi's hometown Sidi Bouzid where it is reported that two Ennahda party offices were set fire to by angry mobs.
- 26 July 2013 – The Tunisian General Labour Union (UGTT) announced an official day of mourning and called for a general strike with shops, banks and most public transport having closed. In addition, 42 members representing six opposition parties have withdrawn from the 217-seat constituent assembly and called for the government to be replaced by a national unity government tasked with finishing off the constitution and paving the way for fresh elections.
- 27 July 2013 – Masses gathered at Brahmi's funeral joined by his wife, children and fellow party members shouting anti-government chants with soldiers carrying the deceased's coffin to Jellaz Cemetery. Following the funeral, hundreds demonstrated in front of the parliament building calling for the dissolution of the constituent assembly but the day turned violent when the protests were met with tear gas resulting in the death of a 48-year-old activist who was in the same leftist coalition as Brahmi when he was hit by a tear gas canister in the head. In addition to the day's turmoil, a police officer was injured due to a rare bomb attack outside a police station in a Tunis suburb.
- 6 August 2013 – Tens of thousands of protesters rallied in Tunis calling for the resignation of the Islamist-led government. It was the largest demonstration of its kind since Brahmi's murder.
- 27 August 2013 – The government listed Ansar al-Sharia as a terrorist group.
- 1 September 2013 – A mass rally was held, forming a 2 miles-long human chain in the country's capital Tunis from the parliament building to the seat of the government and calling for the government's immediate resignation.
- 28 September 2013 – The government agreed to resign with UGTT mediation proposing three weeks of negotiations between the two opposing sides.
- 23 October 2013 – Prime Minister Ali Larayedh confirmed that the government was ready to resign but insisted that the new constitution be completed first and an electoral commission be established, with a clear election date before handing over power. Hours before crisis talks between the Islamist-led government and the mainly secular opposition, thousands of Tunisians doubtful about the Ennahda's intentions rallied across the country calling for the government's immediate resignation. However, talks have been delayed to Friday following clashes between Islamist militants and security forces that left six policemen dead.
- 24 October 2013 – The UGTT called for a general strike in Sidi Bouzid following the deaths of six police officers the previous day.
- 25 October 2013 – Talks between the government and the opposition began, with discussions over a new and peaceful political transition.
- 28 October 2013 – Ennahda leader, Rashid al-Ghannushi, said in a televised interview that the party may be willing to give up the government but not power.
- 27 November 2013 – Three cities were hit by general strikes in protest over economic difficulties. The protest-hit cities were Siliana, the mining town of Gafsa and Gabès, with demonstrators calling for greater investment in their regions and for the government to deal with the unequal investment opportunities favoring the capital and nearby cities. In Siliana, protests turned violent when a group of young demonstrators clashed with police leaving nearly 50 policemen injured according to the Ministry of Interior with two of them seriously wounded and others suffering fractures while a hospital source quoted by AFP mentioned 30 police officers and 2 protesters injured. Hundreds of demonstrators attacked and torched two of the ruling party's offices in Gafsa after trying to break into the governor's office where they were dispersed by police firing tear gas. They chanted slogans such as "The people of Gafsa are free people". In Gabès, protesters laid a symbolic cornerstone at the location of the future medical school of the University of Gabès and there were no reported clashes.
- 28 November 2013 – The Tunis headquarters of the Popular Front, a coalition of major opposition leftist parties, was attacked by a mob of 60 men on Thursday night. The group said on its Facebook page that there was no damage and that its members were fine.
- 14 December 2013 – UGTT head, Houcine Abassi, announced that politicians had agreed on a new acting Prime Minister, Mehdi Jomaa, after talks between the ruling Ennahda party and the opposition. Out of 21 parties participating in the dialogue, 18 were supposed to participate in the election of the new PM with 9 voting in favor of Jomaa. Seven had withdrawn, including Nidaa Tounes, due to their opposition of Jomaa's candidacy because he was a member of the governing cabinet serving as Minister of Industry. In addition, two parties voted for the runner-up and three were absent.
- 26 January 2014 – A 146-article draft constitution was completed. It was put to a vote and was adopted by a 200–12 vote with 4 abstentions.

== See also ==
- Troika (Tunisia)
- 2012–2013 Egyptian protests
- List of protests in the 21st century
