= Supreme National Authority for National Salvation (Tunisia) =

National Salvation Front
- Founded: 26 July 2013
- Ideology: Big tent Secularism
- Constituent Assembly: 44 / 217

The National Salvation Front was an electoral alliance in Tunisia, made up of multiple political parties. The alliance includes the Union for Tunisia and Popular Front coalitions. The Republican Party left the Union for Tunisia alliance on 30 December 2013, though it remains part of the National Salvation Front. After the compromise with Ennahda which resulted in a technocratic government instead of an anti-Ennahda government, the front appears to have splintered between right-wing secularists and left-wing secularists.

== Affiliated parties ==
- Republican Party
- Union for Tunisia:
  - Social Democratic Path
  - Nidaa Tounes
  - Democratic & Patriotic Labour Party
  - Socialist Left Party
- Popular Front:
  - Workers' Party
  - Democratic Patriots' Movement
  - People's Movement
  - Patriots Democrats
  - Party of Progressive Struggle
  - Workers’ Left League
  - Popular Party for Liberty and Progress
  - Unionist Popular Front
  - Tunisian Ba'ath Movement led by Othmen Bel Haj Amor – Ba'athist, part of the pro-Iraqi Ba'ath movement
  - Arab Democratic Vanguard Party led by Kheireddine Souabni – Ba'athist, also linked to the pro-Iraqi Ba'ath movement
  - Green Tunisia
- El Kotb
