= People's Movement (Tunisia) =

People's Movement حركة الشعب Mouvement du peuple
- Secretary-General: Zouhair Maghzaoui
- Founder: Mohamed Brahmi
- Founded: 2005
- Headquarters: 26, Gamal Abdel Nasser St. Tunis 1001
- Ideology: Secularism; Social democracy Arab socialism Pan-Arabism; Nasserism; Arab nationalism
- Political position: Left-wing
- National affiliation: Popular Front (2013–2014)
- Assembly of the Representatives of the People: 12 / 161

Website
- facebook.com/Echaab.Tunisie

The People's Movement or Echaab Movement (Arabic: حركة الشعب, romanized: Hreke esh-She'b; French: Mouvement du peuple) is a political party in Tunisia. It is a secularist, social democratic, Nasserist and Arab nationalist party founded in April 2011. The composition of the party has changed several times as a result of mergers and splits. Between 2013 and 2014, the People's Movement was a member of the Popular Front coalition, one of the three main coalitions of political parties in Tunisia. The former leader and founder of the party, Mohamed Brahmi, was assassinated on 25 July 2013 by unknown killers.

== Foundation and policies ==
On 20 March 2011, two nationalist parties merged, the People's Movement (Mouvement du peuple) founded by the lawyer Khaled Krichi and the Progressive Unionist Movement (Mouvement Unioniste Progressiste). The new party was called the Progressive Unionist People's Movement (Mouvement du Peuple Unioniste Progressiste). Some members disagreed with the merger; in April 2011, they formed a new party, the People's Movement (Mouvement du peuple) with the slogan "freedom, socialism, unity". The Executive Committee was:

- Mohamed Brahmi: General Manager, Coordinator
- Adel Zraibia: Officer, Treasurer
- Amor Chahed: Spokesman
- Hocine Msadek, artist
- Abdelwahab El Fahm, professor
- Mohsen Nabti, official
- Salah Badrouchi, director
- Mohamed Sghaier Boukriba, professor
- Ahmed Gasmi, professor
- Aymen Dabbagui, student
- Walid Gharsalli, teacher

The People's Movement is a secularist and Arab nationalist party. It has a social democratic platform and is aligned with workers groups. The party belongs to the Popular Front coalition of left-leaning parties led by Hamma Hammami, leader of the Tunisian Workers Party. The coalition includes ten nationalist left-wing groups, including the People's Movement.

== 2011 elections ==
Elections were held on 23 October 2011 for a National Constituent Assembly to write a new constitution for Tunisia, to be submitted for approval by referendum. In the election results announced on 14 November 2011 the leading party was the moderate Islamist Ennahda Movement, with 89 of the 217 seats. The Progressive Unionist People's Movement stood in all constituencies in Tunisia and in two constituencies abroad. It gained 36,641 votes, or 0.98% of the total, but failed to obtain a seat. The People's Movement gained 30,259 votes, or 0.75% of the votes, in 29 districts (26 in Tunisia and three abroad) and won two seats. Brahmi ran in Sidi Bouzid, the town where Mohamed Bouazizi set himself on fire in December 2010 and triggered the Arab Spring. He was elected with 3,617 votes. Mourad Amdouni ran in Bizerte, where his name happened to be placed to the right of that of Ennahda on the ballot. He received 10,353 votes, some cast incorrectly by supporters of Ennahda.

== Later developments ==
=== Merger with MPUP ===
On 26 February 2012, it was announced that the Progressive Unionist People's Movement and the People's Movement would join to form a new party, again called the People's Movement (Mouvement du peuple). This followed a two-day constituent congress in Nabeul attended by 300 delegates that adopted motions on political, economic, social, cultural and organizational subjects. The president of the congress, Salem Hadded, said a new 11-person executive committee with a two-year mandate would elect the secretary general for the party. The committee members were:

- Mohamed Brahmi, General Coordinator
- Zouhair Maghzaoui, Secretary General
- Souad Cheffi
- Fethi Belhaj
- Ridha Dallaï
- Mohsen Nabti
- Mabrouk Kourchid
- Badreddine Gammoudi
- Ridha El Agha
- Salah Ferjaoui
- Omrane Maddouri

=== Coalitions ===
The People's Movement organized a meeting on 5 January 2013 to discuss subjects such as a new model for development, independence of justice, the nature of the political regime and the martyrs and wounded of the revolution. The focus of the meeting was an initiative of national unification. According to Mohamed Brahmi, the present crisis would be resolved by a political alliance of all democratic forces apart from Ennahda (Renaissance) and Nidaa Tounes. It would include the Republican Party, El Watd, the Social Democratic Path, Ettalia, the Ba'ath party, Ettakatol, the Congress for the Republic and the UGTT.

The Popular Front (Front populaire pour la réalisation des objectifs de la révolution) is a coalition of left, nationalist and green political parties founded on 7 October 2012 as an alternative to the secular coalition of Nidaa Tounes and to the "troïka", the coalition of ruling parties that includes the Islamist Ennahda, the Congress for the Republic and Ettakatol. The Popular Front spokesman is Hamma Hammami, secretary general of the Workers' Party. Chokri Belaïd, who was murdered on 6 February 2013, was the leader of the Democratic Patriots' Movement, which belonged to the front. On 30 April 2013 Mohamed Brahmi made an official announcement on radio Shems FM that the People's movement would join the Popular Front coalition. He said that he thought the Popular Front was essential for Tunisia since it provided the hope of achieving the goals of the revolution: justice, democracy and productivity.

=== Assassination of Brahmi ===
Brahmi left the People's Movement in July 2013 to form a new organization. When he quit on 7 July he said that Islamists had infiltrated the Popular Movement. (Note: However, in an interview published on 21 July 2013 a few days before his death Brahmi said that his former party could not be accused of infidelity and atheism, and that he personally had made the pilgrimage four times.) Four members of the political bureau of the party, as well as coordinators of regional offices and dozens of supporters, also resigned from the party after a strategy session that discussed the party position on national and pan-Arab issues, political Islam and the coalition with the Popular Front. A 17-member committee was announced to formalize the creation of a new party to be called the Courant Populaire (Popular Current). Speaking on the "Midi Show" Brahmi said that he had already written his resignation on 16 December 2012. He said he would act as interim general coordinator of the Popular Current until a congress was held to found the new party.

On 25 July 2013 Brahmi was shot dead outside his house by unknown assassins. The killers fled the scene on a motorbike. The motive was not known. Khaled Khichi, a lawyer and member of the party, announced Brahmi's death from the hospital. The killing triggered demonstrations against the government of Prime Minister Ali Laarayedh. Brahmi's state funeral was arranged for Saturday 27 July 2013. He was buried in Jellaz cemetery beside Chokri Belaid.

=== After the 2019 parliamentary elections ===
After the 2019 Tunisian parliamentary election, the newly elected MP Zouhair Maghzaoui announced in a press statement, that they will form a parliamentary bloc with the Democratic Current.
