= Selma Hédia Mabrouk =

Tunisian politician

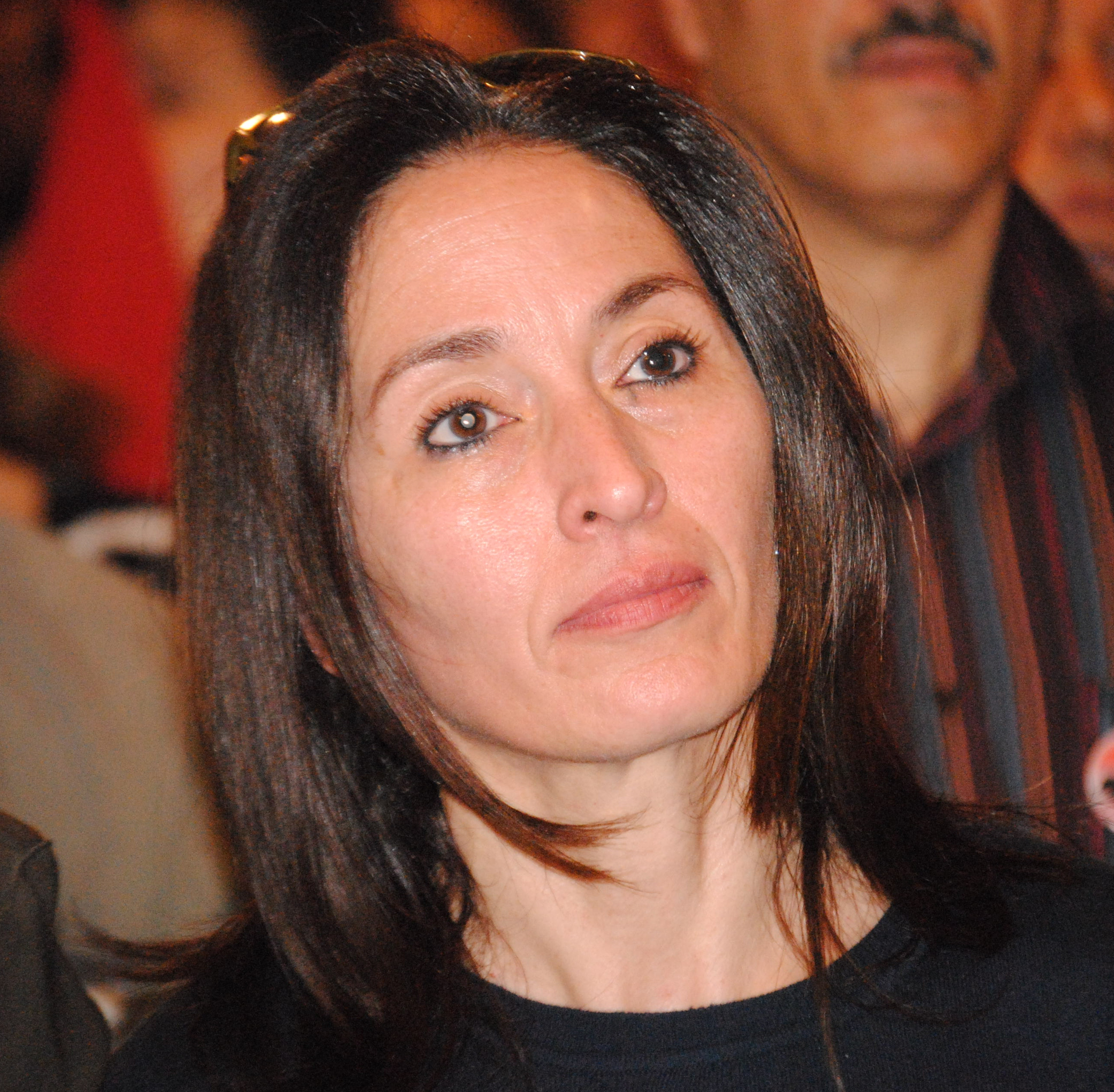
- Born: 11 October 1964 (age 61); Tunis, Tunisia
- Other name: Salma Mabrouk
- Occupations: Ophthalmologist, politician
- Years active: 2011-2015
- Political party: Ettakatol, Al Massar

Selma Hédia Mabrouk (also known as Salma Mabrouk) is a secular Tunisian politician who served on the 2011 Tunisian Constituent Assembly as a representative of Ettakatol party for the Ben Arous district. She made international headlines when she revealed that the initial draft of the constitution was attempting to define women as a "complement with the man in the family, and an associate to the man in the development of the country." The revelation was shocking to Tunisian society, where women had achieved rights unknown in the rest of the Arab world, and caused immediate outrage. Mabrouk's social media posts were instrumental in having those passages struck from the final constitution.

== Early life ==
Selma Hédia Mabrouk was born 11 October 1964 in Tunis, Tunisia. She completed grammar school in Tunis and graduated from high school at Sadiki school. Mabrouk then enrolled at the Faculty of Medicine of Tunis, and later specialized in ophthalmology in France. Returning to Tunisia, she first worked at the public hospital and later went into private practice.

== Politics ==
After the Tunisian Revolution during the Arab Spring sparked the ousting of President Zine El Abidine Ben Ali, elections were held on 23 October 2011 to establish members for a new constituent assembly. The first task of the assembly, to be sworn in on 22 November 2011, was to draft a new constitution.

Mabrouk was elected as a representative of Ettakatol party for the Ben Arous district. The majority of seats in the new assembly, 89 of the 217 seats, went to the moderately Islamist Ennahdha party. Mabrouk was outspoken in February, 2012 about the initial attempt to base the new constitution on Sharia Law and took to social media when verbiage was inserted in the constitutional draft that women were complements to men and that their rights were protected as men's partners rather than as human beings valid in their own right. Public outcry and large protests followed and the text was ultimately deleted.

On 9 October 2012 Mabrouk and 3 colleagues announced their resignations from Ettakatol, primarily because they believed that the party was not doing enough to curb the majority party, Ennahdha's movement toward a more authoritarian Islamic constitution. On 25 March 2013, she joined the Al Massar party. The 6 February 2013 assassination of Chokri Belaid, a secular opposition leader followed by a second assassination in July, 2013 of another opposition leader, Mohamed Brahmi resulted in a prolonged battle for power between the secularist and Islamic factions. Mabrouk was skeptical of the appointment of Mehdi Jomaa to head the new government and abstained from voting in the Confidence Vote in January, 2014.

On 6 January 2014, Mabrouk proposed gender neutral language during the debate on Article 20 of the Tunisian constitution, but withdrew her proposal due to opposition. The final language adopted reads, "All citizens, male and female alike, have equal rights and duties, and are equal before the law without discrimination. The state guarantees to citizens individual and collective rights. It provides them with the conditions to lead a dignified life." On 9 January 2014, Article 45 which grants women equal opportunities, though not equal protection in all areas of life, and calls for the elimination of violence toward woman was also passed. On 26 January 2014, with a vote of 200 in favor, 12 against, and 4 abstentions, the new constitution was adopted.

For the October 2014 elections the Al Massar party determined to form a coalition called the Union for Tunisia. Mabrouk lost her seat as the party received no seats in 26 October elections.

== Personal life ==
Mabrouk is married and has two children. She is fluent in Arabic, English and French.
