= Basma Khalfaoui =

Tunisian lawyer and political activist

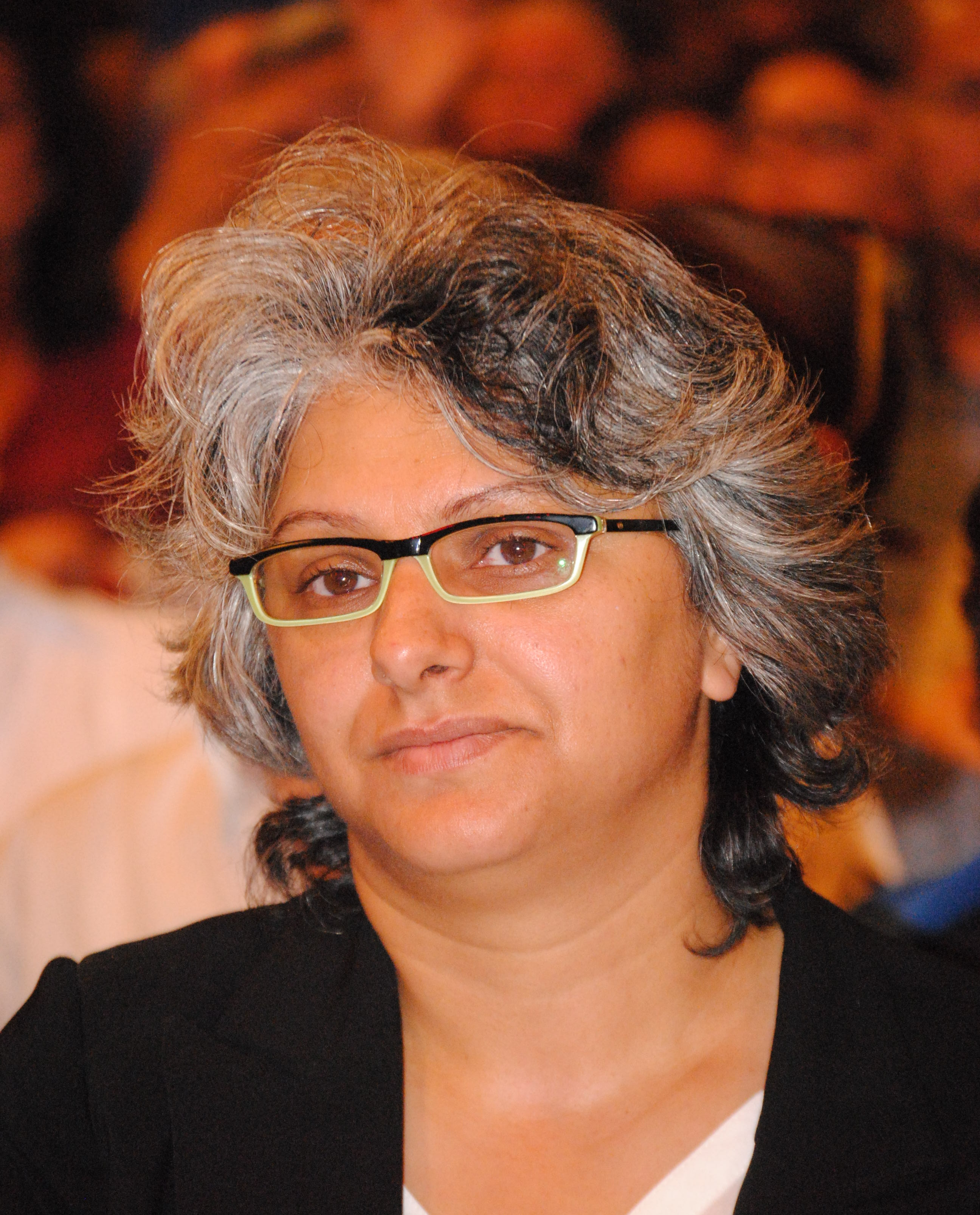
Basma Khalfaoui

Basma Khalfaoui (Arabic: بسمة خلفاوي; born 20 August 1970 in El Kef), is a Tunisian lawyer, political activist and long-time advocate for the women's movement who rose to national prominence following the assassination of her husband Chokri Belaid in 2013.

== Early life ==
Basma Khalfaoui was one of six children born to a father who died when she was very young and an uneducated mother who raised the family alone with very modest means. After finishing school at the fr:Lycée de la rue du Pacha in Tunis she studied law at university. Here she became an activist in the fr:Union générale des étudiants de Tunisie and joined the Tunisian Association of Democratic Women in 1995. At university she met Chokri Belaid in 1999, with whom she went to Paris for postgraduate studies. The couple married in Paris in 2002 before returning to Tunisia and beginning their careers as lawyers. She practised civil and property law.

== Campaign for justice ==
On 6 February 2013 her husband was assassinated by Salafist extremists in front of their home in Tunis. Khalfaoui broke with tradition by walking at the head of his funeral cortège, and was criticised for doing so by the Minister of Religious Affairs, Nouredine Khadmi. Identifying his killers, bringing them to justice, and exposing the alleged political cover-up which has protected them has been the main purpose of her work since that date.

In 2017 Khalfaoui described her husband's murder as a ‘state crime’. In 2018 her office was broken into and documents relating to her husband's case were damaged. Later she publicly called for the dissolution of the Ennahda Party, which she accused of trafficking weapons into Tunisia.

== Politics ==
She had long disclaimed any political ambition and had refused to stand in the 2014 Tunisian parliamentary election, despite having joined in 2012 the Watad Party where her late husband had been Secretary General. Nevertheless, on 21 April 2019 she announced her intention to stand in the forthcoming elections to the Tunisian Assembly. She was placed in the top-ranking position on the electoral list of the Social Democratic Union in the Tunis 1 constituency, where she ran against Rached Ghannouchi, head of the Ennahda Party, but was not elected.

== Family ==
Basma Khalfaoui has two daughters by Chokri Belaid, named Nayrouz and Nada. Early in 2022 Khalfaoui announced that she had left Tunisia because of the verbal harassment and physical threats that she had been receiving.
