= Zouhair Maghzaoui =

Tunisian politician (born 1965)

- زهير المغزاوي

Secretary-General of People's Movement
- Incumbent
- Assumed office 7 July 2013
- Preceded by: Mohamed Brahmi

Member of the Assembly of the Representatives of the People for Kebili
- In office 2 December 2014 – 13 December 2021

Personal details
- Born: 1965 (age 60–61) Kebili, Tunisia
- Party: People's Movement
- Profession: Teacher, Politician

Zouhair Maghzaoui (Arabic: زهير المغزاوي; born 1965) is a Tunisian politician and Secretary-General of the People's Movement political party since 2013 succeeding the assassinated Mohamed Brahmi.

== Biography ==
Zouheir Maghzaoui is an advocate of pan-Arab Nasserism.

He became involved in political activism at an early age by belonging to "clandestine" groups within educational institutions within the nationalist current.

He joined the University of Tunis at the Faculty of Science of Tunis where he continued to be politically active within the organization of progressive unionist Arab students. He obtained a bachelor's degree and a diploma in advanced studies in mathematics, joined the union work immediately after graduating from university, began teaching as a mathematics professor in the city of Souk al-Ahad, then joined Tunis where he studied in Sidi Hassine and founded the Basic Syndicate for Secondary Education in the region and then joined the Basic Syndicate in La Marsa and took over the general secretary. He joined the General Syndicate for Secondary Education in 2005 and then in 2009.

He participated in the establishment of the People's Unionist Progressive Movement, which merged in 2012 with the People's Movement and then took over its general secretariat, succeeding Mohamed Brahmi, who resigned from the movement in 2013.

During the 2014 Tunisian legislative elections the movement nominated him at the top of the list in the Kebili constituency, where he won a seat in the Assembly of the Representatives of the People. In the 2019 Tunisian legislative elections, he was re-elected as a deputy for the same constituency.

Known for his socially conservative positions in general and Islamist movements in particular, he is among the opponents of former Speaker of Parliament Rached Ghannouchi, where he signed on two occasions a motion of no confidence against him along with his parliamentary group.

He supported the decision of President Kais Saied during the 2021 Tunisian self-coup to dismiss the government, dissolve the parliament and lift the immunity of its deputies.

In August 2024, he presented himself as a candidate for the presidential election, scheduled for 6 October 2024. He is among two candidates who are running against President Saied.
