= Popular Front (Tunisia) =

Alliance of political parties in Tunisia

Popular Front الجبهة الشعبية
- French name: Front populaire
- Abbreviation: ej-Jabha
- Spokesperson: Hamma Hammami
- Founded: 7 October 2012
- Ideology: Socialism; Secularism; Arab nationalism Pan-Arabism Factions: Arab socialism Ba'athism Hoxhaism Marxism Marxism–Leninism Nasserism Maoism Trotskyism
- Political position: Left-wing to far-left
- Colors: Red
- Parties: List: Democratic Patriots' Unified Party Tunisian Ba'ath Movement Workers' Left League Workers' Party others
- Assembly of the Representatives of the People: 2 / 217

Website
- front-populaire.org

The Popular Front for the Realization of the Objectives of the Revolution (Arabic: الجبهة الشعبية لتحقيق أهداف الثورة; French: Front populaire pour la réalisation des objectifs de la révolution), abbreviated as the Popular Front (ej-Jabha), is a leftist political and electoral alliance in Tunisia. On 7 October 2012, the coalition was formed and included 12 left-wing Tunisian parties. The main objective for the creation of the Popular Front was to reduce the political divide between Nida Tounes and Ennahda.

== Emergence of the Popular Front ==
The Popular Front was formed in response to the fragmentation of Tunisia's secular and left wing opposition after the 2011 revolution. Individual parties struggled to compete with stronger forces such as Ennahda, leading to weak electoral performance and limited influence. This coalition aimed to unify socialist, nationalist and progressive groups into a single bloc, to strengthen opposition power. Furthermore, they wanted to offer a coordinated alternative in an increasingly polarized political system.

This left-wing coalition was seen by leftists as a long held ambition that had finally been realized. They believe that a united and cohesive left was essential for achieving progressive change during Tunisia's post-revolution transition.

Among the 12 members in the coalition were the Democratic Patriots' Unified Party, the Workers' Party, Green Tunisia, the Movement of Socialist Democrats (which has since left), the Tunisian Ba'ath Movement and Arab Democratic Vanguard Party, two different parties of the Iraqi branch of Ba'ath Party, and other progressive parties. The number of parties involved in the coalition has since decreased to 9. Approximately 15,000 people attended the coalition's first meeting in Tunis. In 2015, three years after their establishment, the Popular Front held 15 out of the 217 seats in the Assembly of the Representatives in Tunisia.

== Fundamentals ==
The Popular Front advocated for a democratic and civilian state founded on popular sovereignty, judicial independence and equality between citizens. It strongly supported separating religion from politics and maintaining an independent foreign policy. Especially against western and Gulf Arab influence.

Economically, it called for national control over resources and reforms to international agreements that did not favor Tunisian people. Fair taxation and stronger social rights, such as healthcare, education, housing and workers's protections were non-negotiable.

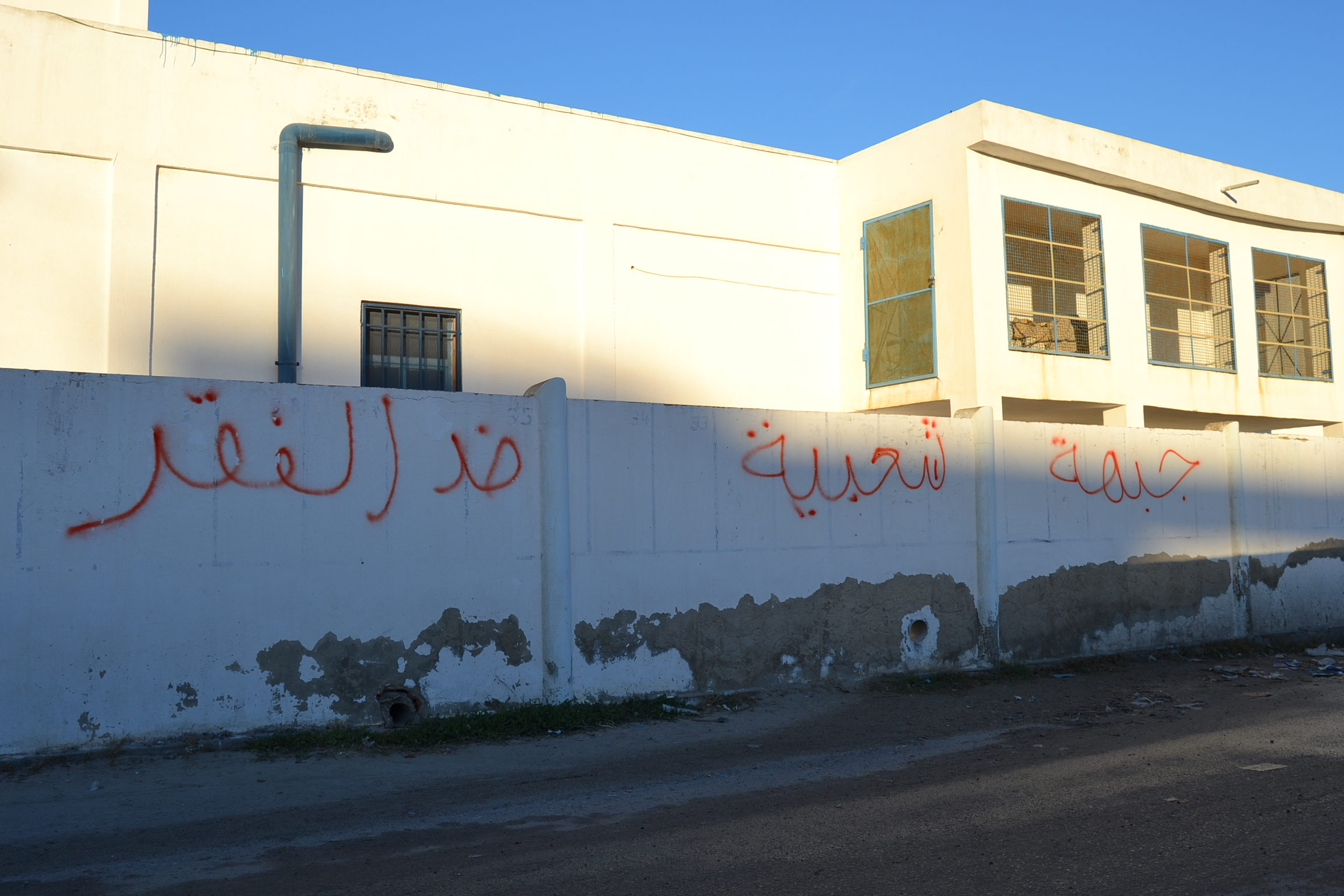
Graffiti tag on wall reading "Popular Front against Poverty."

In culture and education, it promoted academic and artistic freedom, a democratic education system and the protection of Arab identity and language. Values such as citizenship, solidarity and human rights were crucial for realizing a secular, democratic state. Overall, the Popular Front aimed to continue the revolutionary process that the Tunisians started and strengthen popular political power.

== History ==
In 2011, the Tunisian Revolution saw the departure of President Zine El Abidine Ben Ali, the dissolution of his party, the Democratic Constitutional Rally, and the holding of fresh elections for the creation of a new constitution. This saw the Tunisian political scene dominated by the Islamist Ennahda Movement, and its allies the Democratic Forum for Labour and Liberties, the Progressive Democratic Party, and the Congress for the Republic.

Former Prime Minister Béji Caïd Essebsi then decided to return to Tunisian political life, and formed a new party known as the Nidaa Tounes, which is mostly composed of secular Tunisians, including centrists and those who are more right wing, including former supporters of the RCD. Twelve leftist parties then decided to form a Popular Front in order to better consolidate the previously divided Tunisian left wing so as to be able to compete more effectively in the 2014 Tunisian parliamentary election.

=== Murder of Chokri Belaid ===
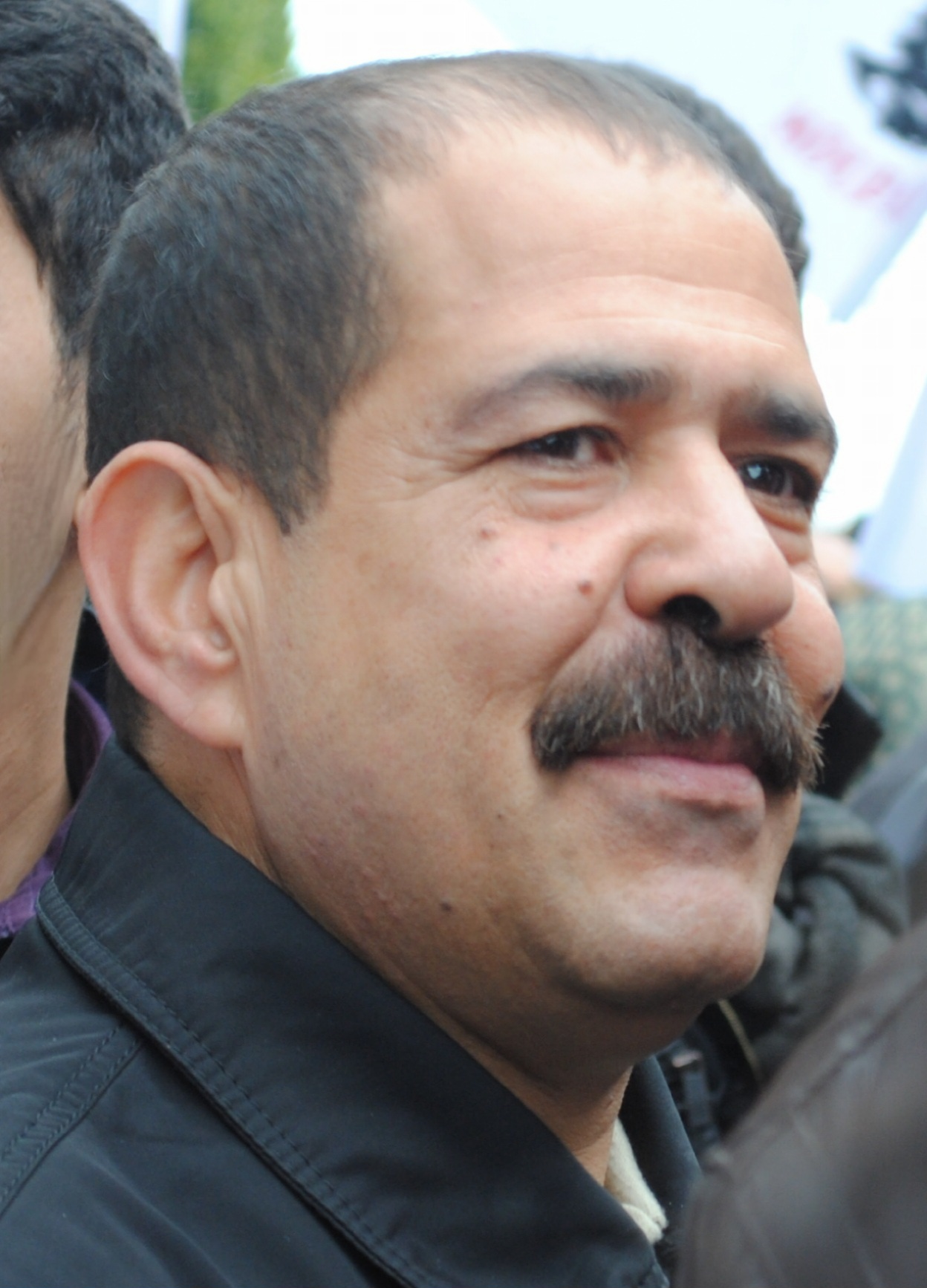
Chokri Belaid

On 6 February 2013, the 48-year-old coordinator of the Popular Front coalition, Chokri Belaid, was killed by an unknown gunman. An estimated 1,400,000 people took part in his funeral, while protesters clashed with police and Ennahda supporters, who held a separate rally, attended by an estimated 15,000 people, on the day of the funeral defending the party against calls to give up power. The ruling Ennahda Movement denied involvement in his death. The Popular Front, along with the secular Republican Party and Nidaa Tounes, subsequently announced they would withdraw from the national assembly and call for a general strike.

=== Murder of Mohamed Brahmi ===
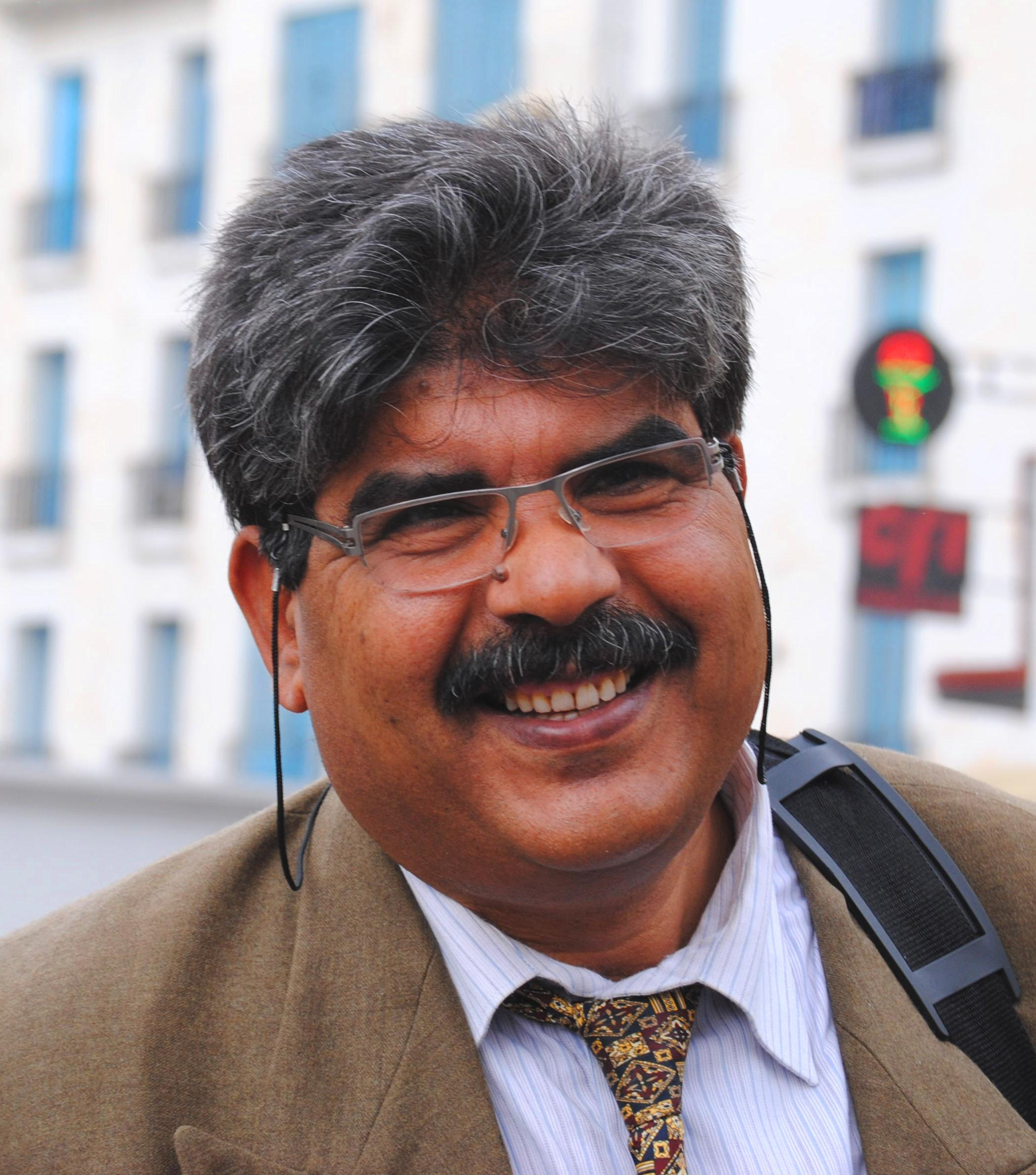
Mohamed Brahmi

On 9 April 2013, Mohamed Brahmi, General Secretary of the minor People's Movement, which held 2 seats in the National Constituent Assembly, announced the decision of his party to join the Popular Front. Mohamed Brahmi was assassinated outside his home on July 25, 2013. It was later confirmed that the gun used for this assassination had also been used in the murder of Chokri Belaid. Numerous protests erupted in the streets following Brahmi's assassination.

=== Aftermath of the protests ===
These protests resulted in what is now called the 2013-2014 Tunisian Political Crisis. Due to these protests, the leading party of the government (the Ennahda party) resigned, even though the party denied any involvement. In 2014, an election was held, and a new constitution was adopted.

== Collapse ==
The Popular Front collapsed in 2019 due to growing internal divisions between two of its main factions, the Worker's Party and the Democratic Patriots' Unified Party. There were disputes over leadership, electoral alliances, strategic direction and internal decision making. The conflicts weakened the coalition severely. Accusations of authoritarian leadership, exclusion and organizational imbalance intensified tensions and deepened the split within the alliance.

The coalition's decline was also partly due to the fragmentation of Tunisia's post-2014 party system. As the secular Islamist polarization weakened and elite consensus politics emerged, the Popular Front lost its role as an alternative opposition force. Internal fragmentation, weakened voter support and the rise of newer political parties further reduced its influence and parliamentary relevance after 2014.

== Current Events ==
Since Kais Saied was elected in 2019, the Assembly of the Representatives of the People has seen a lot of change. After the 2021 Tunisian self-coup, the Assembly was suspended. In December 2022 and January 2023, new elections were held for the Assembly of the Representatives of the People. However, only 11% of eligible voters voted, and they were able to fill only 154 seats out of the 161 members that were meant to be elected. For this election, candidates had to run as individuals and were not allowed to be on party lists. This impacted the power of political parties.

The Popular Front has collapsed in 2019, but the parties still exist. However, since the Coup of 2021, the political parties have become less influential. Many members, like Hamma Hammami, are still important voices for the opposition. Hammami, in particular, was very active in the 2022 protests against Kais Saied's rule.

== Election Results ==
Election year	# of total votes	% of overall vote	# of seats
Assembly of the Representatives of the People
2014	124,654	3,66%	15 / 217
2019	32,365	1.13%	1 / 217

== Member parties ==
- Workers' Party (PT; formerly Tunisian Workers' Communist Party) led by Hamma Hammami. (Marxism–Leninism)
- Party of United Democratic Patriots (Watad), merger of:
  - Democratic Patriots' Movement (MOUPAD) led by Ziad Lakhdhar, formerly led by Chokri Belaid, until his assassination. (Marxism–Leninism, Maoism, Pan-Arabism)
  - Democratic Patriotic Workers' Party (PTPD), led by Mohamed Jmour. (Marxism–Leninism)
- Tunisian Ba'ath Movement led by Othmen Bel Haj Amor, part of the pro-Iraqi Ba'ath Party. (Ba'athism)
- People's Current, founded in July 2013 by Mohamed Brahmi after his resignation from the Popular Movement and shortly before his assassination, now led by Zouhair Hamdi and Brahmi's widow Mbarka Aouainia.
- The Pole (al Qotb), led by Riadh Ben Fadhel, joined the Popular Front in June 2013.
- Workers' Left League (LGO), led by Jalel Ben Brik Zoghlami. (Trotskyism)
- Popular Party for Liberty and Progress (PPLP) led by Jalloul Azzouna. (Socialism)
- Arab Democratic Vanguard Party led by Kheireddine Souabni. (Ba'athism)
- Unionist Popular Front led by Amor Mejri. (Pan-Arabism, Marxism)

=== Former ===
These parties were temporarily affiliated with the Popular Front, but have left it:

- Movement of Socialist Democrats (MDS) (Democratic socialism)
- People's Movement formerly led by Mohamed Brahmi (Arab nationalism, Nasserism)
- Progressive People's Party, led by Mohamed Lassoued (Marxism–Leninism)
- Green Tunisia Party, led by Abdelkader Zitouni (Eco-socialism, Green politics)

== See also ==
- Popular Unity Movement
- Popular Unity Party (Tunisia)
- Socialist Party (Tunisia)
- Union for Tunisia
- Unionist Democratic Union
