= Rached Ghannouchi =

Tunisian leader of the Ennahdha Party since 1991

- راشد الغنوشي
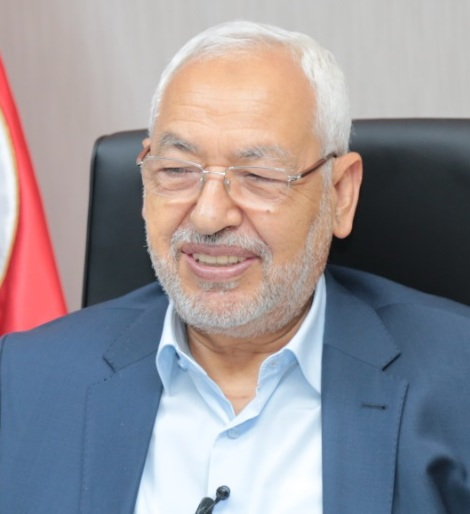
- Ghannouchi in 2017

2nd Speaker of the Assembly of the Representatives of the People
- In office 13 November 2019 – 25 July 2021
- President: Kais Saied
- Prime Minister: Youssef Chahed; Elyes Fakhfakh; Hichem Mechichi
- Preceded by: Abdelfattah Mourou (interim)
- Succeeded by: Ibrahim Bouderbala

President of the Ennahda Movement
- Incumbent
- Assumed office November 1991
- Preceded by: Walid Bennani

Personal details
- Born: Rashad Khriji; 22 June 1941 (age 85) El Hamma, French Tunisia
- Party: Ennahda Movement
- Parent: Sheikh Muhammad (father)
- Education: Cairo University; Damascus University
- Website: www.rachedelghannouchi.com

Rached Ghannouchi (Arabic: راشد الغنوشي, romanized: Rāshid al-Ghannūshī; born 22 June 1941), also spelled Rachid al-Ghannouchi or Rached el-Ghannouchi, is a Tunisian politician, the co-founder of the Ennahdha Party and serving as its intellectual leader. He was born as Rashid al-Khriji (Arabic: راشد الخريجي, romanized: Rāshid al-Khrijī).

Ghannouchi was named one of Time's 100 Most Influential People in the World in 2012 and Foreign Policy's Top 100 Global Thinkers and was awarded the Chatham House Prize in 2012 (alongside Tunisian President Moncef Marzouki) by Prince Andrew, Duke of York, for "the successful compromises each achieved during Tunisia's democratic transition". In 2016, he received the Jamnalal Bajaj Award for "promoting Gandhian values outside India". On 13 November 2019, Ghannouchi was elected Speaker of the Assembly of the Representatives of the People. Ghannouchi narrowly survived a vote of no confidence after 97 MPs voted against him on 30 July 2020, falling short of 109 needed to oust him as Speaker of the House.

== Early life ==
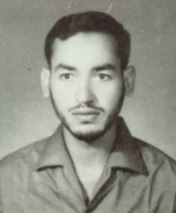
Ghannouchi in 1967.

Ghannouchi was born outside El Hamma, in the governorate of Gabès in southern Tunisia. His village had no electricity or paved roads. His father was a poor farmer with children including Rached. His family worked in the fields every day, and had meat to eat only a few times a year. After the ground season had ended, the family wove baskets from palm leaves to supplement its income. Rached was able to attend a local branch of the traditional Arabic-language Zaytouna school thanks to financial help from an older brother.

He received his certificate of attainment degree, equivalent to the Baccalauréat, in 1962 from the University of Ez-Zitouna (Zaytouna). He entered the school of agriculture at Cairo University in 1964 but, following the expulsion of Tunisians from Egypt, he left for Syria. He studied philosophy at the University of Damascus, graduating in 1968. Ghannouchi also spent some time in his 20s traveling and working in Europe as a grape picker and dish washer.

== Islamic Tendency Movement ==
In April 1981 Ghannouchi founded the Islamic Tendency Movement (Arabic: حركة الاتجاه الإسلامي Ḥarakat al-Ittijāh al-Islāmī). The Movement described itself as specifically rooted in non-violent Islamism, and called for a "reconstruction of economic life on a more equitable basis, the end of single-party politics and the acceptance of political pluralism and democracy." By the end of July, Ghannouchi and his followers were arrested, sentenced to eleven years in prison in Bizerte, and were tortured. Both the religious and secular community, including numerous secular political organizations, rallied in his support. While in prison he translated a number of works and wrote on topics such as democracy, women's rights, and Palestine. He also wrote his most noted work, Al‐Hurriyat al‐'Ammah (Public Liberties).

He was released in 1984, but returned to prison in 1987 with a life sentence, then was again released in 1988. He moved to the United Kingdom as a political exile, where he lived for 22 years.

He attended The Islamic Committee for Palestine conference in Chicago in 1989. Following the 1990 invasion of Kuwait, Al-Ghannushi denounced King Fahd of Saudi Arabia for the "colossal crime" of inviting the U.S. to deploy forces. He also called for a Muslim boycott of American goods, planes and ships. He has also been criticized for calling for jihad against Israel.

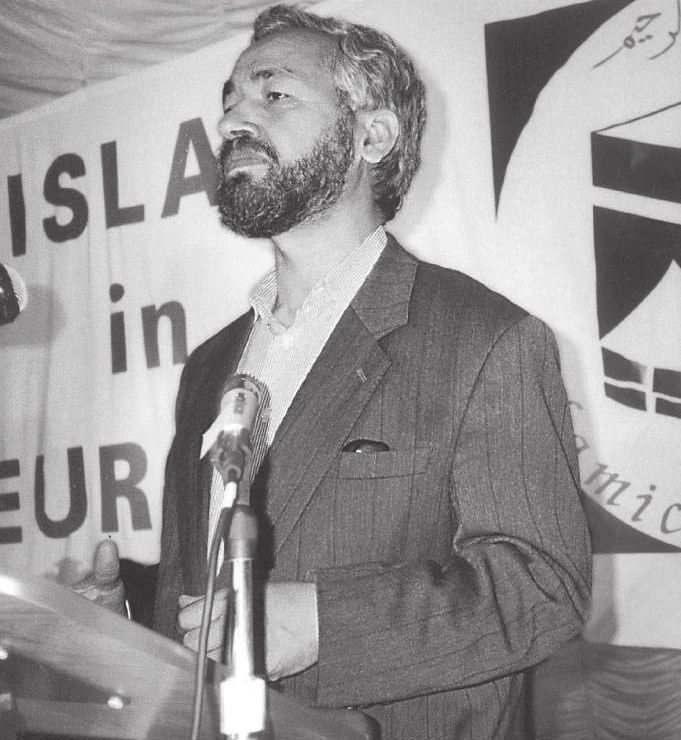
Rachid Al-Ghannouchi speaking in an Islamist rally circa 1980.

Ghannouchi continued to criticise Tunisian politics and the regime of President Zine El Abidine Ben Ali.

== Tunisian Revolution and after ==
Following popular unrest in which Ben Ali was ousted, Ghannouchi returned to Tunisia on 30 January 2011, after spending twenty two years exiled in London, with thousands of people welcoming him.

His party won 37.04% of the vote (more than the next four biggest vote-getting parties combined) in the 2011 Tunisian Constituent Assembly election. Ghannouchi did not take a government position. Ennahdha's secretary-general Hamadi Jebali became Prime Minister.

Ennahda formed a government which led Tunisia through the challenging and tumultuous aftermath of the Jasmine revolution. The government during this period was characterized by greater transparency, lack of corruption, and consensus-building. In March 2012, Ennahda declared it would not support making sharia the main source of legislation in the new constitution, maintaining the secular nature of the state. Ennahda's stance on the issue was criticized by hardline Islamists, who wanted strict sharia, but was welcomed by secular parties. The government was criticized for mediocre economic performance, not stimulating the tourism industry, and poor relations with Tunisia's biggest trading partner France. In particular it was criticized for tolerating efforts at aggressive Islamisation by radical Islamists who were demanding Sharia law and denouncing gender equality and restrictions on polygamy, some of whom were responsible for the September 2012 ransacking and burning of the American embassy and school following the assassination of two leftist politicians Chokri Belaid (in February 2013) and Mohamed Brahmi (in July 2013). During this 2013–14 Tunisian political crisis enraged secularists demanded the government step down or even a Sisi-style coup, while Ennahda militants defiantly opposed early elections, even booing Ghannouchi's calls for sacrifice for national unity.

Nonetheless Ghanouchi worked with secularist leader Beji Caid Essebsi to forge a compromise and on October 5 signed a "road map" whereby Ennahda would step down for a caretaker government after the new constitution was agreed upon and until new elections were held. Both leaders were heavily criticized by their party rank and file and Ghannouchi received agreement from the Ennahda shura council only by threatening to resign.

In January 2014, after the new Tunisian Constitution was approved, Ennahdha peacefully quit government and handed power to a technocratic government led by Mehdi Jomaa. Ennahda placed second in the October 2014 parliamentary election with 27.79% of the popular vote and formed a coalition government with the larger secularist party Nidaa Tounes despite rank-and-file opposition. Ennahda did not put forth a presidential candidate for the November 2014 election. Ghanouchi "hinted broadly" that he personally supported Beji Caid Essebsi (who won with over 55% of the vote).

Ghannouchi argued for these accommodating measures against more purist party members on the grounds that the country was still too fragile, and the economy too much in need of reform, for Ennahda to be in opposition. Ghannouchi also gave his support to a crackdown on jihadi indoctrination at radical mosques (over 60 civilians, mostly tourists, were killed in 2015 by jihadis, devastating Tunisia's tourist industry). Despite his Islamist background, he had always been "reviled" by jihadis, according to Robert Worth, and now appeared near "the top" of the jihadi "wanted list".

=== Retracted allegations ===
On 22 October 2011, The Economist published an apology on their website for previously publishing an article in which they attributed false statements to Ghannouchi. The article claimed that Ghannouchi "opposes the country's liberal code of individual rights, the Code of Personal Status, and its prohibition of polygamy". The article, also, claimed that Ghannouchi "has threatened to hang a prominent Tunisian feminist, Raja bin Salama, in Basij Square in Tunis, because she has called for the country's new laws to be based on the Universal Declaration of Human Rights". The apology stated that "we accept that neither of these statements is true: Mr Ghannouchi has expressly said that he accepts the Code of Personal Status; and he never threatened to hang Ms bin Salama. We apologise to him unreservedly."

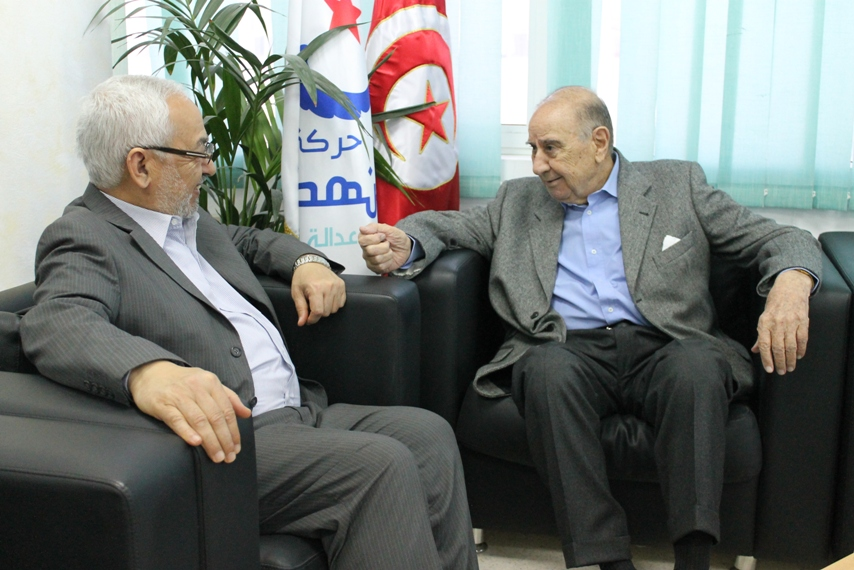
Rached Ghannouchi meeting with Roger Bismuth, representative of the Jewish community in Tunisia, at the movement’s headquarters in 2012

On 9 October 2012, The Independent published an apology on their website for suggesting in a previous article that the Ennahdha Party has been offered foreign funds. The apology stated: "we wish to make it clear that Mr. Ghannouchi and his party have not accepted any donation from a foreign state in breach of Tunisian party funding laws. We apologise to Mr. Ghannouchi."

On 17 May 2013, the BBC published an apology on their website for previously publishing inaccurate statements about Ghannouchi six months earlier on 21 November 2012. The article had accused Ghannouchi of threatening to order troops on to the streets if the Ennahdha Party did not get the results he expected in the elections in 2011, and suggested he condoned the violent Salafist attack on the United States embassy and the burning of the American School in Tunis in September 2012. Acknowledging that none of these accusations and suggestions were in fact true, the retraction concluded: "The BBC apologises to Mr Ghannouchi for these mistakes and for the distress they caused him."

=== Libel case ===
In 2020, the UK High Court ruled in favour of Ghannouchi in a libel case against Middle East Online (MEO) and its editor Haitham El Zobaidi. Middle East Online and one of its editors had claimed that Ennahda "supported terrorism", a charge Ghannouchi "vigorously denied". According to Ahmed Yusuf, the article was part of a "a systematic campaign" against Ghannouchi from "media backed by Saudi Arabia, the United Arab Emirates (UAE) and Egypt."

=== Corruption charges ===
On 1 February 2024, Rached Ghannouchi was sentenced along with his son-in-law to three years in prison by the Tunis court, for illicit foreign financing, and ordered to pay a fine of $1.17 million on behalf of his party. On 19 February, he went on a hunger strike in prison in solidarity with other opposition figures imprisoned by Saied's government. On 13 July 2024, his sentence to three years in prison was confirmed by the Criminal Chamber of the Judicial and Financial Unit. On 8 July 2025, he was sentenced to 14 years' imprisonment on terrorism charges. On 14 January 2026, his sentence was extended to 22 years in prison. On 2 June 2026, Ghannouchi was sentenced to life imprisonment on charges of terrorism.

In July 2026, it was reported that Ghannouchi had lost consciousness in prison due to an "extreme heatwave" at Mornaguia prison.

== Views ==
=== On Islamism ===
According to Azzam S. Tamimi, he was influenced by Malik Bennabi and his treatise "Islam and Democracy", which laid "the foundations" for Ghannouchi's "masterpiece" Al‐Hurriyat al‐'Ammah (Public Liberties). In 2002, Martin Kramer described him as differing "from other Islamists" in his insistence "that Islam accepts multi-party democracy." While Observer Robert Worth credits Ghannouchi with willingness to compromise with secularists in Tunisia and his country's unique success in maintaining a democratic system following the Arab Spring. Unlike many Islamists, Ghannouchi "lived abroad for decades, reading widely in three languages", including Western thinkers Karl Marx, Sigmund Freud and Jean-Paul Sartre. He admired the courage of leftists who protested in the streets against the dictatorship, were arrested and tortured in prison, and became willing to work with them. Watching the initial victory of the Algerian Islamists—while exiled in London—collapse into the slaughter, mayhem and defeat of the civil war, left a deep impact.

=== On Homosexuality ===
In 2015, he told French journalist Olivier Ravanello that homosexuality should not be criminalized, though he opposed gay marriage. He has been interviewed by Michael Moore in Where to Invade Next and stated that homosexuality is a "private affair."

== Personal life ==
On 13 July 2021, the official TAP news agency reported that Ghannouchi, already vaccinated, tested positive for COVID-19. On 1 August, he was discharged a few hours after he was readmitted to a hospital.

== Awards ==
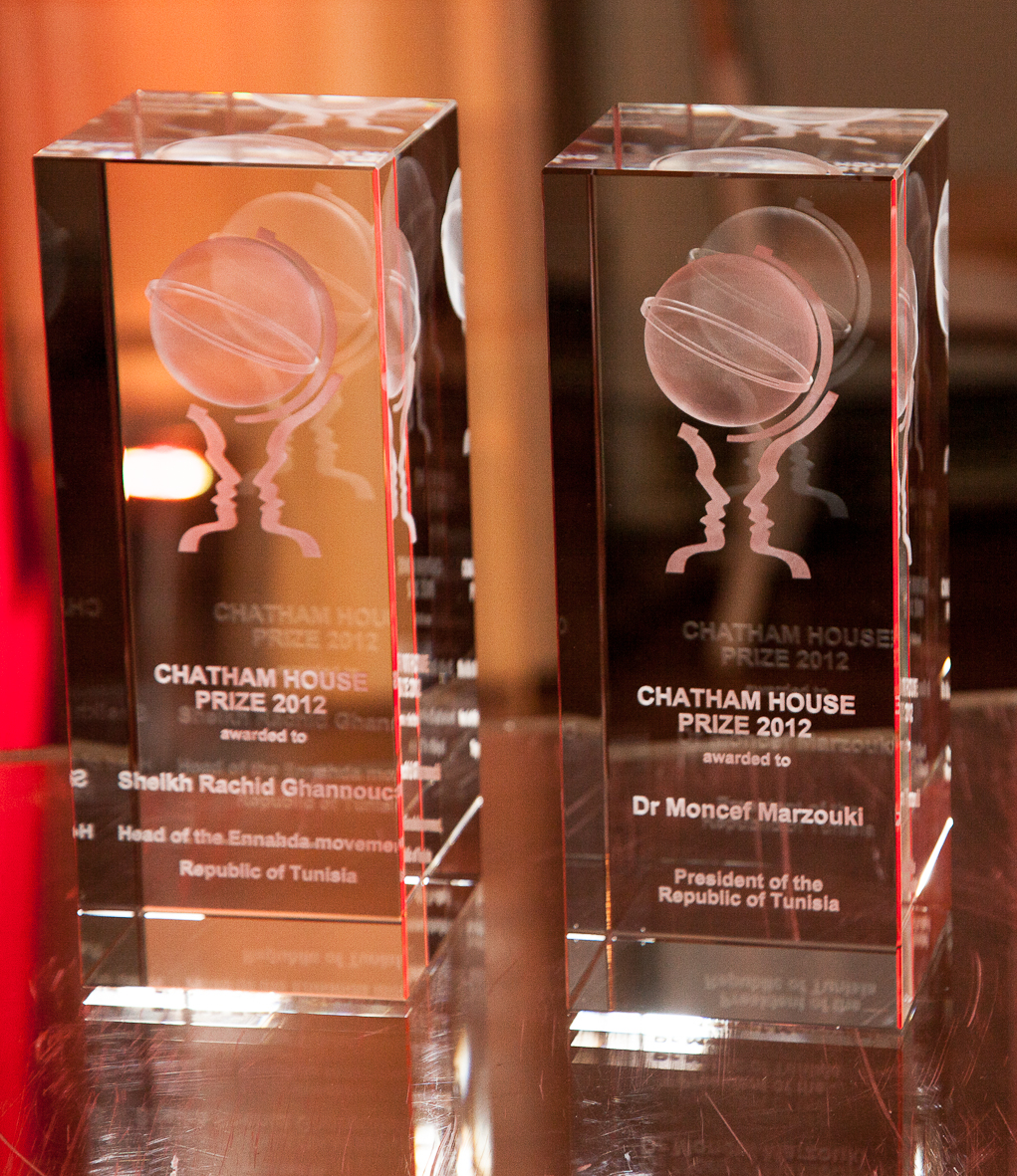
Chatham House prize in 2012, Ghannouchi and Marzouki.

- One of the first in FP Top 100 Global Thinkers in 2011
- The Chatham House Prize from Chatham House for the year 2012 in London (with Moncef Marzouki)
- The Ibn Rushd Prize for Freedom of Thought for the year 2014 in Berlin
- Lifetime membership of Aligarh Muslim University Students' Union in 2015
- International Crisis Group's Founder's Award for pioneers in peace-building, along with Tunisian President Béji Caïd Essebsi
- The Jamnalal Bajaj Award for the year 2016 in Mumbai
- Honorary Degree from International Islamic University Malaysia in 2017
- One of the 100 Most Influential Arabs in the World in Global Influence list 2018
