= Socialist Party (Tunisia) =

Socialist Party حزب الاشتراكي
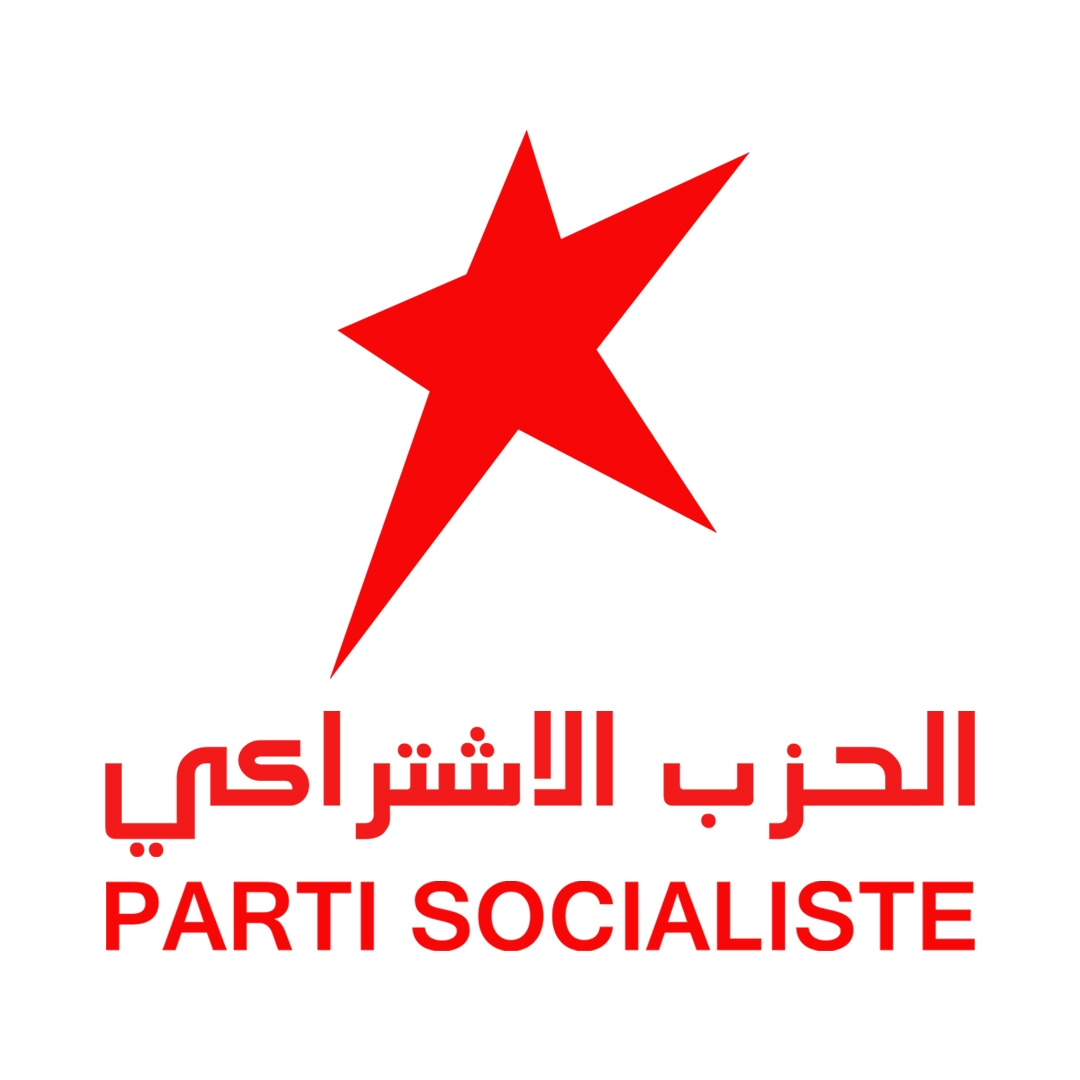
- French name: Parti socialiste
- Secretary-General: Mohamed Kilani
- Founded: 1 October 2006
- Legalized: 17 January 2011
- Split from: Tunisian Workers' Communist Party
- Ideology: Socialism; Marxism
- Political position: Left-wing

Website
- www.parti-socialiste.tn

The Socialist Party (Arabic: الحزب الاشتراكي; French: Parti socialiste, or PS), is a socialist party in Tunisia. Established in 2006 under its original name Left Socialist Party (Arabic: الحزب الاشتراكي اليساري; French: Parti socialiste de gauche, or PSG), the party did not achieve legal party status until 2011.

== History ==
The party was established in 2006 as a split from banned Tunisian Workers' Communist Party. Under the rule of Zine El Abidine Ben Ali, the new party however remained illegal, too, until the Tunisian Revolution in 2011.

On 17 January 2011, the party was legalized together with two other opposition parties. It subsequently contested the 2011 Constituent Assembly election as part of the Democratic Modernist Pole alliance, which won five out of the 217 seats.

On 3 October 2012, the party adopted its new name, dropping "Left Socialist Party" in favor of simply "Socialist Party". It participated in the Union for Tunisia alliance to contest the 2014 legislative election, but eventually withdrew and filed its own lists, which however didn't manage to win a seat.
