= Workers' Left League =

Tunisian political party

Workers' Left League رابطة العمال اليسارية
- French name: Ligue de la gauche ouvrière
- Leader: Jalel Ben Brik Zoghlami
- Ideology: Trotskyism
- National affiliation: Popular Front
- International affiliation: Fourth International

The Workers' Left League is a Trotskyist political party in Tunisia led by Jalel Ben Brik Zoghlami. The party It participates in the leftist Popular Front. The party has ties to the French New Anticapitalist Party.
