= Ziad Lakhdhar =

Tunisian politician

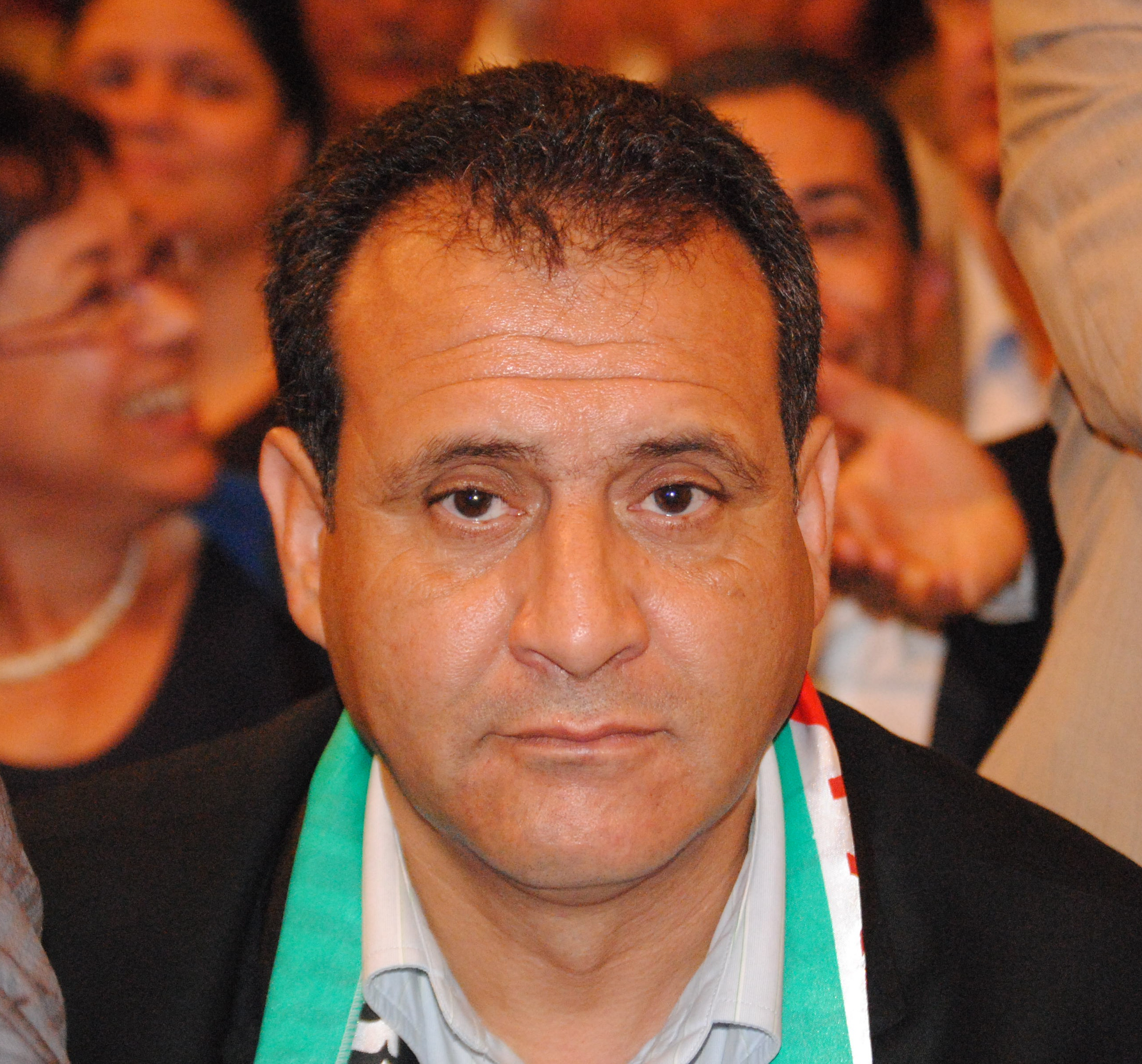
- Lakhdhar in 2013

Secretary General of the Democratic Patriots' Movement
- In office 6 February 2013 – Present

Personal details
- Party: Democratic Patriots' Movement
- Other political affiliations: Popular Front

Ziad Lakhdhar is a Tunisian politician. He is the secretary-general of the Democratic Patriots' Movement (DPM) and a prominent leader of the Popular Front, a left-wing coalition of opposition parties and movements. He succeeded Chokri Belaid, who was assassinated on 6 February 2013, as secretary-general of the DPM.
