= Democratic Patriots' Unified Party =

Democratic Patriots' Unified Party حزب الوطنيين الديمقراطيين الموحد
- French name: Parti unifié des patriotes démocrates
- Secretary-General: Ziad Lakhdhar
- Founded: 1982
- Ideology: Communism; Marxism–Leninism; Anti-revisionism; Maoism; Arab nationalism Anti-Islamism
- National affiliation: Popular Front
- Colors: Red, white
- Assembly of the Representatives of the People: 2 / 217

Website
- www.wataduni.org

The Democratic Patriots' Unified Party (Arabic: حزب الوطنيين الديمقراطيين الموحد), formerly the Democratic Patriots' Movement, is a Marxist-Leninist party in Tunisia. Established in 1981, the movement was only legalised in 2011 after the Tunisian Revolution. The movement primarily advocates a parliamentary system, the balanced development of the peasantry and light industry, and campaigns against the exploitation of the working classes of Tunisia. In the 2011 elections, they won one seat in the Constituent Assembly of Tunisia, Mongi Rahoui from Jendouba Constituency. In October 2012, the party formed a leftist coalition, the Popular Front, with the Workers' Party, the Tunisian Green Party, the Movement of Socialist Democrats, the Tunisian Ba'ath Movement (an Iraqi-led branch of the Ba'ath Party), and other Progressive parties. The Movement is strongly anti-Islamist.

Its secretary-general, Chokri Belaid, was shot dead on 6 February 2013.
