= Chokri Belaid =

Tunisian politician and lawyer

Chokri Belaïd
- شكري بلعيد
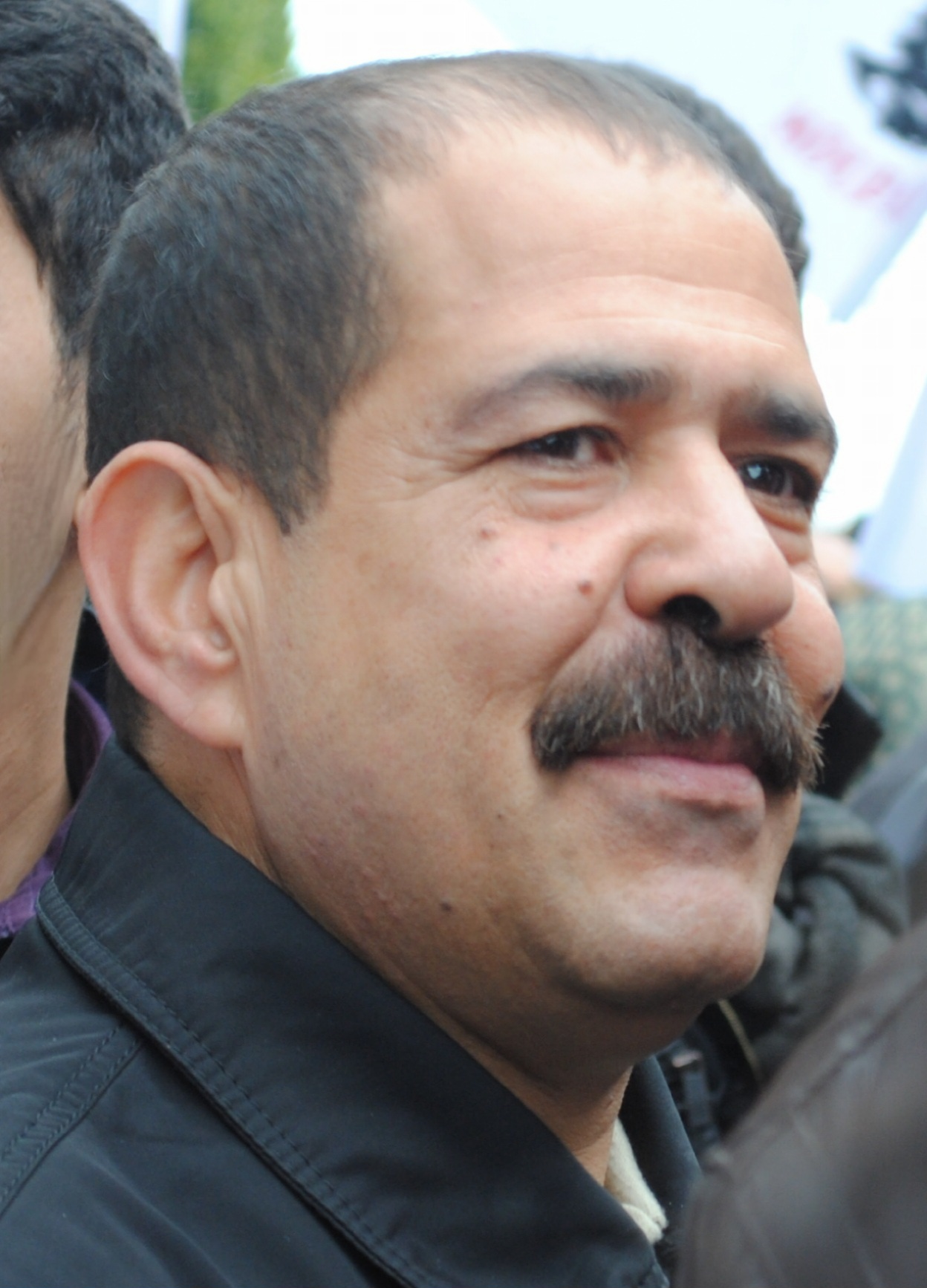
- Chokri Belaïd in 2012
- Born: 26 November 1964; Djebel Jelloud, Tunis Governorate, Tunisia
- Died: 6 February 2013 (aged 48); El Menzah, Tunis Governorate, Tunisia
- Cause of death: Assassination (multiple gunshots)
- Resting place: Al Jallez; 36°47′10″N 10°11′04″E
- Citizenship: Tunisian
- Political party: Democratic Patriots' Movement
- Spouse: Basma Khalfaoui

Chokri Belaïd (Arabic: شكري بلعيد, romanized: Shukrī Bil‘īd; 26 November 1964 – 6 February 2013), also transliterated as Shokri Belaïd, was a Tunisian politician and lawyer who was an opposition leader with the left-secular Democratic Patriots' Movement. Belaïd was a vocal critic of the Ben Ali regime prior to the 2011 Tunisian revolution and of the then Islamist-led Tunisian government. On 6 February 2013, he was fatally shot outside his house in El Menzah, close to the Tunisian capital, Tunis. As a result of his assassination, Tunisian Prime Minister Hamadi Jebali announced his plan to dissolve the existing national government and to form a temporary "national unity" government.

== Early and personal life ==
Belaïd was born in the town of Djebel Jelloud in Tunisia on 26 November 1964. He was a student activist in the 1980s. He worked as a lawyer and was also part of the defence team of former Iraqi president Saddam Hussein during his trial for crimes against humanity. He spoke out against a 2008 clampdown on miners, and was a noted political critic of Zine El Abidine Ben Ali, the strongman Tunisian leader in office for 23 years, whose 2011 self-exile to Saudi Arabia was the first tangible result of the Arab Spring uprisings. Belaid was also a poet, and one of his poems is dedicated to Lebanese intellectual Husayn Muruwwa, who was assassinated by Islamists in the late 1980s.

Belaid was married and had two daughters. The family lived in a rented apartment.

== Politics ==
Belaïd was the coordinator of the far-left Democratic Patriots' Movement, which was part of a 12-member umbrella organisation called the Popular Front. He identified with pan-Arabism and was active opponent of normalizing relations with Israel. and was a strong critic of the supporters of fundamentalist Islam, sometimes referred to as Salafists, whose confrontational tactics since the change of government in 2011 have prevented some plays and music concerts from being held in Tunisian cities. The Salafists also have been blamed for attacking the US Embassy in Tunisia in 2012.

Belaid was succeeded by Ziad Lakhdhar as secretary general of the party.

== Assassination ==
On 6 February 2013, as Belaïd was leaving his house in the neighborhood of El Menzah 6, Tunis, he was shot four times in the head and chest by Kamel Gaghgadhi, who later fled with an accomplice on a motorbike. He was rushed into the Ennasr clinic, and died there. According to Tunis Afrique Presse, Belaïd died in hospital. Belaid had reportedly received multiple death threats in the days prior to his death. The night before he was killed, Belaid said; "All those who oppose Ennahda become the targets of violence." Earlier that week, Belaïd said that the committees established out of the revolution were a "tool" used by the Islamists.

Following news of his death, police used tear gas to disperse thousands of people demonstrating in front of the Interior ministry in Tunis. Other protests spontaneously occurred in cities throughout the country, including Mezzouna, Gafsa and Sidi Bouzid, where tear gas was also used to disperse protesters. The interim President of Tunisia Moncef Marzouki cut short an overseas trip to Cairo as a result of the protests and assassination.

=== Perpetrators ===
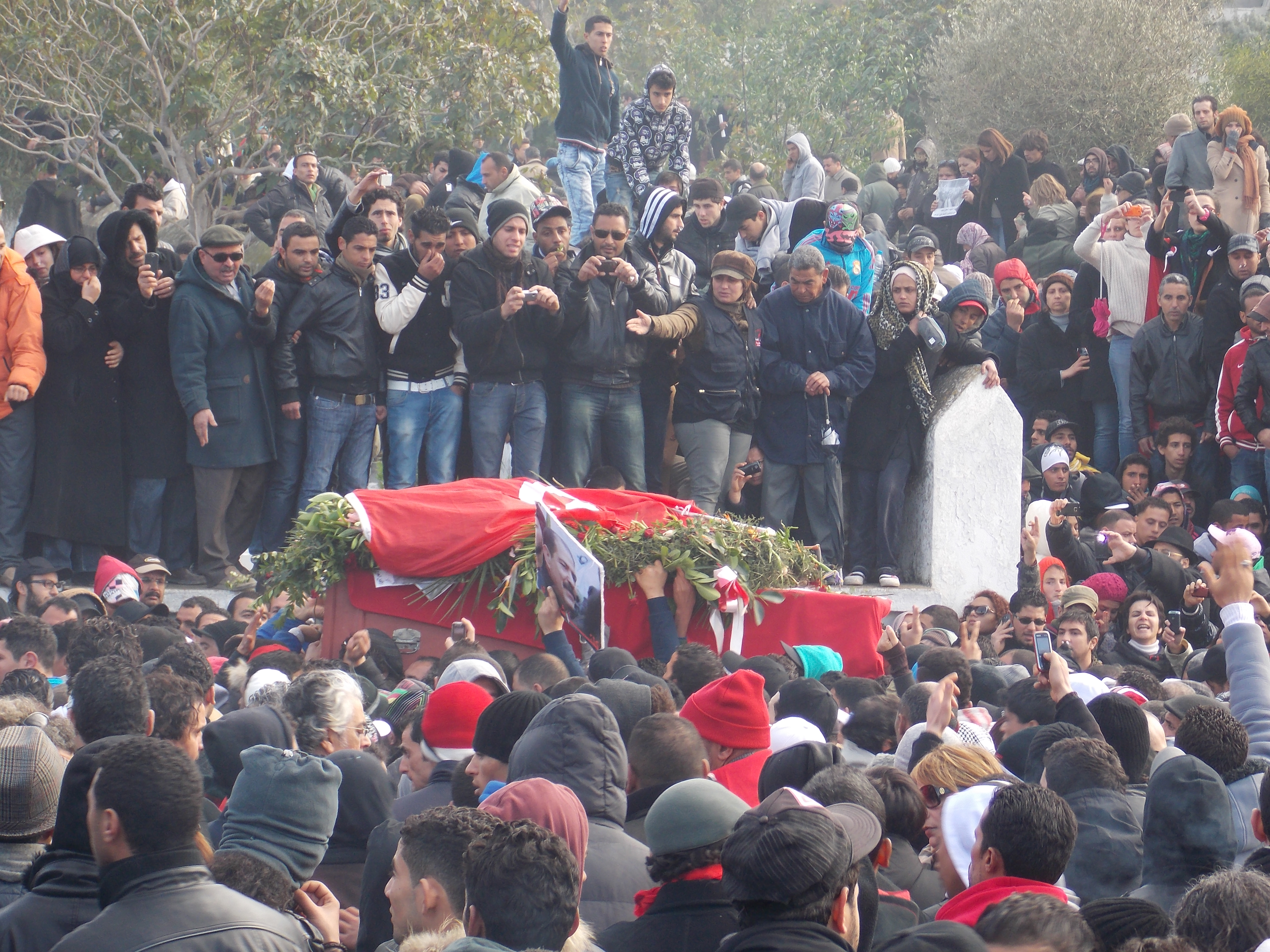
Funeral of Chokri Belaïd at the Jellaz Cemetery.

On 26 February, four radical Islamists were detained due to their alleged connections to the assassination of Belaid. The suspect in the murder was identified as Boubacar Hakim, a hardline Salafist, which was also carried out by Abū Sayyāf Kamāl Gafgāzī, Lutfī az-Zayn accompanied him, and Abū Zakariyyā Ahmad ar-Ruwaysī helped both in executing the operation.

On 2 October, Chokri Belaid defence committee spokesman Tayeb Oqaili claimed that, according to official documents, Abdulhakim Belhadj was involved in the killings of both Chokri Belaid and Mohamed Brahmi, pointing to links between the Libyan Islamic Fighting Group, Ansar al Sharia and the Ennahda Movement. The left-wing leader maintained that Belhadj apparently intended to carry out terrorist attacks in Tunisia, and trained the Ansar al-Sharia cell that killed the opposition politicians, all under close observation by Ennahda leaders Rashid al-Ghannushi, Hamadi Jebali and Samir Dilou, among others.

A total of 23 suspects were charged in the assassination. On 27 March 2024, a Tunisian court sentenced four suspects to death for their role in the murder and sentenced two others to life imprisonment. Five suspects were acquitted, while the rest received prison terms of varying length.

=== Reactions ===
Prime Minister Hamadi Jebali called the killing "a political assassination and the assassination of the Tunisian revolution." In a televised address, Jebali announced the formation of a caretaker government composed of technocrats, which would rule the country until a new election is held. The Islamist political party Ennahda issued a statement calling the attack a "heinous crime" that targeted the "security and stability of Tunisia". The premises of Ennahda in the central town of Mezzouna and in the north-eastern town of El Kef were torched by demonstrators and the party's office in Gafsa was ransacked. Four opposition parties, Belaid's own Popular Front bloc, Nidaa Tounes, the Al Massar party, and the Republican Party, announced that they were pulling out of the national assembly and called for a general strike.

International reactions included:

- Egypt – The ruling Muslim Brotherhood said that assassinations were a crime and must be stopped; while the National Salvation Front expressed its fear of similar political assassinations happening in Egypt.
- Germany – Foreign Minister Guido Westerwelle expressed his "horror" and "sadness."
- France – President François Hollande stated that "this murder robs Tunisia of one of its most courageous and free voices".
- United Kingdom – The Foreign Office released a statement condemning the killing and calling it a "cowardly and barbaric act aimed at destabilising Tunisia's democratic transition."
- United States – The spokesperson for the State Department, Victoria Nuland, condemned the killing and called it an "outrageous and cowardly act." She also called for a "fair, transparent and professional investigation to ensure that the perpetrators are brought to justice consistent with Tunisian law and international norms".

The assassination of Chokri Belaid prompted responses from the Tunisian intellectual community.

=== Funeral ===
Belaid's funeral service was held in Tunis on 8 February. It was attended by at least a million people amid clashes between police and protesters His body was buried at Jellaz cemetery. The following day en Nahda called for its supporters to gather in Tunis.

== See also ==
- Mohamed Brahmi
- Nahed Hattar
