= Hamma Hammami =

Tunisian politician

- حمّه الهمامي
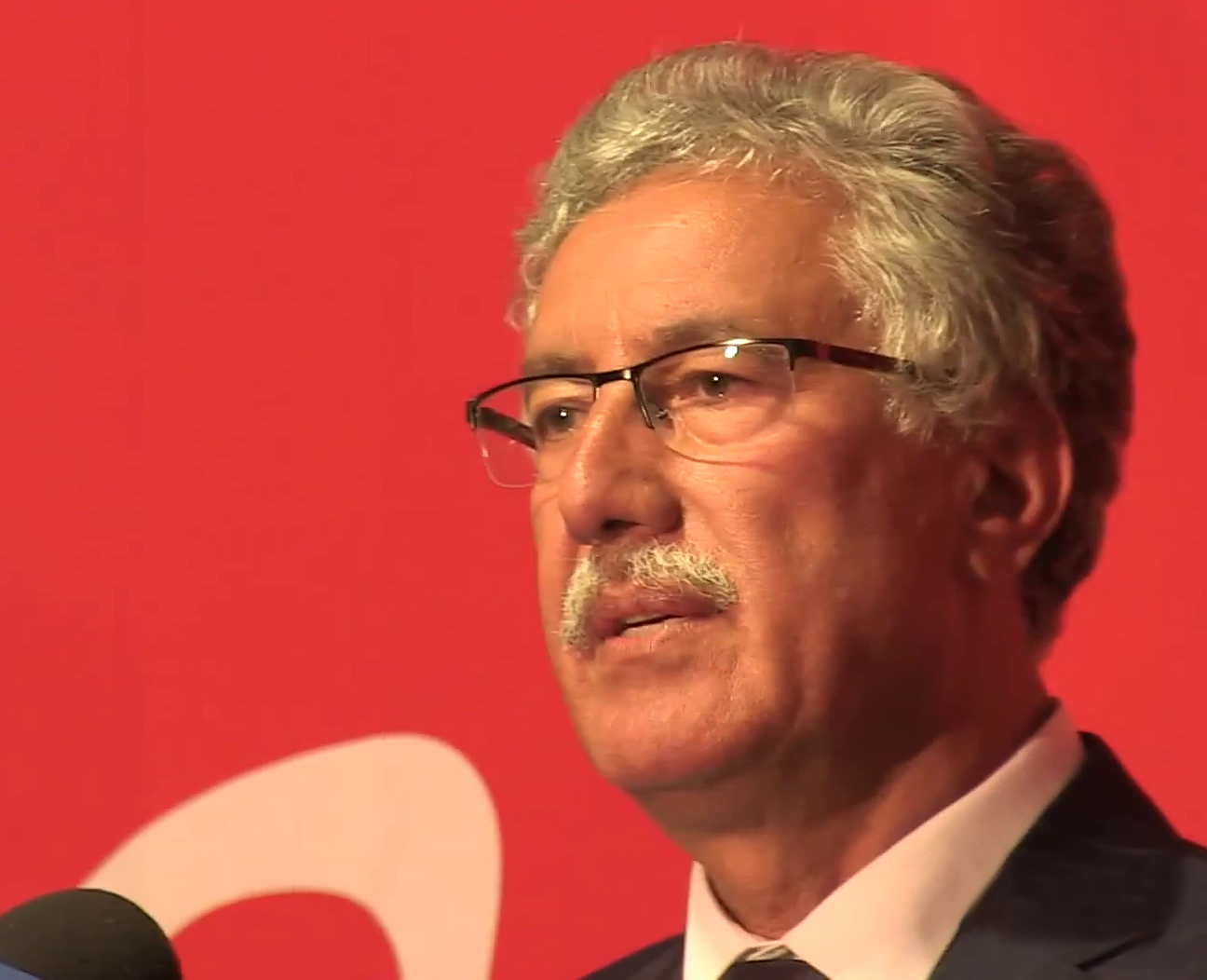

Personal details
- Born: 8 January 1952 (age 74) Tunis, Tunisia
- Party: Workers' Party
- Other political affiliations: Popular Front (2012–2019)
- Spouse: Radhia Nasraoui
- Children: 3 (Nadia, Oussaïma and Sarah)

Hamma Hammami (Arabic: حمّه الهمامي; born 8 January 1952) is a Tunisian communist, leader of the Popular Front, spokesman of the Tunisian Workers' Party, and former editor of the party news organ El-Badil.

== Activities ==
Hammami was imprisoned and tortured for his political activism against the rule of President Zine El Abidine Ben Ali and was noted for strong opposition to the government of Ben Ali.

On 12 January 2011, he was arrested at his home for speaking to journalists about the Tunisian revolution. He was subsequently released on 15 January by the interim government of Fouad Mebazaa.

== Personal life ==
Hamma Hammami was born on 8 January 1952 in El Aroussa, Tunisia. He is married to the human rights lawyer Radhia Nasraoui. Together they had three children, Nadia, Oussaïma and Sarah.

== Works ==
Hamma Hammami is the author of several political essays in Arabic language including:

- Against obscurantism, Tunis, 1985
- The perestroïka : An against-revolution, Tunis, 1988
- History of the labor movement in Tunisia, Tunis, 1988
- Tunisian society: social and economic study, Tunis, 1989
- About secularism, Tunis, 1990
- Tunisian women: present and future, Tunis, 1992
- The path of dignity, Paris, 2002
- Who judges whom?, Tunis, 2013
- Liberty or Tyranny?, Tunis, 2013
- Women and socialism today, Tunis, 2015
- About liberties and equalities, Tunis, 2019

== See also ==
- 18 October Coalition for Rights and Freedoms
- Official Facebook page
