= Mohamed Brahmi =

Tunisian politician

- محمد براهمي
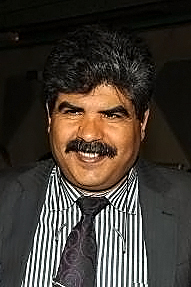

Member of the Constituent Assembly
- In office 22 November 2011 – 25 July 2013
- Succeeded by: Fadhel Saghraoui
- Constituency: Sidi Bouzid

Leader of the People's Movement
- In office 8 March 2011 – 7 July 2013
- Preceded by: Position created
- Succeeded by: Zouhair Maghzaoui

Personal details
- Born: 15 May 1955 Sidi Bouzid, Sidi Bouzid Governorate, Tunisia
- Died: 25 July 2013 (aged 58) Ariana, Tunisia
- Cause of death: Assassination
- Party: Independent
- Other political affiliations: People's Movement
- Spouse: Mbarka Aouinia Brahmi
- Children: five (four daughters and one son)
- Education: Tunis University

Mohamed Brahmi (Tunisian Arabic: محمد براهمي; 15 May 1955 – 25 July 2013) was a Tunisian politician. Brahmi was the founder and former leader of the People's Movement, which, under his leadership, won two seats in the constituent election in 2011.

== Early life and career ==
Brahmi was born on 15 May 1955 in Sidi Bouzid, capital of the Sidi Bouzid Governorate. He graduated from his alma mater, the Higher Institute of Management at Tunis University with a master's degree in accounting in 1982. After his graduation, he taught as a professor of economics and management for two years at the Technical College of Menzel Bourguiba.

Later, he worked in the Office of Irrigation, and then in real estate from 1985 to 1993. He did consultancy work as an auditor for the Technical Cooperation Agency in Saudi Arabia. From 2004, he worked as the manager of a real estate business specializing in residential properties.

== Politics ==
Brahmi was an active member of the Arab Progressive Unionist Students until 2005, at which point he left and founded the Nasserist Unionist Movement, an illegal party under the Ben Ali government. After the Tunisian revolution, he founded the People's Movement and became the general secretary of the group. The party later joined the Popular Front on 13 April 2013. However, Brahmi and other members of the movement left the front on 7 July due to criticisms of the movements' central and regional leaders over cooperation with the front.

Brahmi was known for his socialist and Arab nationalist beliefs, particularly in the tradition of Gamal Abdel Nasser. He was a practicing Muslim. Although a member of the anti-Islamist Popular Front, he did not have a reputation for being especially critical of Islamists, and in fact had many friends in the ruling Islamist Ennahda Movement.

== Assassination and funeral ==
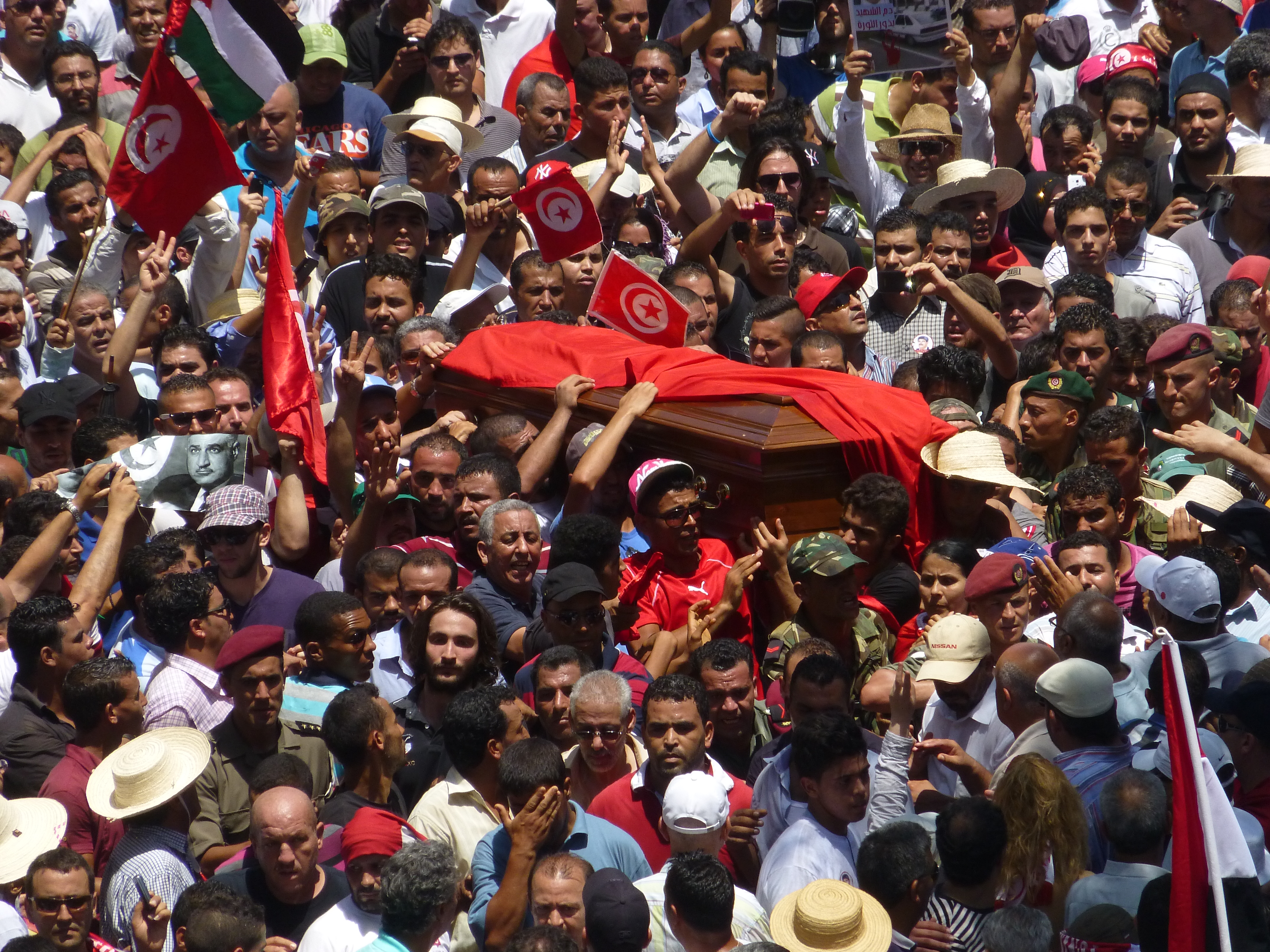
Brahmi's funeral procession

On 25 July 2013, Brahmi was fatally shot in Tunis outside his Ariana home in front of his wife and children by two men on a motorcycle. He received 11 bullets and died later that day in a hospital in Ariana district of Tunis.

Brahmi's death followed the assassination of opposition leader Chokri Belaid, killed on 6 February 2013. The two were members of the same left-wing coalition. Interior Minister Lotfi Ben Jeddou told a news conference: "The same 9mm automatic weapon that killed Belaid also killed Brahmi." The suspect in both murders was identified as Abū Muqātil at-Tūnusī, a Salafist being sought on suspicion of smuggling weapons from Libya.

A state funeral was held for Brahmi and tens of thousands of people attended the procession to the Jellaz Cemetery in Tunis. During Brahmi's funeral, protesters called for the government to be toppled, while police fired tear gas on them.

=== Protest ===
Following his death, hundreds of his supporters, including relatives and party members of the People's Movement, demonstrated in front of the Interior Ministry's building on Avenue Habib Bourguiba and blamed the incumbent Ennahda Party and their followers for the assassination. Hundreds of supporters also protested in Brahmi's hometown of Sidi Bouzid.

After the protests, Education Minister Salem Labiadh submitted his resignation. The opposition minority in the national assembly called for the government to resign and dissolve the legislature, but Prime Minister Ali Larayedh said that the government would continue its work and set 17 December as the date for the scheduled general election (later postponed for the end of 2014). In January 2014, however, Ennahda replaced Larayedh with a technocrat.

=== Legacy ===
On 19 September 2013, Tunisia's interior minister told lawmakers the CIA informed authorities Brahmi was a target and said there had been a "failure" in the security services' response. He announced an investigation had been opened.

In the 2014 election, his wife Mbarka Aouinia Brahmi, heading the Popular Front's list in the Sidi Bouzid constituency, was elected a member of the Assembly of the Representatives of the People. On 4 December 2014, she was nominated for the post of the First deputy Speaker of the Assembly by the Popular Front, but was defeated with 33 votes against 157 votes for her contender Abdelfattah Mourou of Ennahda. Apart from the Popular Front (15 seats), only Afek Tounes (8 seats) had declared their support for her. She later claimed that Nidaa Tounes and Ennahda had had a pact to share the positions of president and vice-president of the Assembly, saying "the two parties of the political right, the one liberal and the other religious, joined hands under the table".
