= Tunisian Ba'ath Movement =

Tunisian political party

Tunisian Ba'ath Movement حركة البعث التونسي Mouvement Baath tunisien
- Leader: Omar Othman Belhadj
- Founded: 1988
- Ideology: Ba'athism; Saddamism
- National affiliation: Popular Front
- International affiliation: Ba'ath Party (Iraqi-dominated faction)

Party flag

Website
- albaath-tunisie.com (Link dead) Wayback Machine (2015)

The Tunisian Ba'ath Movement (Arabic: حركة البعث التونسي Hereket El-Ba'ath Et-Tunsi; French: Mouvement Baath tunisien) is a political party in Tunisia. It is the Tunisian regional branch of the Iraqi-led Ba'ath Party.

== History ==
The first Ba'athist branch in Tunisia, then under the unified Ba'ath Party, was established in 1955; however, the Ba'ath Party was outlawed under Zine El Abidine Ben Ali. Following the Tunisian Revolution, the Tunisian Ba'ath Movement was established at its First Congress on 3–5 June 2011 and legally registered on 22 January 2011. However, Ba'athists have been active in underground politics since the 1950s. The Ba'ath Movement marked the fifth anniversary of the death of Saddam Hussein. Omar Othman Belhadj, Secretary-General of the Executive Committee of the Ba'ath Movement, said "Hussein's execution was symbolic, they did not kill a person but rather the ideas he represented and fought for. Hussein was killed for being against colonization and for being a defender of Arab unity and independence of Arab countries." He further noted that he did not support killing Muammar Gaddafi, saying that Gaddafi had a right to a fair trial like anyone else.

Omar once told a journalist, "the Syrian regime has turned against the Ba'ath and is no longer Ba'athist one". The party does not support Syria's expulsion from the Arab League, and asserts that foreign nations should play a neutral role in the Syrian Civil War. On 4 February 2012, the Executive Committee of the Ba'ath Movement released a communiqué condemning the provisional Tunisian government's expulsion of the Syrian ambassador. The Ba'ath Movement expressed solidarity with the Syrian protesters, and condemned the shooting of unarmed demonstrators. The committee predicted that the Syrian ambassador's expulsion would militarise the conflict, mobilising Arab opinion against the government and leading to military intervention. After the revolution, the Arab Democratic Vanguard Party emerged as second "Iraqi" Baathist Party in Tunisia. Its membership is younger and its political position more at the left of the Baath Movement. It's headed by Kheireddine Souabni and Ahmed Seddik. Both parties are members of the Popular Front, a communist-dominated front.
