= Union for Tunisia =

Union for Tunisia الاتحاد من أجل تونس
- Founded: 11 February 2013
- Ideology: Secularism
- Parties: Social Democratic Path; Patriotic and Democratic Labour Party; Socialist Party
- Assembly of the Representatives of the People: 0 / 217

The Union for Tunisia (Tunisian Arabic: الاتحاد من أجل تونس, French: Union pour la Tunisie) is a secularist electoral alliance in Tunisia, formed on 11 February 2013 to run in the October 2014 legislative election. Originally, it consisted of five political parties, only three of which are still part of it ahead of the election. The Republican Party, which was an original member, withdrew from the coalition on 30 December 2013. In May 2014, Nidaa Tounes announced that it would run on separate lists as well.

== Affiliated parties ==
- Social Democratic Path (al-Massar)
- Patriotic and Democratic Labour Party (PTPD)
- Socialist Party (PS)
