= Sidi Bouzid =

Sidi Bouzid سيدي بوزيد
- City
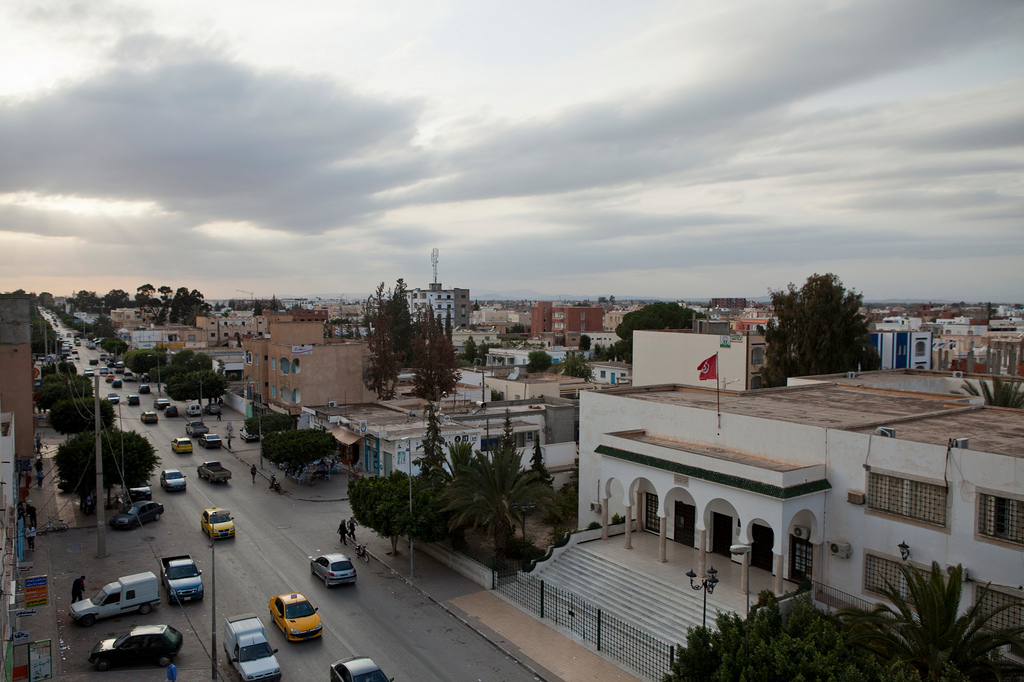
- View of Sidi Bouzid

- Location in Tunisia
- Coordinates: 35°02′17″N 09°29′09″E
- Country: Tunisia
- Governorate: Sidi Bouzid Governorate
- Delegation(s): Sidi Bouzid East, Sidi Bouzid West

Government
  - Mayor: Vacant

Population (2022)
  - Total: 52,339
- Time zone: UTC+1 (CET)

Sidi Bouzid (Arabic: سيدي بوزيد Sīdi Bu Zīd), sometimes called Sidi Bou Zid or Sīdī Bū Zayd, is a city in Tunisia and is the capital of Sidi Bouzid Governorate in the centre of the country. Following the suicide of Mohamed Bouazizi in Sidi Bouzid, it was the site of the first clashes of the Tunisian Revolution and a catalyst for other protests in the region, often known as the Arab Spring.

== History ==
=== Antiquity ===
Ruins at Henchir-Simindja, Bou-Zid have been identified with the Roman era town of Simingi. Simingi was a civitas of the Roman province of Africa Proconsularis. Roman era Simingi was also the seat of an ancient bishopric, suffragan of the Archdiocese of Carthage.

=== World War II ===
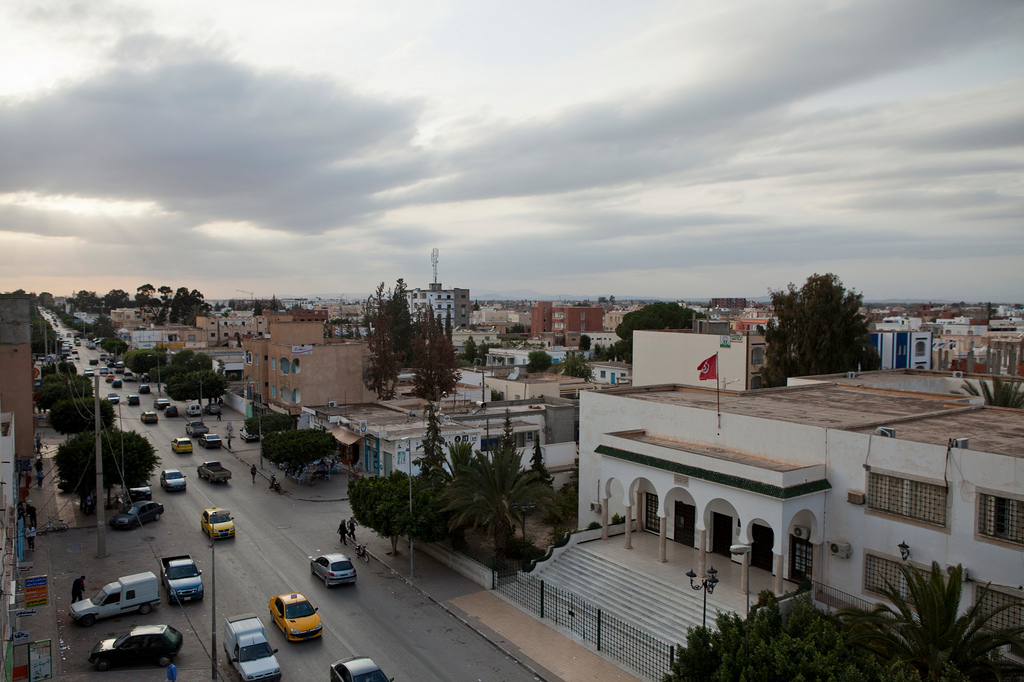
View of Sidi Bouzid, Tunisia

It was the site of a battle which took place in February 1943, part of the Tunisian Campaign of World War II. This battle began on 14 February 1943 at nearby Faid Pass when the German 10th and 21st Panzer Divisions attacked elements of the US 1st Armored Division and 168th Infantry. This Battle of Sidi Bou Zid was the opening act in what became known as the Battle of Kasserine Pass.

=== Role in the Tunisian revolution ===
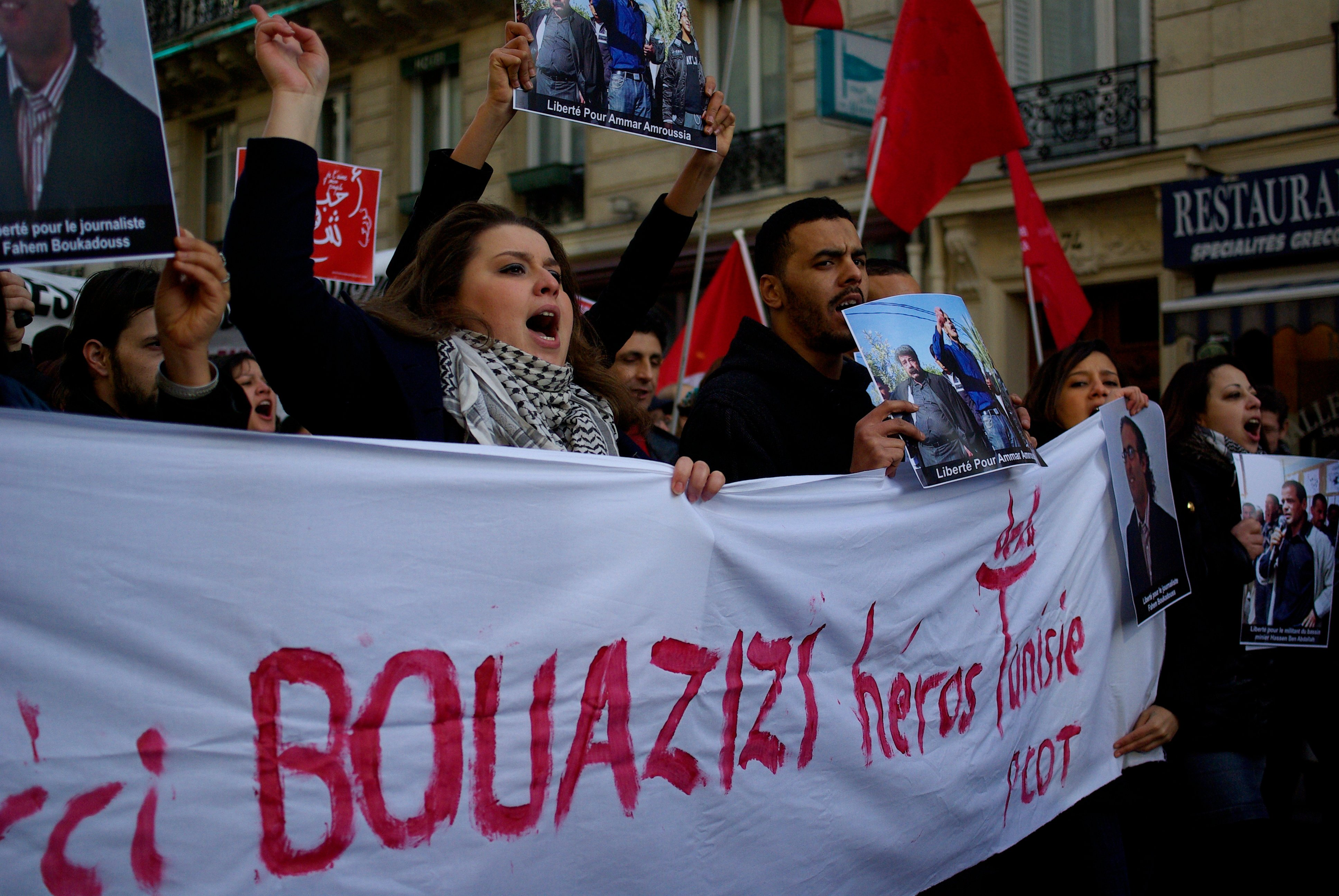
Political protest in France inspired by Bouazizi

On 17 December 2010, clashes occurred in Sidi Bouzid between residents and the police following the public suicide of Mohamed Bouazizi. Bouazizi worked as one of the city's street Named ( Rahba ) vendors selling fruit. He set fire to himself on 17 December as protest against the authorities' seizure of his goods, after an alleged refusal to pay a bribe to officials, and the police harassment and violence he suffered as a result. He died of his injuries on 4 January 2011.

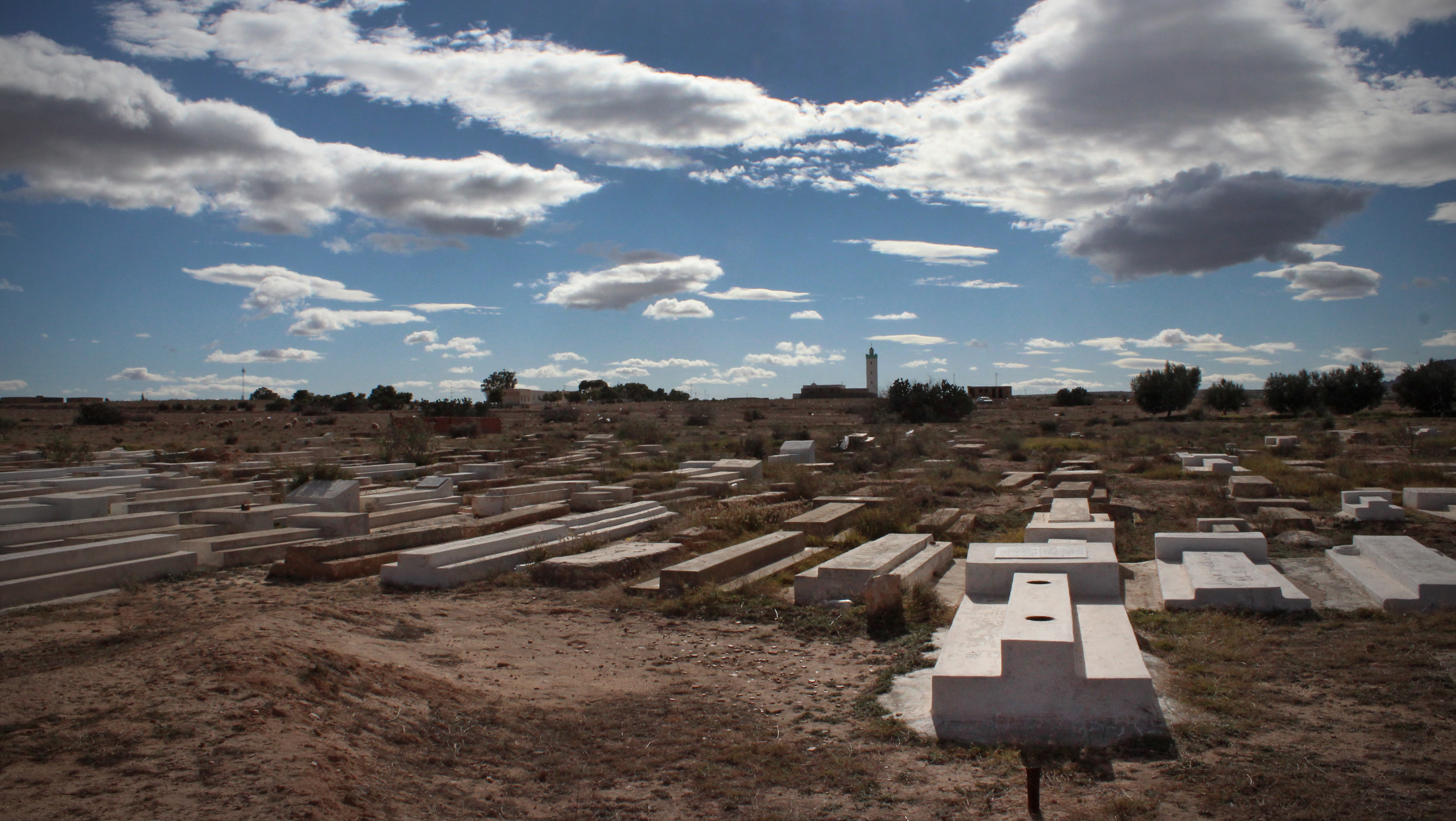
Mohamed Bouazizi's grave and tombstone

In early January 2011, more clashes with the police in Sidi Bouzid led to at least 20 deaths. Protesters in Sidi Bouzid began taking pictures, but most importantly video clips, of these events and the violence meted out to them (including firing live rounds) using 'smart phones' and other mobile devices. They were then posted extensively on the web using social media sites. As a direct result, violent protests soon spread through the country, eventually reaching the capital of Tunis. As the uprising intensified, President Ben Ali fled the country on 14 January 2011.

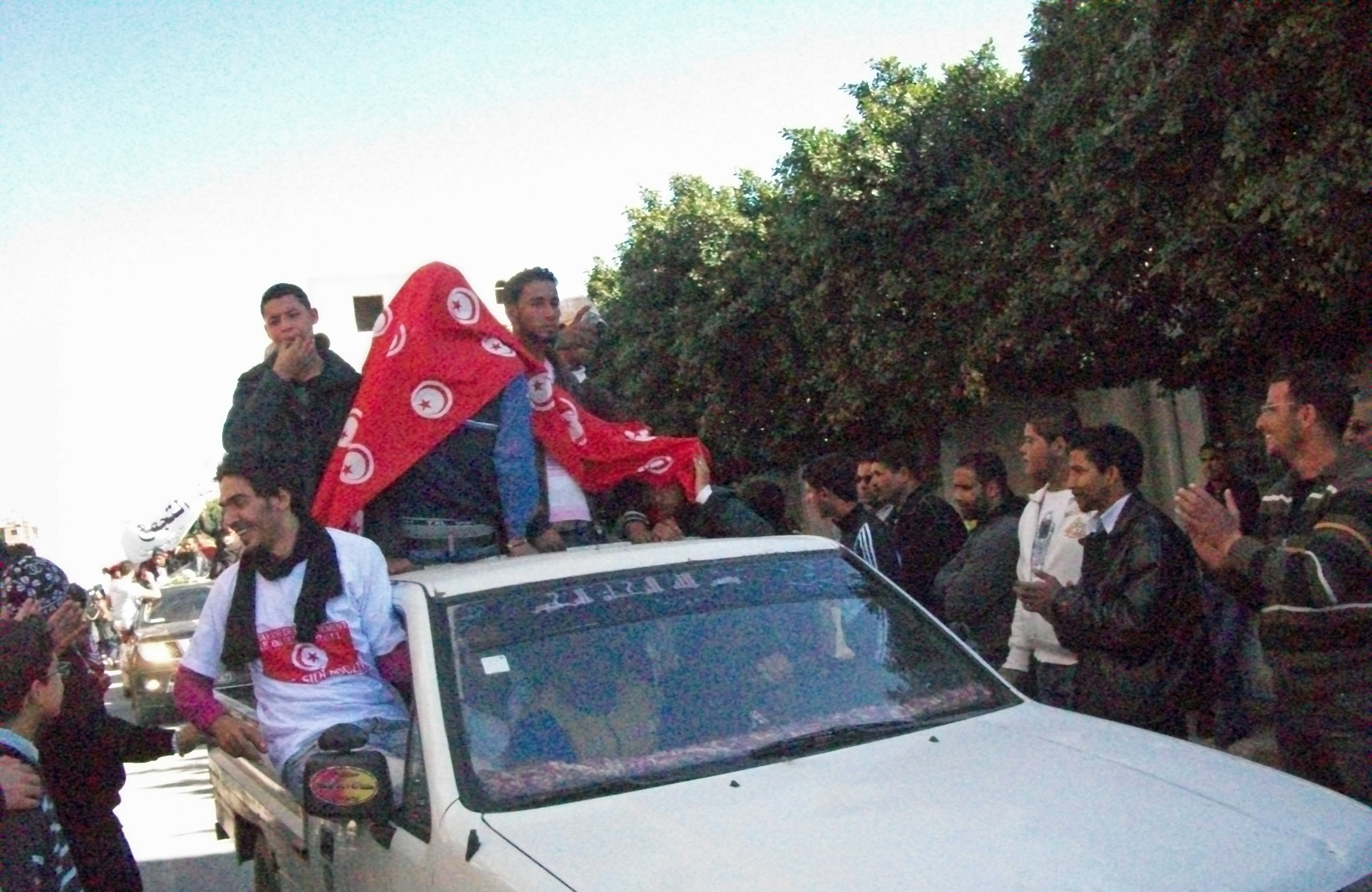
Sidi Bouzid la ville à l'origine de la révolution en Tunisie)

The success of protesters from Sidi Bouzid in publicizing their efforts and plight via social media has been seen as the most distinctive and decisive feature in facilitating the following uprisings across North Africa and other Arab nations.

=== 'Secession' from Tunisia ===
In late July, 2013, officials declared that their city had seceded from Tunisia and would not return to control of the central government unless Islamist government led by Ennahda party was removed from power.

== Climate ==
Sidi Bouzid has a borderline hot semi-arid / hot desert climate (BSh/BWh) according to the Köppen climate classification.

Climate data for Sidi Bouzid (1991–2020, extremes 1960–2021)
Month	Jan	Feb	Mar	Apr	May	Jun	Jul	Aug	Sep	Oct	Nov	Dec	Year
Record high °C (°F)	27.2 (81.0)	33.2 (91.8)	36.1 (97.0)	36.7 (98.1)	43.0 (109.4)	45.7 (114.3)	46.5 (115.7)	47.4 (117.3)	41.3 (106.3)	39.9 (103.8)	33.5 (92.3)	29.6 (85.3)	47.4 (117.3)
Mean daily maximum °C (°F)	16.3 (61.3)	17.3 (63.1)	20.5 (68.9)	24.1 (75.4)	29.0 (84.2)	34.0 (93.2)	37.5 (99.5)	37.0 (98.6)	31.8 (89.2)	27.2 (81.0)	21.3 (70.3)	17.1 (62.8)	26.1 (79.0)
Daily mean °C (°F)	10.7 (51.3)	11.5 (52.7)	14.2 (57.6)	17.4 (63.3)	21.6 (70.9)	26.0 (78.8)	29.0 (84.2)	29.0 (84.2)	25.3 (77.5)	21.1 (70.0)	15.6 (60.1)	11.8 (53.2)	19.4 (67.0)
Mean daily minimum °C (°F)	5.2 (41.4)	5.7 (42.3)	7.9 (46.2)	10.6 (51.1)	14.2 (57.6)	17.9 (64.2)	20.6 (69.1)	21.1 (70.0)	18.9 (66.0)	15.0 (59.0)	9.9 (49.8)	6.5 (43.7)	12.8 (55.0)
Record low °C (°F)	−4.5 (23.9)	−6.0 (21.2)	−2.5 (27.5)	0.5 (32.9)	4.4 (39.9)	8.5 (47.3)	10.6 (51.1)	11.0 (51.8)	10.2 (50.4)	3.0 (37.4)	−0.3 (31.5)	−4.0 (24.8)	−6.0 (21.2)
Average precipitation mm (inches)	23.0 (0.91)	19.8 (0.78)	23.3 (0.92)	27.1 (1.07)	22.7 (0.89)	12.6 (0.50)	8.1 (0.32)	17.1 (0.67)	40.5 (1.59)	19.0 (0.75)	20.6 (0.81)	15.9 (0.63)	249.8 (9.83)
Average precipitation days (≥ 1.0 mm)	2.9	2.6	3.8	3.4	3.1	1.8	1.1	2.3	4.4	3.3	2.8	2.8	34.2
Average relative humidity (%)	64	62	62	60	57	52	47	53	60	66	66	65	60
Mean monthly sunshine hours	196.9	199.1	229.5	245.2	293.0	315.7	349.5	318.5	249.6	225.4	201.1	191.8	3,015.3
Source 1: Institut National de la Météorologie (humidity 1961-1990, sun 1981–2010) (Note: The Station ID for Sidi Bouzid is 44848111.)
Source 2: NOAA

== Sports ==
The city is represented by the Étoile Olympique de Sidi Bouzid in the Tunisian football competitions. It played in the national Tunisian football league for the first time in 2016 and after 2 years it return to the second division.
