= Workers' Party (Tunisia) =

- Leader: Hamma Hammami
- Founded: 3 January 1986
- Legalized: 18 March 2011
- Newspaper: Al Badil
- Ideology: Communism; Marxism–Leninism; Hoxhaism; Pan-Arabism
- Political position: Left-wing to far-left
- National affiliation: Popular Front (2013–2019)
- International affiliation: ICMLPO(US); IPA

The Workers' Party (Arabic: حزب العمال, romanized: Ḥizb el-'Ummēl; French: Parti des travailleurs) is a Marxist-Leninist party in Tunisia. Legalized only in 2011, it participates in the Popular Front coalition, which is represented in the Assembly of the Representatives of the People. The party's long-term leader is general secretary Hamma Hammami.

Founded in 1986, the party was known as the Tunisian Workers' Communist Party (Arabic: حزب العمال الشيوعي التونسي, romanized: Ḥizb el-'Ummēl esh-Shuyū'ī et-Tūnsī; French: Parti communiste des ouvriers de Tunisie, PCOT) until 2012. After the rename it remained a member of the Hoxhaist International Conference of Marxist–Leninist Parties and Organizations (Unity & Struggle).

== History ==
The party was outlawed until the Tunisian Revolution, when in a failed attempt to shore up the state framework it and another banned parties were invited to participate in a national unity government. Subsequently, the party and other opposition elements refused this attempt to co-opt the ongoing revolution by installing a government composed at its senior levels by associates of the former regime.

It was founded on 3 January 1986 and has a youth wing the Union of Communist Youth of Tunisia (UJCT).

Amnesty International reports that in 1998 five students were charged with belonging to PCOT and given 4-year prison sentences after student demonstrations.

After their involvement in the uprising against Zine El Abidine Ben Ali, PCOT held their first conference as a legal party on 22–24 July, with up to 2000 attending. Removing the word "communist" from the party's name was among the topics debated. In the end, party spokesperson Abed Jabbar Bdouri stated the party decided "not to make any changes since we're currently too busy with the electoral campaign".

In the 2011 Constituent Assembly election, the candidates of PCOT's electoral formation ran by the name "Revolutionary Alternative" (Arabic: البديل الثوري el-bedīl es-sewrī; French: Alternative révolutionaire) and won 3 of the 217 seats, in Sfax, Kairouan and Siliana. Member Chrif Khraief has stated the party was dissatisfied with the result, as "3 seats in the CA doesn't reflect at all the real weight of the party on the streets"; PCOT issued a statement condemning the use of political donations and electoral violations during the campaign.

In July 2012, the PCOT decided to remove the word "communist" from its name to avoid the stereotype associated with this term.

== See also ==
- List of anti-revisionist groups
