= Laarayedh Cabinet =

- Cabinet of Tunisia

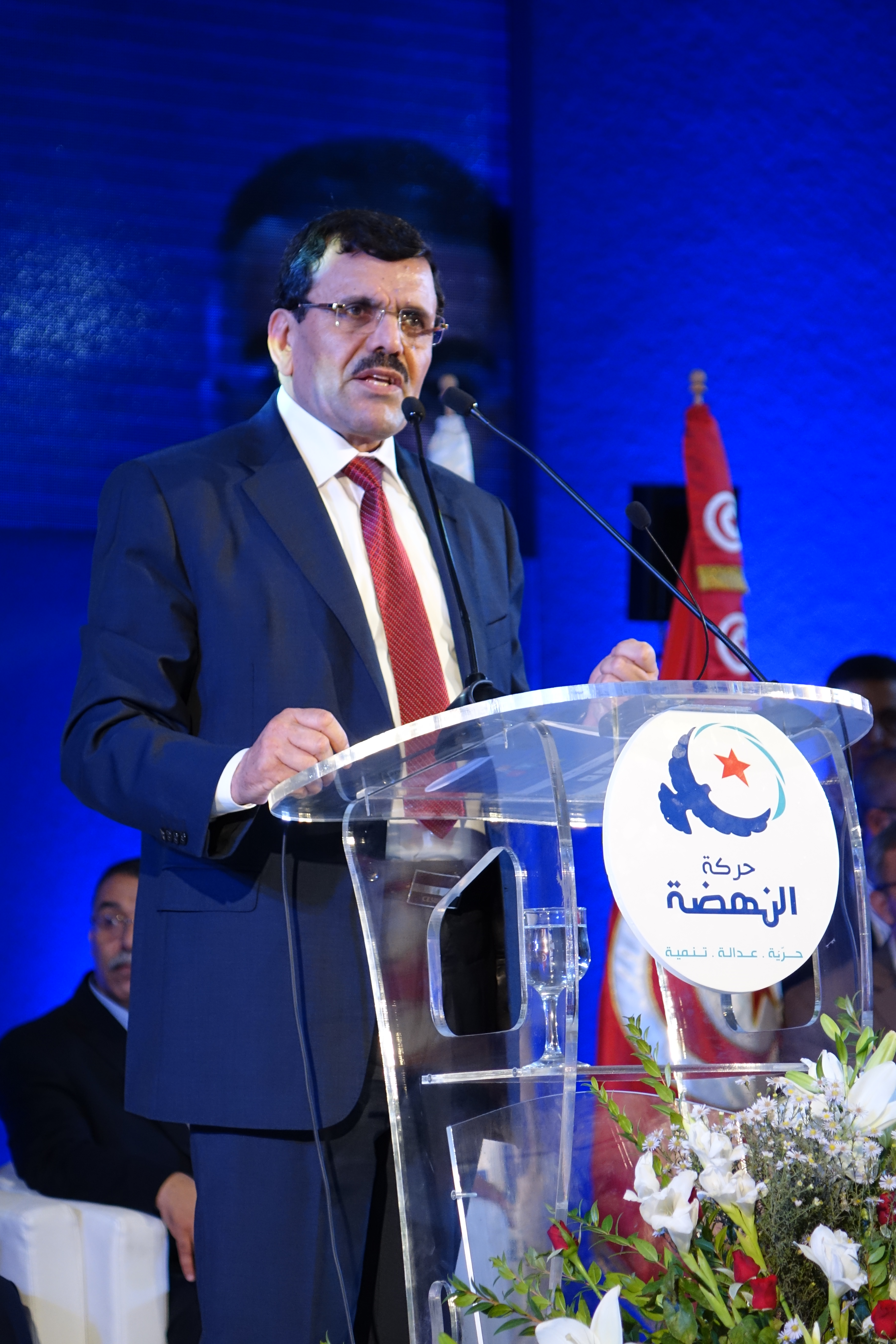
- Date formed: 13 March 2013
- Date dissolved: 29 January 2014 (10 months and 16 days)

People and organisations
- Head of state: Moncef Marzouki (CPR)
- Head of government: Ali Laarayedh (Ennahda)
- Total no. of members: 38 (incl. Prime Minister)
- Member parties: Ennahda, Ettakatol, CPR ("Troika")
- Status in legislature: coalition government
- Opposition parties: Nidaa Tounes, People's Movement, Popular Front, Al Joumhouri

History
- Election: 2011 Constituent Assembly election
- Legislature term: Constituent Assembly (2011–2014)
- Predecessor: Jebali Cabinet (2011–13)
- Successor: Jomaa Cabinet (2014-15)

The first cabinet of Tunisian Head of Government Ali Laarayedh was presented on 8 March 2013. It was approved on 13 March 2013 by the Constituent Assembly of Tunisia. Laarayedh resigned on 9 January 2014. His successor, Mehdi Jomaa, took office on 29 January 2014.

== Cabinet members ==
The Laarayedh government consisted of the Prime Minister, three deputy prime ministers, 24 ministers and six state secretaries.

Office	Name	Party
Head of Government	Ali Laarayedh	Ennahda
Deputy Prime Minister	Noureddine Bhiri	Ennahda
Deputy Prime Minister for Economy	Ridha Saidi	Ennahda
Deputy Prime Minister for Governance and Fighting Corruption	Abderrahman Ladgham	Ettakatol
Minister of Defence	Rachid Sabbagh	Independent
Minister of Interior	Lotfi Ben Jeddou	Independent
Minister of Foreign Affairs	Othman Jerandi	Independent
Minister of Justice	Nadhir Ben Ammou	Independent
Minister of Human Rights, Transitional Justice and Government Spokesperson	Samir Dilou	Ennahda
Minister of Religious Affairs	Nourredine Khadmi	Independent
Minister of Finance	Elyes Fakhfakh	Ettakatol
Minister of Industry	Mehdi Jomaa	Independent
Minister of Commerce and Craft industry	Abdelwaheb Maatar	CPR
Minister of Tourism	Jamel Gamra	Independent
Minister of Social Affairs	Khalil Zaouia	Ettakatol
Minister of Education	Salem Labiadh	Independent
Minister of Health	Abdellatif Mekki	Ennahda
Minister of Development and International Cooperation	Lamine Doghri	Independent
Minister of Vocational Training and Employment	Naoufel Jammali	Independent
Minister of Transport	Abdelkarim Harouni	Ennahda
Minister of Communication Technologies	Mongi Marzouk	Ennahda
Minister of Equipment and Environment	Mohamed Salmane	Ennahda
Minister of Youth and Sports	Tarak Dhiab	Independent
Minister of Culture	Mehdi Mabrouk	Independent
Minister of Women’s Affairs	Sihem Badi	CPR
Minister of Higher Education and Scientific Research	Moncef Ben Salem	Ennahda
Minister of State Domains and Land Affairs	Slim Ben Hamidene	CPR
Minister of Agriculture	Mohamed Ben Salem	Ennahda
Secretary of State for Regional Affairs and Local Authorities	Saïd Mechichi	Ettakatol
Secretary of State for African and Arab Affairs	Leila Bahria	Independent
Secretary of State for Immigration	Houcine Jaziri	Ennahda
Secretary of State for Finance	Chedly Abed	Independent
Secretary of State for Energy and Mines	Nidhal Ouerfelli	Independent
Secretary of State for Agriculture	Habib Jemli	Independent
Secretary of State for Regional Development	Noureddine Kaâbi	Independent
Secretary of State for Youth and Sports	Fethi Touzri	Independent
Secretary of State for Environment	Sadok Amri	Independent
Secretary of State for Housing	Chahida Ben Fraj Bouraoui	Independent
