= Jebali Cabinet =

- Cabinet of Tunisia

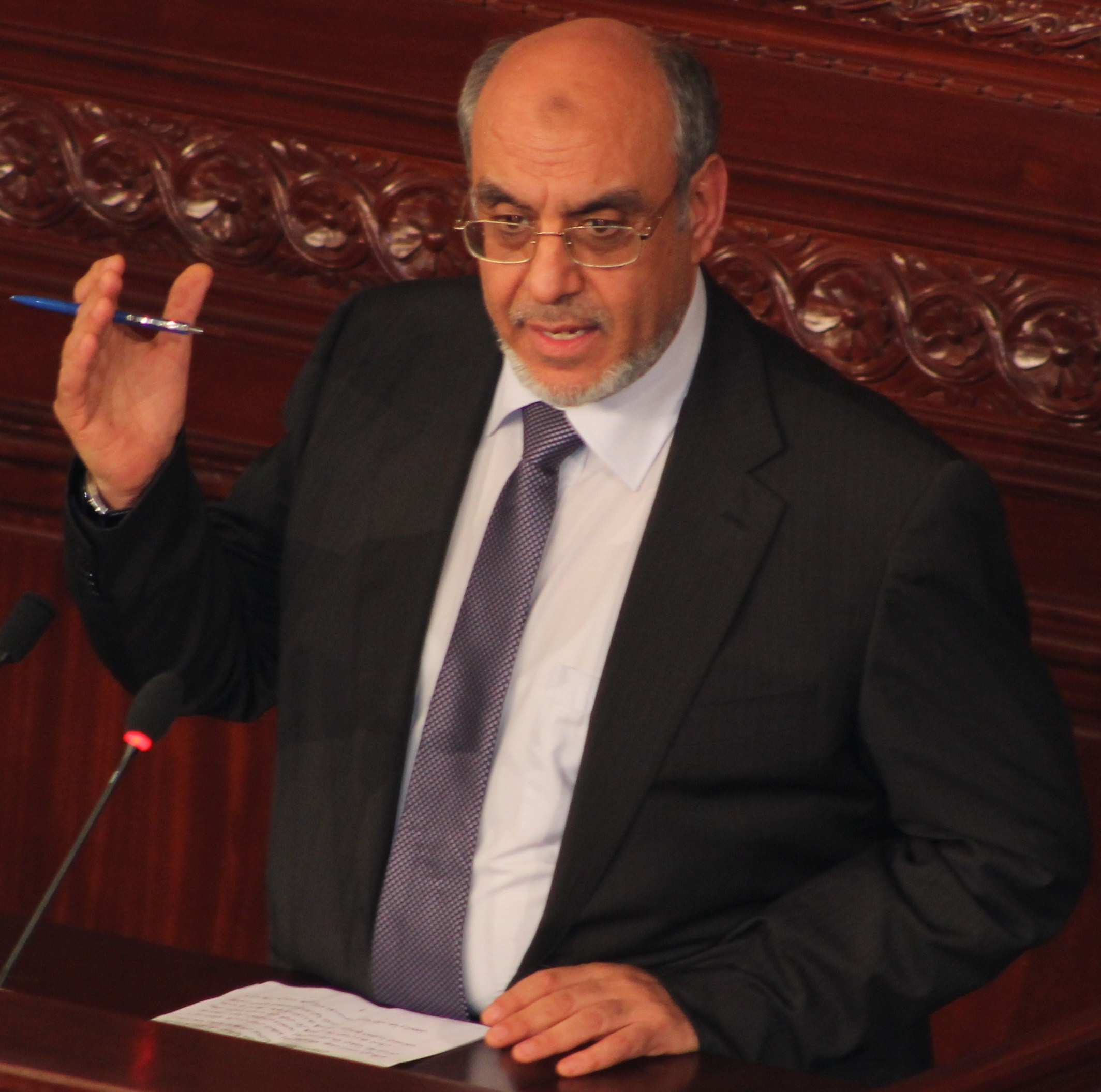
- Date formed: 24 December 2011
- Date dissolved: 13 March 2013 (1 year, 2 months and 17 days)

People and organisations
- Head of state: Moncef Marzouki (CPR)
- Head of government: Hamadi Jebali (Ennahda)
- Total no. of members: 42 (incl. Prime Minister)
- Member parties: Ennahda, Ettakatol, CPR ("Troika")
- Status in legislature: coalition government
- Opposition parties: Progressive Democratic Party, Workers Party, People's Movement

History
- Election: 2011 Constituent Assembly election
- Legislature term: Constituent Assembly (2011–2014)
- Predecessor: Caid Essebsi Cabinet (2011)
- Successor: Laarayedh Cabinet (2013–14)

The first cabinet of Tunisian Head of Government Hamadi Jebali was presented on 20 December 2011. Jebali has been appointed by interim President Moncef Marzouki, who had been elected by the National Constituent Assembly, a body constituted to draft a new constitution after the Tunisian Revolution and the fall of former President Zine El Abidine Ben Ali in Spring 2011. It took office on 24 December 2011. The three parties in the "Troika" coalition are the Islamist Ennahda Movement, the centre-left secularist Congress for the Republic (CPR), and the social democratic Democratic Forum for Labour and Liberties (Ettakatol).

== Cabinet members ==
The Jebali government consisted of the Prime Minister, four deputy prime ministers, 30 ministers and 11 state secretaries.

Office	Name	Party
Head of Government	Hamadi Jebali	Ennahda
Deputy Prime Minister for Transparency and Fighting Corruption	Abderrahman Ladgham	Ettakatol
Deputy Prime Minister for Administrative Reform	Mohamed Abbou	CPR
Deputy Prime Minister for Economy	Ridha Saidi	Ennahda
Deputy Prime Minister for Relations with the Constituent Assembly	Abderrazak Kilani	Independent
Minister of Defence	Abdelkarim Zbidi	Independent
Minister of Justice	Noureddine Bhiri	Ennahda
Minister of Interior	Ali Laarayedh	Ennahda
Minister of Foreign Affairs	Rafik Abdessalem	Ennahda
Minister of Religious Affairs	Nourredine Khadmi	Independent
Minister of Human Rights and Transitional Justice and Spokesperson of the Government	Samir Dilou	Ennahda
Minister of Tourism	Elyes Fakhfakh	Ettakatol
Minister of Education	Abdellatif Abid	Ettakatol
Minister of Health	Abdellatif Mekki	Ennahda
Minister of Vocational Training and Employment	Abdelwaheb Maatar	CPR
Minister of Transport	Abdelkarim Harouni	Ennahda
Minister of Communication Technologies	Mongi Marzouk	Ennahda
Minister of Industry and Commerce	Mohamed Lamine Chakhari	Ennahda
Minister of Investment and International Cooperation	Riadh Bettaieb	Ennahda
Minister of Equipment and Housing	Mohamed Salmane	Ennahda
Minister of Finance	Houcine Dimassi	Independent
Minister of Planning and Regional Development	Jamel Eddine Gharbi	Ennahda
Minister of Youth and Sports	Tarak Dhiab	Independent
Minister of Culture	Mehdi Mabrouk	Independent
Minister of Women’s Affairs	Sihem Badi	CPR
Minister of Higher Education and Scientific Research	Moncef Ben Salem	Ennahda
Minister of Social Affairs	Khalil Zaouia	Ettakatol
Minister of State Property and Real Estate Affairs	Salim Ben Hamidane	CPR
Minister of Agriculture	Mohamed Ben Salem	Ennahda
Minister of Environment	Memia Benna	Independent
Minister in charge of Commerce and Handicrafts	Béchir Zaâfouri	Independent
Secretary of State for Reform	Saïd Mechichi	Ettakatol
Secretary of State for African and Arab Affairs	Abdallah Triki	Independent
Secretary of State for American and Asian Affairs	Hédi Ben Abbès	CPR
Secretary of State for European Affairs	Touhami Abdouli	Ettakatol
State Secretary for Finance	Slim Besbes	Independent
Secretary of State for Immigration	Houcine Jaziri	Ennahda
Secretary of State for Investment and International Cooperation	Aleya Bettaïb	Independent
Secretary of State for Housing	Chahida Ben Fraj Bouraoui	Independent
State Secretary for Regional Development and Planning	Lamine Doghri	Independent
Secretary of State for Youth and Sports	Hichem Ben Jemaa	CPR
Secretary of State for Agriculture	Habib Jemli	Independent
