= Mehdi Jomaa =

Tunisian engineer (born 1962)

His Excellency Mehdi Jomaa
- مهدي جمعة
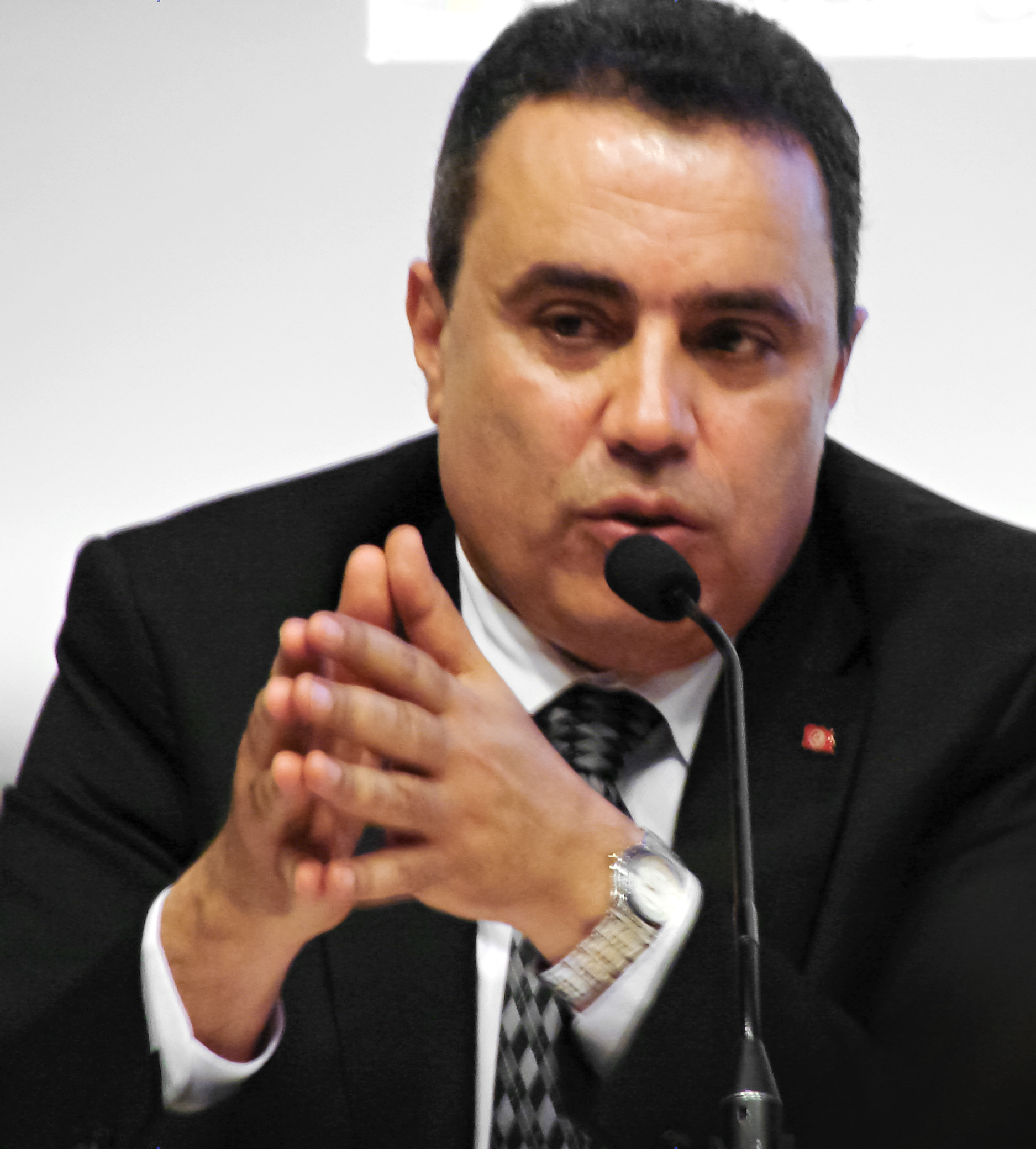
- Jomaa in 2013

Prime Minister of Tunisia
- In office 29 January 2014 – 6 February 2015
- President: Moncef Marzouki; Beji Caid Essebsi
- Preceded by: Ali Laarayedh
- Succeeded by: Habib Essid

Minister of Industry
- In office 14 March 2013 – 29 January 2014
- Prime Minister: Ali Laarayedh
- Preceded by: Mohamed Lamine Chakhari
- Succeeded by: Kamel Ben Naceur

Personal details
- Born: 21 April 1962 (age 64) Mahdia, Tunisia
- Party: Tunisian Alternative (since 2017)
- Education: Tunis El Manar University

Mehdi Jomaa (Arabic: مهدي جمعة; born 21 April 1962) is a Tunisian engineer and was the acting Prime Minister of Tunisia from 29 January 2014 to 6 February 2015. He was chosen on 14 December 2013. Jomaa was Minister of Industry in the Ali Laarayedh government.

== Early life ==
He was born on 21 April 1962 in Mahdia, Tunisia. He graduated from the National Engineering School, Tunis in 1998. He is an engineer by profession. He also holds a postgraduate degree in structural mechanics and in modeling. He spent most of his career at Hutchinson and at Total. He is married and has five children. He was a general manager at Hutchinson Aerospace when he quit his job.

== Political life ==
After Hamadi Jebali asked him to be part of his government, he quit his professional career to contribute to the country's transition into democracy after the crackdown of Zine El Abidine Ben Ali government in the 2011 uprising. He did not belong to any political party; he was an Independent. On 13 March 2013, he became Minister of Industry in a coalition government led by Ennahda after Ali Laarayedh appealed him to be part of his government. After the assassination of Mohamed Brahmi in July, there had been a political deadlock. To ease the situation, parties entered a national dialogue which was held for weeks; on 14 December 2013, both ruling and opposition parties agreed to choose Jomaa as the interim Prime Minister until the next election. His government was technocratic. The leftist Popular Front coalition doubted whether he could handle the present situation. His caretaker government carried out the process for new elections and attempted to deal with the economic issues.

After Habib Essid became Prime Minister in February 2015, Mehdi Jomaa spent a year away from political life until in early February 2016 he announced the formation of a think-tank and political program dubbed "Tunisia Alternatives". A year later, in March 2017, he converted Tunisia Alternatives into a political party.

Political offices
Preceded by Ali Laarayedh	Prime Minister of Tunisia; 2014–2015	Succeeded by Habib Essid
