= Benna =

Benna may refer to:

== Places ==
- Benna, Burkina Faso, a town in Boulgou province of Burkina Faso
- Benna Massif, a massif in the region of Guinea Maritime in Guinea
- Benna, Piedmont, a comune in the Province of Biella in Italy
- Benna (lake), a lake in Melhus municipality in Trøndelag county, Norway
- Benna, Papua New Guinea, the capital of the District of Unggai-Benna in Papua New Guinea
- Lower Benna Rural LLG, Papua New Guinea
- Upper Benna Rural LLG, Papua New Guinea

== People ==
- Beonna (Bishop of Hereford), 9th-century Anglo-Saxon bishop of Hereford
- Beonna of East Anglia, 8th-century king of East Anglia
- Benna Namugwanya (born 1967), Ugandan politician
- Benna Moe (1897–1983), Danish composer and musician
- Memia Benna (born 1966), Tunisian politician
- Anthony Benna (born 1987), French skier

== Other uses ==
- Benna (plant), a genus of plants whose sole species is Benna alternifolia
- Benna (genre), a genre of Antiguan folk music
- Benna TV, an Algerian television channel
