= Abdellatif Abid =

Tunisian politician

Abdellatif Abid (born 1 October 1947) is a Tunisian politician. He serves as the Minister of Education under Prime Minister Hamadi Jebali.

== Biography ==
=== Early life ===
Abdellatif Abid was born on 1 October 1947 in Korba, Tunisia. He is a founding member of Ettakatol's political bureau. He did research about Tunisian author Bachir Khraye's novel, Deglah Fi Arajinha. He later received a PhD in Linguistics.

=== Career ===
He taught in Grombalia, Jendouba, and Montfleury in Tunis. Since 1978, he taught Arabic Linguistics at the University of Carthage. He has been President of the Federation of Arab Translators. He was also a member of the Executive Committee of the Arab Organization for Translation in Beirut, Lebanon, and the Union of the Arabic Language. He has also worked on how to spread Arabic culture abroad at the Arab League Educational, Cultural and Scientific Organization (ALECSO) and the Islamic Educational, Scientific and Cultural Organization (ISESCO).

In 2013, he ordered an investigation into high school students that posted a viral video around the Harlem Shake dance.

=== Politics ===
He joined the Movement of Socialist Democrats under Ahmed Mestiri's leadership. He later became involved with Mustapha Ben Jafar's Democratic Forum for Labour and Liberties. On 20 December 2011, after former President Zine El Abidine Ben Ali was deposed, he joined the Jebali Cabinet as Minister of Education.

=== Personal life ===
He is married and has no children.

== Bibliography ==
- The al-Kitab al-asasi Lexicon (American University in Cairo Press, 2009)
