= Chahida Ben Fraj Bouraoui =

Tunisian politician

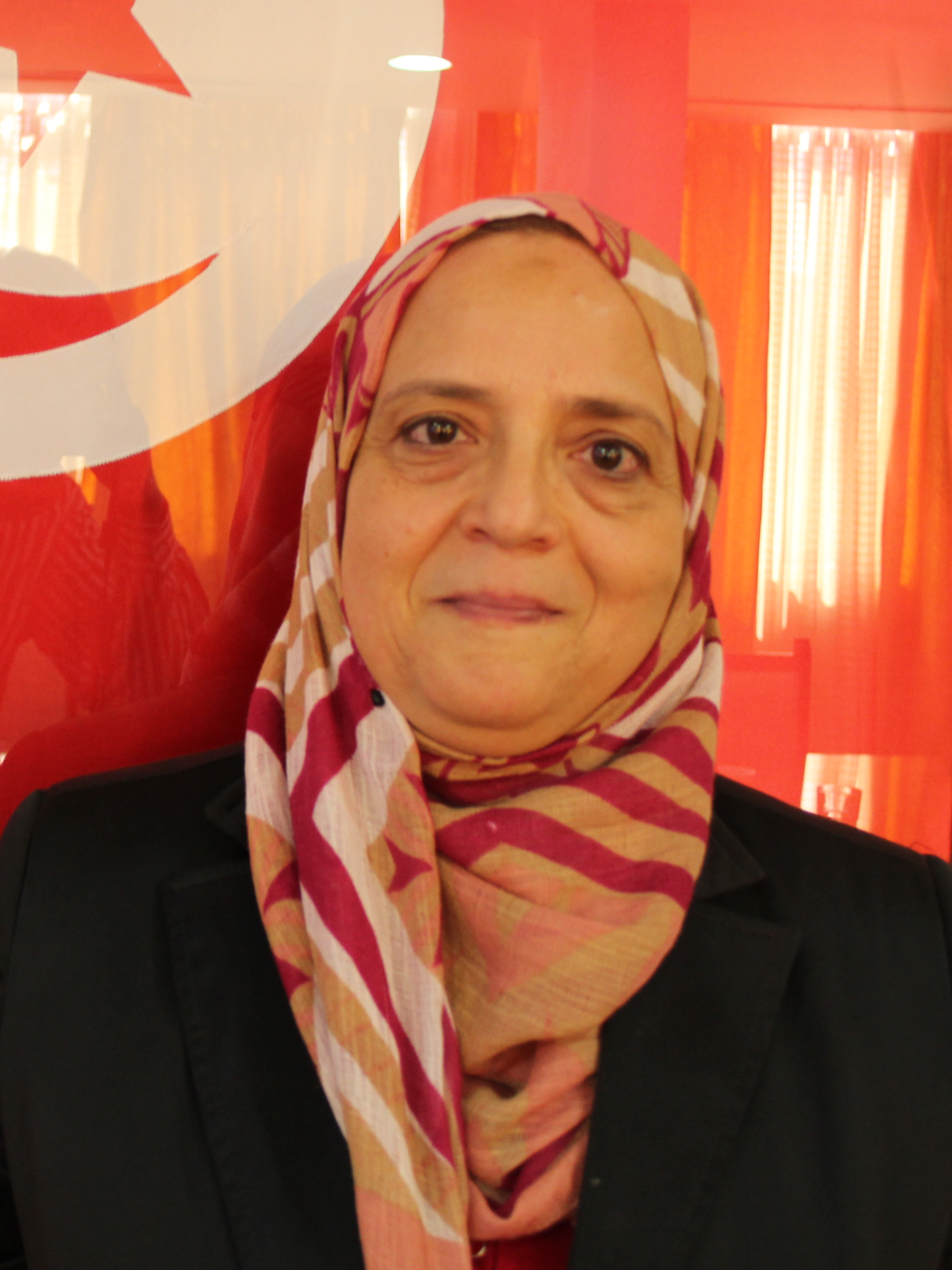
Portrait of Chahida Ben Fraj Bouraoui in 2017

Chahida Ben Fraj Bouraoui (born 1 September 1960 in Monastir, Tunisia) is an engineer, politician and deputy of the Assembly of the Representatives of the People as a representative of the Ennahda Movement. She was Secretary of State for Housing from 24 December 2011 to 29 January 2014, with Mohamed Salmane, Minister of Infrastructure and Environment.

== Life ==
She has a degree in civil engineering. From 2005, she was director of training for the Ministry of Infrastructure. From 2004 she was a member of the board of Tunisia Société Nationale Immobilière.

== See also ==
- Jebali Cabinet
- Laarayedh Cabinet
