= Abdelkarim Harouni =

Tunisian politician

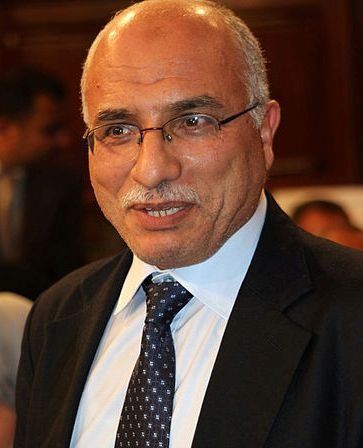
- Born: 17 December 1960 (age 65); La Marsa, Tunisia
- Education: Tunis El Manar University
- Political party: Ennahda Movement

Abdelkarim Harouni (Tunisian Arabic: عبد الكريم الهاروني; born 17 December 1960) is a Tunisian politician. He serves as the Minister of Transport under Prime Minister Hamadi Jebali.

== Biography ==
=== Early life ===
Abdelkarim Harouni was born on December 17, 1960, in La Marsa.

=== Politics ===
He was a founding member and twice Secretary General of the students' union Union Générale des Etudiants de Tunisie (UGET). He also served as Secretary General of the Freedom and Justice Association. In 1990, he became the editor of al Fajr, the flagship publication of the Ennahda Movement. He was arrested in 1990, and sentenced to prison in 1992. He was tortured and subjected to solitary confinement. He was released on November 7, 2007, but he still fell prey to the police's intimidation and harassment.

On 20 December 2011, he joined the Jebali Cabinet as Minister of Transportation. He was a member of the Constituent Assembly of Tunisia until he resigned in April 2012.
