= Jamel Eddine Gharbi =

Tunisian politician

Jamel Eddine Gharbi is a Tunisian politician. He serves as the Minister of Planning and Regional Development under Prime Minister Hamadi Jebali.

== Biography ==
=== Early life ===
Jamel Eddine Gharbi was born on December 4, 1964, in Jendouba. He received a PhD in Management from HEC Montréal in Montreal, Quebec, Canada.

=== Career in academia ===
He started his career as a university professor, and eventually served as Vice President of the University of Jendouba.

=== Politics ===
He is a member of the Ennahda Movement. On 20 December 2011, he joined the Jebali Cabinet as Minister of Planning and Regional Development.

=== Personal life ===
He is married, and has four children.

== Bibliography ==
- Ontologie du marketing
- Epistémologie du marketing
