= Elyes Fakhfakh =

Tunisian politician (born 1972)

- إلياس الفخفاخ
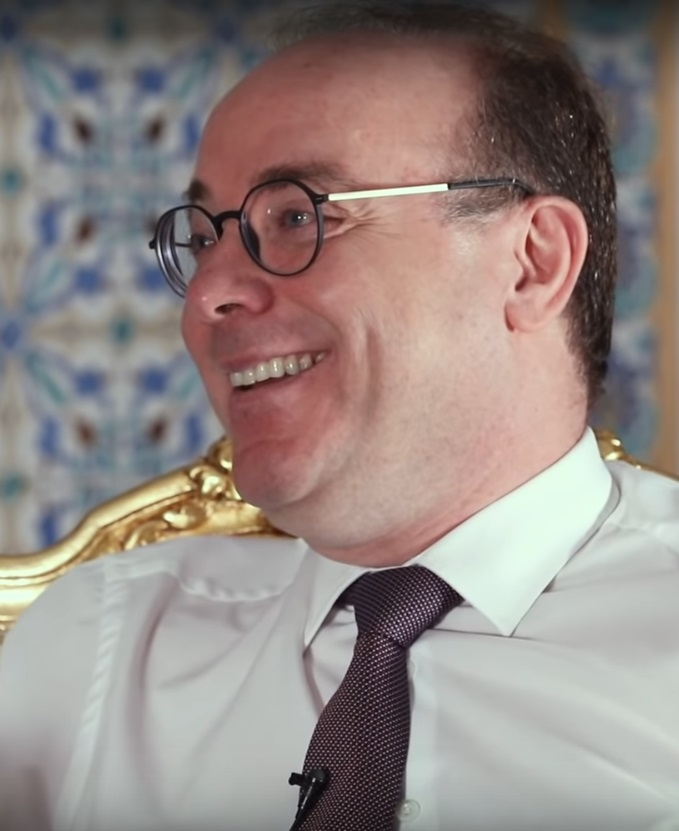
- Fakhfakh in 2020

Prime Minister of Tunisia
- In office 27 February 2020 – 2 September 2020
- President: Kais Saied
- Preceded by: Youssef Chahed
- Succeeded by: Hichem Mechichi

Minister of Finance
- In office 12 December 2012 – 29 January 2014
- Prime Minister: Hamadi Jebali; Ali Larayedh
- Preceded by: Houcine Dimassi
- Succeeded by: Hakim Ben Hammouda

Minister of Tourism
- In office 24 December 2011 – 13 March 2013
- Prime Minister: Hamadi Jebali
- Preceded by: Mehdi Houas
- Succeeded by: Jamel Gamra

Personal details
- Born: 1972 (age 53–54) Tunis, Tunisia
- Party: Democratic Forum for Labour and Liberties
- Education: National Engineering School of Sfax; Institut national des sciences appliquées de Lyon; University of Évry Val d'Essonne

Elyes Fakhfakh (Arabic: إلياس الفخفاخ; born 1972) is a Tunisian politician. He served as the minister of tourism and, starting on 19 December 2012, as the minister of finance as well, under Prime Minister Hamadi Jebali. He served as the prime minister of Tunisia from 27 February to 2 September 2020.

== Biography ==
Elyes Fakhfakh was born in Tunis in 1972. He studied Mechanical Engineering at the National Engineering School of Sfax and graduated in 1995. Then he studied Master's at the Institut National des Sciences Appliquées de Lyon. Later on, he had a Master's degree in Business Administration at University of Évry Val d'Essonne.

== Career ==
In 1999, at the age of 27, he started his career as an engineer for the French oil corporation Total S.A. He worked for Total in Europe, America and Asia, and from 2004 onwards in Poland. In 2004, he joined Cortrel, a Tunisian leaf spring manufacturing company, and later became its Deputy Director General.

He is a member of Ettakatol. On 20 December 2011, he joined the Jebali Cabinet as Minister of Tourism.

On 19 December 2012, he also took charge of the Ministry of Finance. He is successively assisted by two secretaries of state: Slim Besbes and Chedly Abed.

In the 2014 Tunisian parliamentary election, his party Ettakatol lost all of its previous seats. His party did even worse in the 2019 Tunisian parliamentary election by only getting 0.26 percent of the votes, and currently has no seat in the Assembly of the Representatives of the People.

He had participated in 2019 Tunisian presidential election and got 0.34% of votes in the first round.

On 20 January 2020, he was appointed head of government by President Kais Saied after consultations with all political parties, 10 days after the previous prime minister-designate, Habib Jemli, failed to gain the confidence of parliament.

The Fakhfakh government gained the confidence of parliament on 27 February 2020.

The Fakhfakh government consisted of 32 members of which six members were from Ennahda (Islamist, 54 out of 217 seats in Parliament), three from Democratic Current (social democrat, 22 MPs), two from People's Movement (15 MPs), two from Tahya Tounes (Liberal, 14 MPs), one member from Tunisian Alternative (Liberal, three MPs), one from Nidaa Tounes (Liberal, three MPs) and 17 Independent Politicians.

In June 2020, according to Al Jazeera, "an independent member of Parliament published documents indicating that Fakhfakh owned shares in companies that won deals worth 44 million dinars". Fakhfakh denied any wrongdoing. On 15 July 2020, he resigned.

== Personal life ==
He is married and has a son.

Political offices
Preceded by Youssef Chahed	Prime Minister of Tunisia; 2020	Succeeded by Hichem Mechichi
