= Bettayeb =

Bettayeb or Bettaieb is a surname. Notable people with the surname include:

- Adel Bettaieb (born 1997), French footballer
- Maamar Bettayeb (born 1953), Algerian control theorist, educator, and inventor
- Riadh Bettaieb (born 1961), Tunisian politician
