= Abderrahman Ladgham =

Tunisian politician (born 1947)

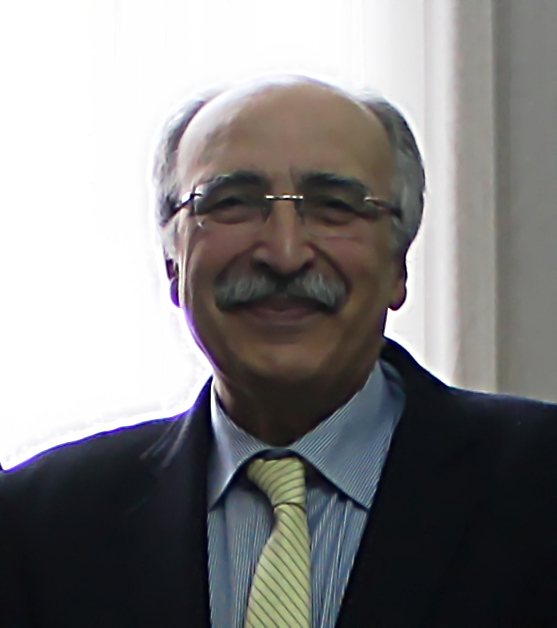
Abderrahman Ladgham

Abderrahman Ladgham (born 18 October 1947) is a Tunisian politician. He served as the deputy prime minister for governance & combating corruption under Prime Minister Hamadi Jebali.

== Biography ==
=== Early life and career ===
Ladgham was born on October 18, 1947, in Le Bardo, Tunisia. He attended the Faculty of Medicine in Tunis and he joined the student union Union Générale des Etudiants de Tunisie (UGET). He then studied cancerology in Paris. Back in Tunis, he worked as a university professor and as a cancerologue.

=== Political life ===
He is a member of the Ettakol political party. On 20 December 2011, after former President Zine El Abidine Ben Ali was deposed, he joined the Jebali Cabinet as Deputy Prime Minister for Governance & Combating Corruption.

=== Personal life ===
Ladgham is married and has three children.
