= Saïd Mechichi =

Tunisian lawyer, human rights activist and politician

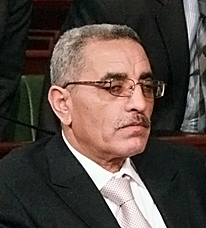
- Mechichi in March 2012.

Secretary of State to the Minister of the Interior in charge of Regional Affairs and Local Authorities
- Succeeded by: Abderrazak Ben Khelifa

Personal details
- Born: 5 March 1961 (age 65) Bou Salem (Tunisia)
- Party: Ettakatol
- Occupation: Lawyer
- Profession: Human right activist politician

Saïd Mechichi (born 3 May 1961 in Bou Salem) is a Tunisian lawyer, human rights activist and politician. He was first in charge of the Reform, then in charge of Regional Affairs and Local Communities.

He was Secretary of State to the Minister of the Interior from 2011 to 2014.

== Education ==
After primary and secondary studies in Bou Salem, Said studied at the Faculty of Law and Political Science of Tunis. He received his bachelor's degree in 1981 and his training diploma in 1985. He obtained another degree in private law in 1987.

== Professional career ==
Mechichi joined Democratic Forum for Labour and Liberties (Ettakatol) in 1994 and participated in political life by taking charge of legal issues. During the 2009 parliamentary elections he was the leader in the list of his party in Jendouba but the list was disqualified by the regime of Zine el-Abidine Ben Ali.

From 1994 to 2000, Said was also vice-president of the branch of the Tunisian Human Rights League in Jendouba. He later became the league's financial director.

In 2000 he joined the National Council for Freedoms in Tunisia and in 2003 established the Organization Against Torture.

In 2002, Mechichi received the Fadhel Ghdamsi Award for Human Rights awarded to young lawyers defending freedom of expression and opinion. After the fall of Ben Ali's regime during the 2011 revolution, he was elected to the Constituent Assembly and then joined the Hamadi Jebali’s government as Secretary of State for Reform, to the Minister of the Interior, Ali Larayedh Once Larayedh becomes Head of Government, he became in charge of Regional Affairs and Local Communities with Lotfi Ben Jeddou.

== See also ==
- Jebali Cabinet
- Laarayedh Cabinet
