= Mongi Marzouk =

Tunisian politician

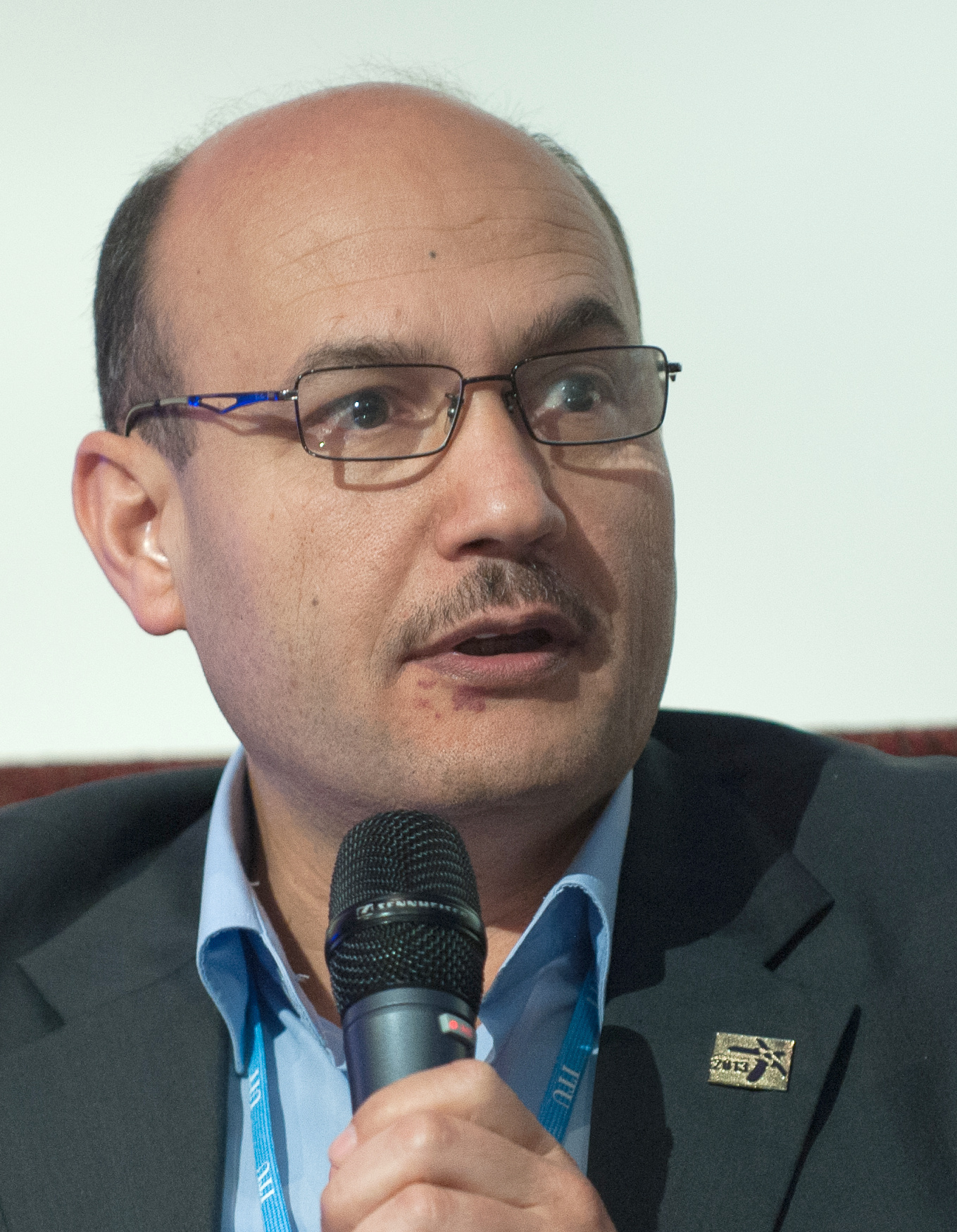
- Mongi Marzouk in 2013

Minister of Energy, Mines and Energy Transition
- In office 27 February 2020 – 2 September 2020
- Prime Minister: Elyes Fakhfakh

Personal details
- Born: 22 February 1958 (age 68) Matmata, Tunisia
- Education: Ecole Polytechnique; Télécom ParisTech

Mongi Marzouk (born 2 March 1961, in Matmata) is a Tunisian politician. From 27 February 2020 to 2 September 2020, he served as the Minister of Energy, Mines and Energy Transition in the government of Elyes Fakhfakh. Marzouk previously served as the Minister of Energy and Mines in the government of Habib Essid between January and August 2016. From December 2011 to January 2014, he served as the Minister of Information and Communication Technologies under Prime Minister Hamadi Jebali.

== Biography ==
He attended the Ecole Polytechnique from 1982 to 1984 and Télécom ParisTech from 1984 to 1986. He earned a PhD in Physics in 1989.

From 1999 to 2005, he worked as head of mobile network technology at Orange. He was later head of network modeling.

On 20 December 2011, after former President Zine El Abidine Ben Ali was deposed, he joined the Jebali Cabinet as Minister of Communication Technologies.
