= Ridha Saidi =

Tunisian politician

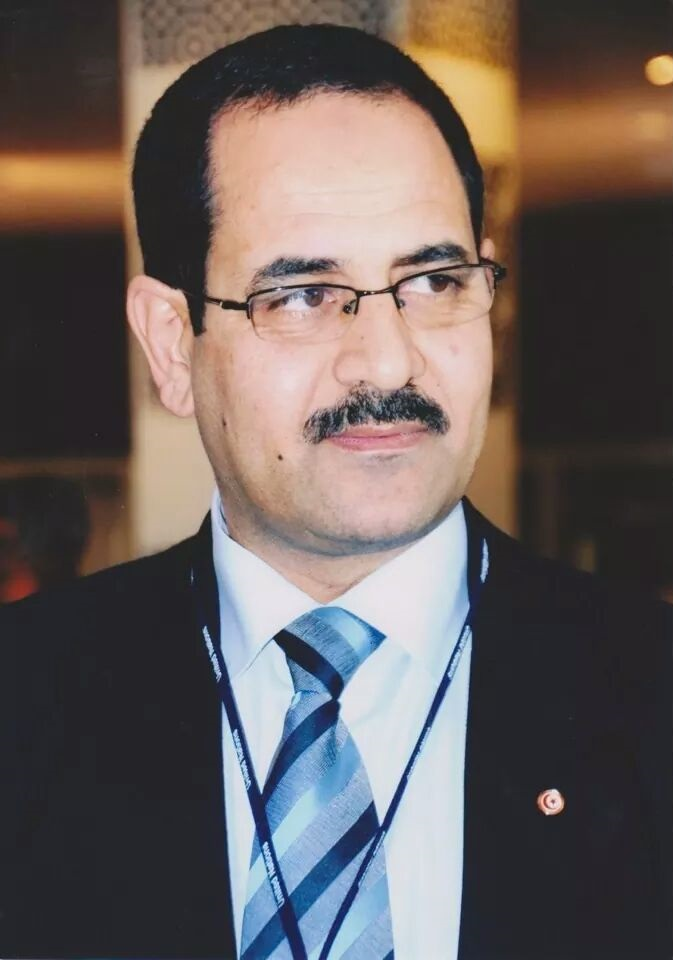
Ridha Saidi

Ridha Saidi (born 1962) is a Tunisian politician. He serves as the Minister of Economy under Prime Minister Hamadi Jebali.

== Biography ==
=== Early life ===
Ridha Saidi was born on 24 November 1962 in Menzel Bourguiba. He graduated from the Ecole Nationale d'Ingénieurs de Tunis and received a master's degree in Quality Management and Productivity. While at university, he was a founding member of the students' union Union Générale des Etudiants de Tunisie (UGET). In 1985, he joined the Islamist Tendency Movement, now known as the Ennahda Movement. He was jailed from 1991 to 2007 for his political activities.

=== Career in energy ===
He worked as an engineer for the Société Tunisienne de l'Electricité et du Gaz (STEG). In 2009, he wrote the article, Economie nationale : réalité et perspectives.

=== Minister ===
On 20 December 2011, after former President Zine El Abidine Ben Ali was deposed, he joined the Jebali Cabinet as Minister of Economy. In March 2012, he vowed to track down tax noncompliance to boost the Tunisian economy. In May 2012, he criticized Standard & Poor's for downgrading Tunisia's economy unfairly.
