= Mohamed Lamine Chakhari =

Tunisian politician

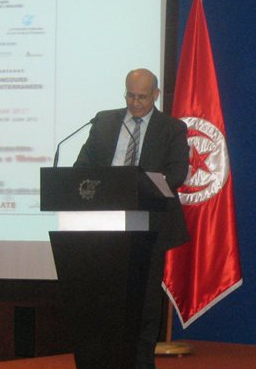

Minister of Industry
- Incumbent
- Assumed office 20 December 2011
- Prime Minister: Hamadi Jebali

Mohamed Lamine Chakhari (born 1957) is a Tunisian politician. He serves as the Minister of Industry under Prime Minister Hamadi Jebali.

== Biography ==
=== Early life ===
Mohamed Lamine Chakhari was born on 17 May 1957 in Foussana. He received a PhD in Mechanical engineering.

=== Career and politics ===
He works as a university professor at the National Engineering School of Tunis. He is also the chief executive officer of an industrial company and the head of its mechanical engineering department. He is a member of the Ennahda Movement.

=== Minister ===
On 20 December 2011, after former President Zine El Abidine Ben Ali was deposed, he joined the Jebali Cabinet as Minister of Industry and Commerce. On 16 February 2012, he became Minister of Industry only, and his former deputy minister, Bechir Zaafouri, became Minister of Trade and Handicraft.

In May 2012, he announced that natural gas lines would reach the governorates of Kasserine, Siliana, Jendouba, Beja, and El Kef in Northwestern Tunisia. In June 2012, he unveiled a $2.5 billion investment strategy in solar energy for the Société Tunisienne de l'Electricité et du Gaz (STEG).
