= Riadh Bettaieb =

Tunisian politician

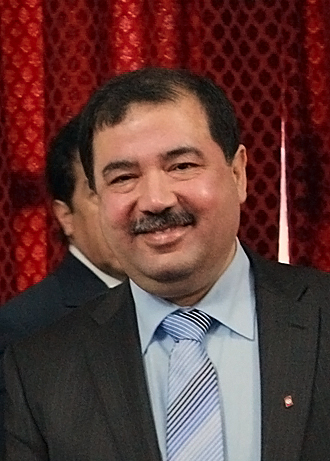
Riadh Bettaieb, Tunisian Minister of Investment and International Cooperation in the government

Riadh Bettaieb (born 1961) is a Tunisian politician. He serves as the Minister of Investment and International Cooperation under Prime Minister Hamadi Jebali.

== Biography ==
=== Early life ===
Riadh Bettaieb was born on 3 January 1961 in Ben Gardane. He graduated from the National School of Engineers.

=== Political activism and career ===
In 1979, he joined the Ennahda Movement. In 1991, he was forced into exile in Paris by the regime of Zine El Abidine Ben Ali. He was the Head of the Paris-based Tunisian Solidarity Association. After former President Ben Ali was deposed in 2011, he returned to Tunisia and joined the High Authority for the Achievement of the Revolution’s Objectives. He also serves as a Governor of the European Bank for Reconstruction and Development.

=== Minister ===
On 20 December 2011, he joined the Jebali Cabinet as Minister of Investment and International Cooperation. In May 2012, he said Tunisia and Malaysia would develop halal agriculture, medications and cosmetics together. He also suggested Tunisian companies would invest in Qatar.
