= FDTL =

The abbreviation FDTL can stand for:

- the Democratic Forum for Labour and Liberties (Forum démocratique pour le travail et les libertés), a Tunisian political party
- the Timor Leste Defence Force (Forças de Defesa de Timor Leste), the armed forces of Timor-Leste
- the Fund for the Development of Teaching and Learning, a teaching initiative of the Higher Education Funding Council for England
