= Mechichi =

Mechichi is a surname. Notable people with the surname include:

- Hichem Mechichi (born 1974), Tunisian politician
  - Mechichi Cabinet
- Saïd Mechichi (born 1961), Tunisian lawyer, human rights activist and politician
