= Moncef Ben Salem =

Tunisian politician (1953-2015)

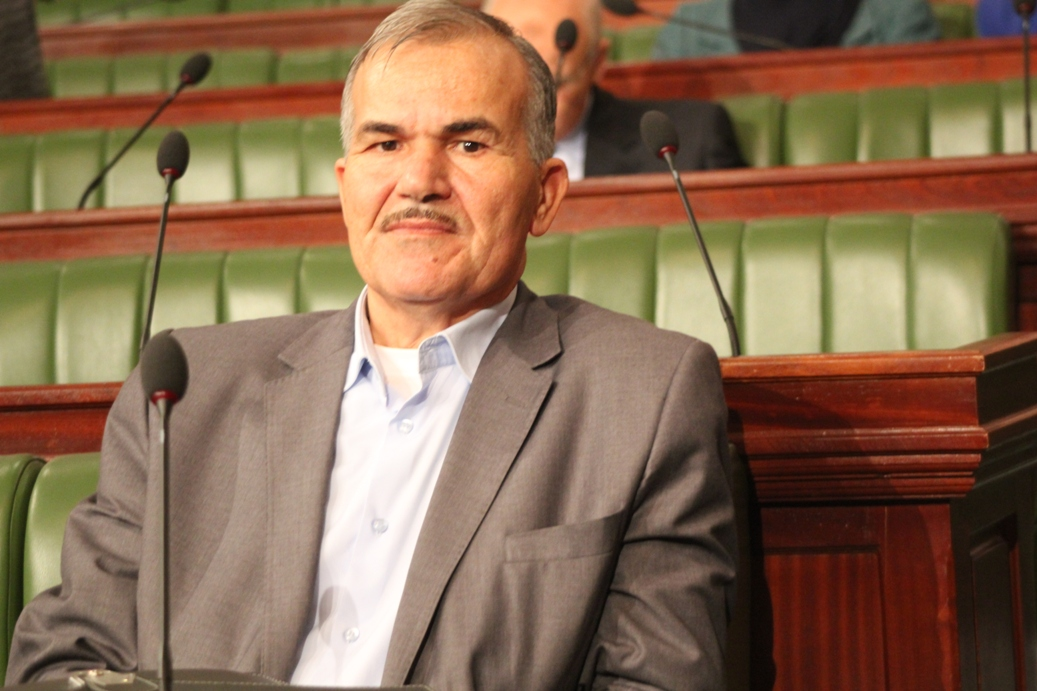
Moncef Ben Salem

Moncef Ben Salem (Tunisian Arabic: المنصف بن سالم; February 1, 1953 – March 24, 2015) was a Tunisian politician and university professor. He served as minister of higher education and scientific research under Prime Minister Hamadi Jebali.

== Biography ==
=== Early life ===
Moncef Ben Salem was born on 1 April 1953. He received a BA degree in Mathematics and Physics 1972 and a master's degree in Maths in 1974. He received PhDs in Maths and Physics from the University of Toulouse and Supméca in Paris. He was a member of the Union of Arab Mathematicians and Physicians from 1980 to 1987. He co-founded the Ecole Nationale d'Ingénieurs de Sfax in 1983

=== Political activism and career ===
He was a member of the Ennahda Movement. He was critical of Presidents Habib Bourguiba and Zine El Abidine Ben Ali, calling Bourguiba a "zionist". As a result of his political activism under Ben Ali, he was jailed for eighteen months from 1987 to 1989, and from 1990 to 1993. In 1987, his passport was revoked, and he was forbidden from leaving Tunisia or travelling inside the country for twenty years, as were his children. From 1993 to 2011, he was forced to live under surveillance. He was also forbidden to work as a university professor. During those years, he was supported by the Canadian Committee of Scientists and Scholars and the American Mathematical Society. He later taught at the University of Maryland in the US, at the French National Centre for Scientific Research in France, Italy, Germany, Belgium, and at the University of Sfax in Tunisia.

=== Minister ===
On 20 December 2011, after former President Ben Ali was deposed, he joined the Jebali Cabinet as Minister of Higher Education.

=== Death ===
He died on March 24, 2015, leaving a widow and 4 children.
