= Houcine Dimassi =

Tunisian politician (1948–2025)

Minister of Finance
- In office 24 December 2011 – 27 July 2012
- Prime Minister: Hamadi Jebali
- Preceded by: Jalloul Ayed
- Succeeded by: Elyes Fakhfakh

Personal details
- Born: 18 November 1948 Ksar Hellal, Monastir Governorate, French protectorate of Tunisia
- Died: 27 January 2025 (aged 76)
- Party: Nidaa Tounes
- Education: University of Tunis

Houcine al-Dimassi (Arabic: حسين الديماسي; 18 November 1948 – 27 January 2025) was a Tunisian politician. He served as the Minister of Finance under Prime Minister Hamadi Jebali.

== Life and career ==
=== Background ===
Houcine Dimassi was born in Ksar Hellal on 18 November 1948. He received a PhD in economics in 1983 and the agrégation in 1984.

Dimassi was married and had four children. He died on 27 January 2025, at the age of 76.

=== Career ===
Dimassi started his career as a university professor of economics at the University of Tunis. From 1988 to 1991, he served as Dean at the University of Sousse. He attended conferences of the World Bank, the Food and Agriculture Organization, and the United Nations Development Programme. In 2001, he wrote a report for the Tunisian General Labour Union.

On 20 December 2011, after the deposal of President Ben Ali, he joined the Jebali Cabinet as Minister of Finance and submitted his resignation, which was accepted, on 27 July 2012.
