= Troika (Tunisia) =

2011–2014 ruling political alliance between three parties

"Troika" "ترويكا"
- Founded: November 22, 2011
- Dissolved: November 20, 2014
- Parties: Ennahda Movement; Democratic Forum for Labour and Liberties; Congress for the Republic

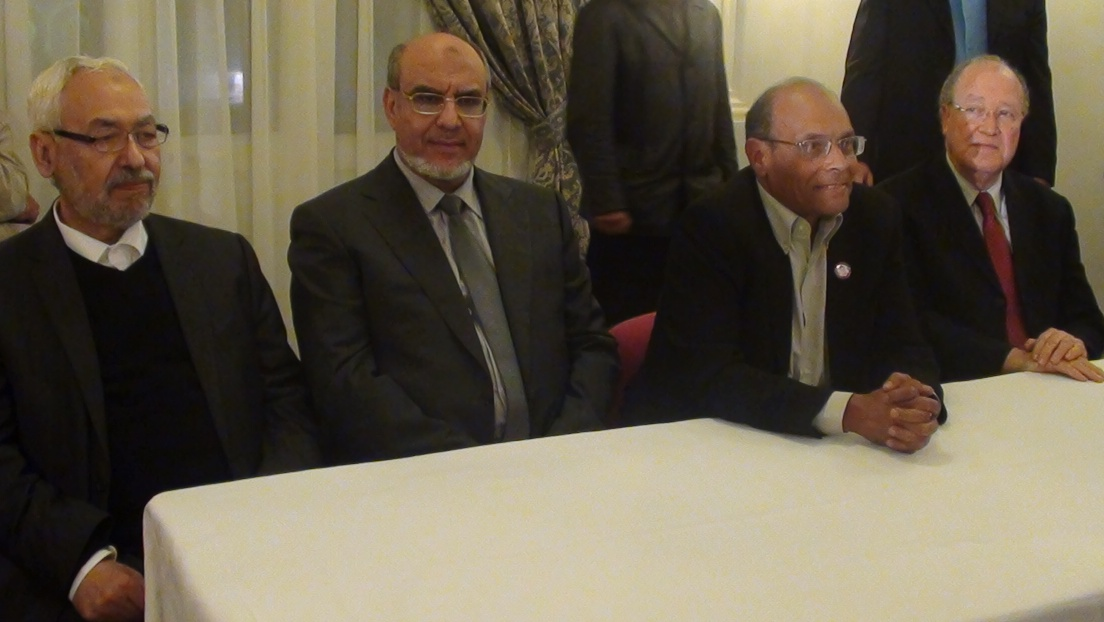
The leaders of the troika, from left to right: Rached Ghannouchi and head of government Hamadi Jebali (Ennahdha), President of the Republic Moncef Marzouki (CPR), Mustapha Ben Jafar (Ettakatol).

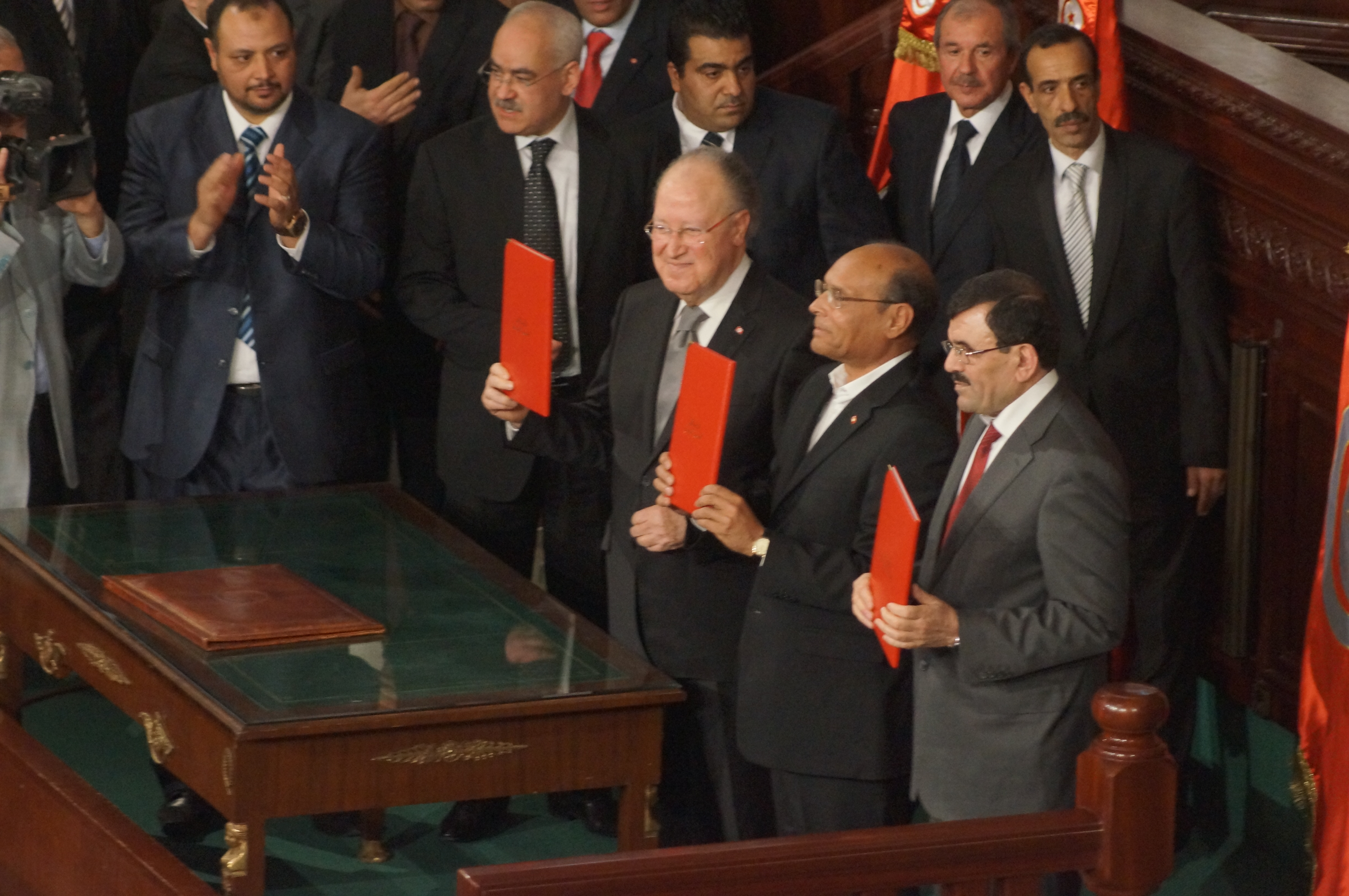
The three presidents at the signing ceremony of the new constitution, from right to left: the head of government Ali Laarayedh, the president of the republic Moncef Marzouki, the president of the Constituent Assembly Mustapha Ben Jafar.

The Troika was an unofficial name for the alliance between the three parties (Ennahda, Ettakatol, and CPR) that ruled in Tunisia after the 2011 Constituent Assembly election. Ali Laarayedh stepped down as prime minister on 9 January 2014; Mehdi Jomaa was appointed in his place on 10 January 2014.
