= Salim Ben Hamidane =

Tunisian politician

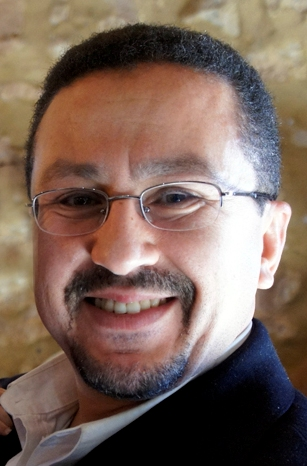
Salim Ben Hamidane

Salim Ben Hamidane is a Tunisian politician. He serves as the Minister of State Domains and Land Affairs under Prime Minister Hamadi Jebali.

== Biography ==
Salim Ben Hamidane was born on 12 May 1969 in El May, Djerba, Tunisia. Due to their support of Salah Ben Youssef, his family was persecuted by former President Habib Bourguiba.

He attended the University of Sousse, where he led the chapter of the Union Générale des Etudiants de Tunisie (UGET). He was harassed by the police under former President Zine El Abidine Ben Ali, and fled Tunisia in exile. He lives in Libya, Sudan and Lebanon, and studied Law in Beirut. He was arrested, tortured and threatened with deportation to Tunisia by the Syrian intelligence, and left for France in 1995. He was granted political asylum in 1998. He attended Paris Descartes University, where he received a B.A. in International Economic Law and Development and a PhD in Public Law. His thesis dealt with Islam and the State of Law.

In 2001, he became a founding member of the Congress for the Republic political party, and a member of the Executive Office of the International Organization of Tunisian Refugees. He was also appointed Deputy Director of the United Nations Forum for Democracy and Development. He is also a member of the Arab Society for the Defense of Human Rights.

On 20 December 2011, he joined the Jebali Cabinet as Minister of State Domains and Land Affairs.
