= Abdelwaheb Maatar =

Tunisian politician

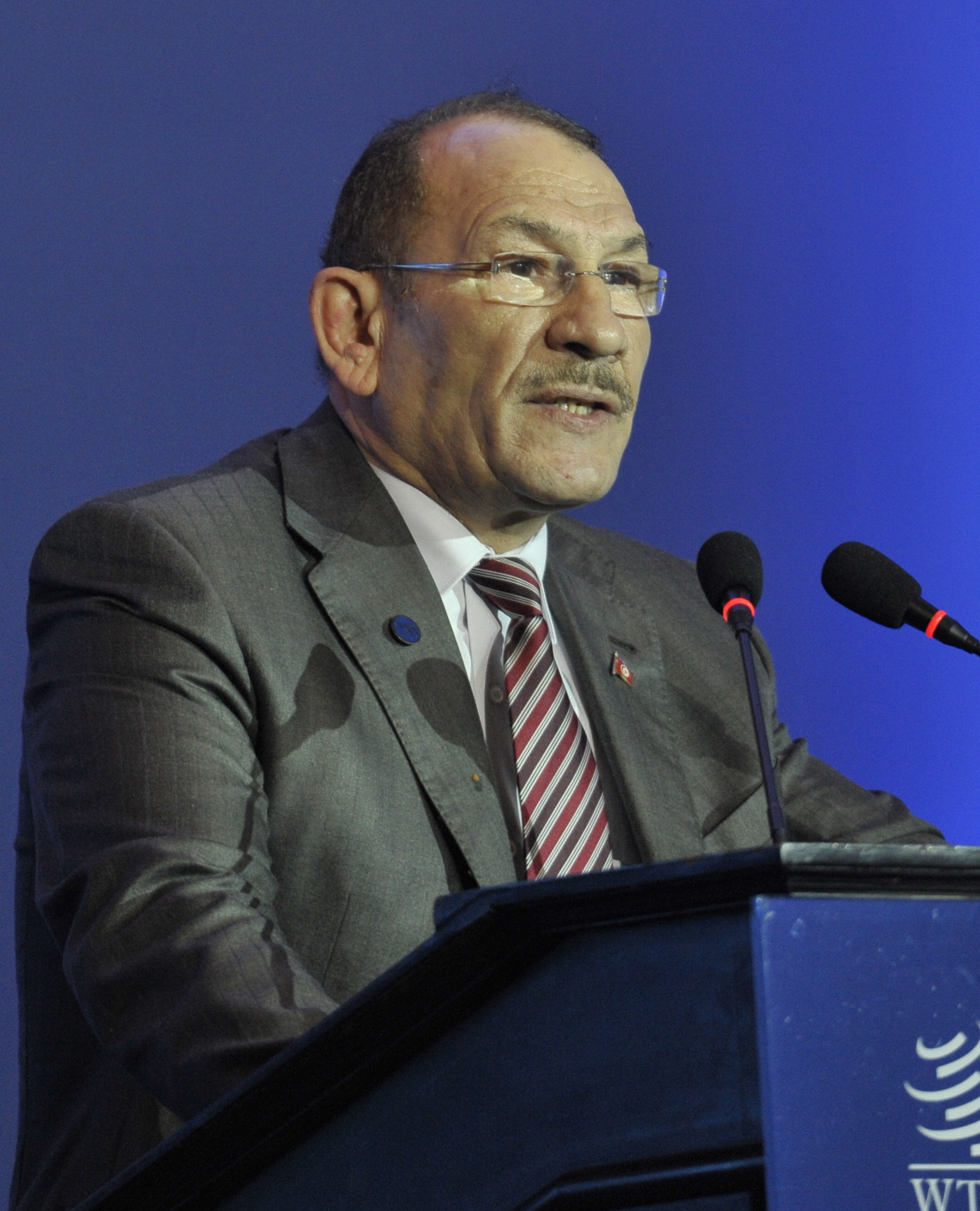
Abdelwaheb Maatar

Abdelwaheb Maatar is a Tunisian politician. He serves as the Minister of Training and Employment under Prime Minister Hamadi Jebali.

== Biography ==
=== Early life ===
Abdelwaheb Maatar was born on March 23, 1952, in Sfax. He received a diploma in Management from the National School of Administration in Tunis and a PhD in Political Science from the University of Tunis.

=== Career ===
He is a lawyer and a Constitutional Law professor at the University of Tunis.

=== Politics ===
He was involved with the Democratic Modernist Pole until he became a founding member of the Congress for the Republic (CPR) political party. He exposed the corruption of former President Zine El Abidine Ben Ali and tried to challenge his re-election in 2004. He serves as Vice-President of the International Association for the Support of Political Prisoners, and he is a founding member of the Tunisian Judicial Independence Center. He is also a fellow of the International Council on Human Rights in Geneva, Switzerland.

On 20 December 2011, he joined the Jebali Cabinet as Minister of Training and Employment. He has been accused of nepotism.

=== Private life ===
He is married, and has three children.
