= Walid Bennani =

Tunisian politician

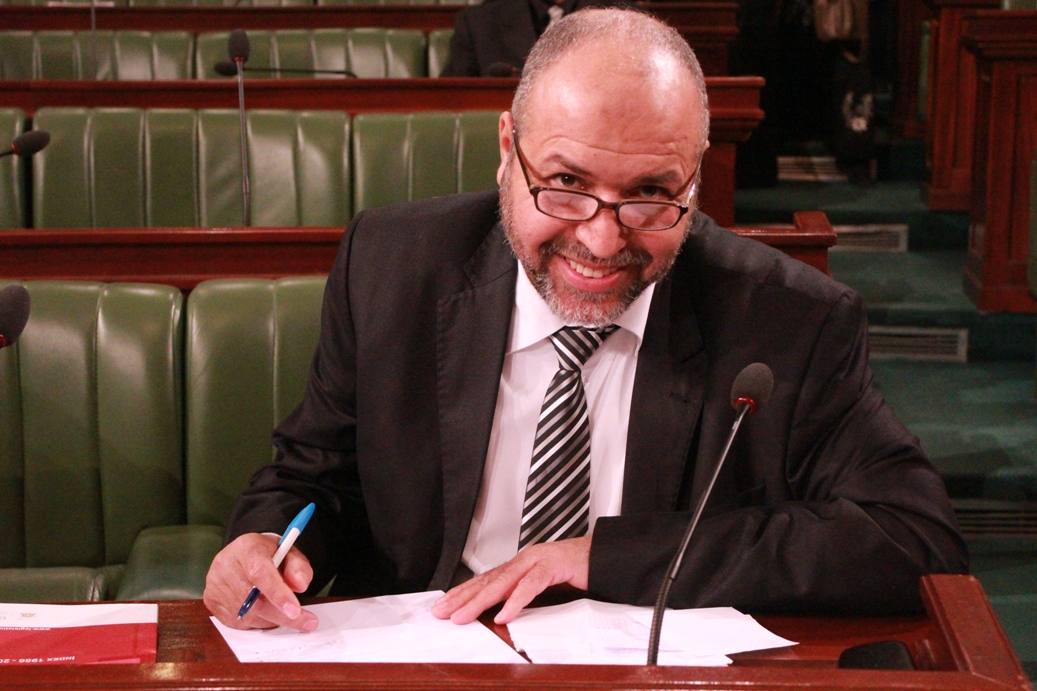

Walid Bennani, born on 11 November 1956 in Kasserine, is a Tunisian politician.

After graduating from the Tunisian École nationale d'administration in 1976, he worked for the Transportation Ministry.

A cofounder of the Movement of Islamic Tendency, he became president in 1991, then vice-president of the Ennahda Movement. In February 1992 he asked for asylum in Belgium, the Ben Ali regime soon asked for his extradition for alleged terrorist acts but it was finally rejected by the Belgian courts and Bennani was given the status of political refugee.

He was elected deputy for Kasserine in the Tunisian Constituent Assembly on 23 October 2011.
