= Memia Benna =

Tunisian politician

Memia Benna is a Tunisian politician. She serves as the Minister of the Environment under Prime Minister Hamadi Jebali.

== Biography ==
Memia Benna was born in 1966 in Tunis.

She worked as an assistant professor in Bizerte, and later as secretary general of the Higher Institute of Environmental Sciences and Technology in Borj Cedria.

On 20 December 2011, she joined the Jebali Cabinet as Minister of the Environment.
