= Nourredine Khadmi =

Tunisian politician

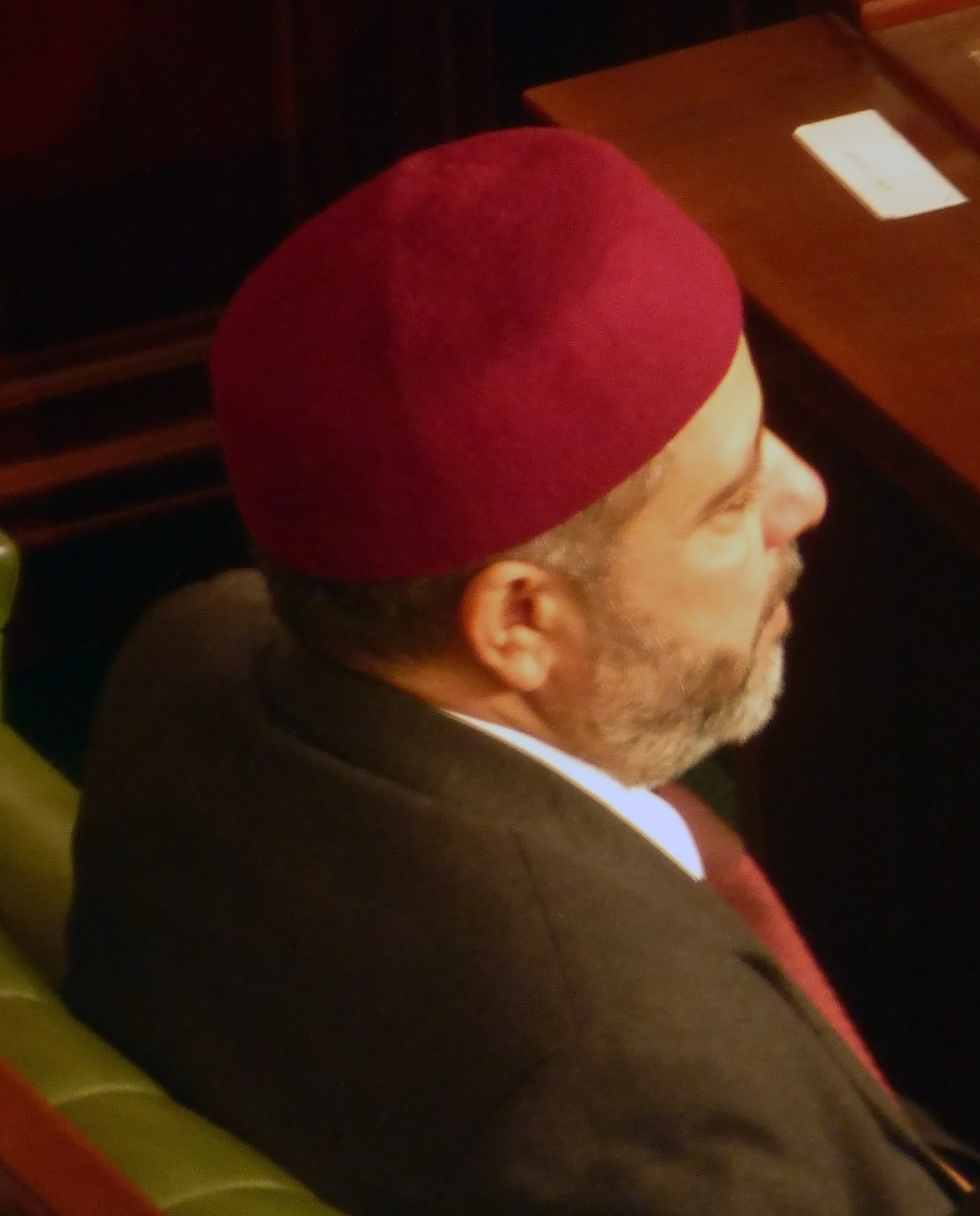
- Born: 18 May 1963 (age 63); Tela, Tunisia
- Education: University of Ez-Zitouna
- Occupation: Politician
- Known for: Minister of Religious Affairs under Prime Minister Hamadi Jebali

Nourredine Khadmi (born May 18, 1963) is a Tunisian politician. He served as the Religious Affairs under Prime Minister Hamadi Jebali.

== Life and career ==
=== Early life ===
Nourredine Khadmi was born in Tela, Tunisia. He studied the Quran at Ali Bahi mosque in Tela, where he was taught by Mohamed Abidi. He attended the University of Ez-Zitouna, where he received a degree in jurisprudence and Islamic politics. In 1993 and 1997, he received two PhDs from the same university.

=== Career ===
He taught Muslim theology in Tunisia and Saudi Arabia. He is a member of the International Committee of the Organization of Islamic Congress's Bioethics Commission. He has worked as a researcher for the Arab Encyclopedia at the Arab Organization for Education, Science and Culture, the Encyclopedia of Fundamentalism in Kuwait, and the Center for Research and Islamic Studies in Riyadh.

=== Minister ===
On 20 December 2011, he joined the Jebali Cabinet as Minister of Religious Affairs.

=== 2022 Travel ban ===
On Thursday 18 August 2022 Khadmi was banned, along with members of his family, from traveling outside of Tunisia. The ban came after his name was added, for the eighth time, to the "S17" national database, a mechanism through which the Tunisian authorities track and limit the mobility of those suspected of links to terrorist groups and organizations.
