= Khalil Zaouia =

Tunisian politician

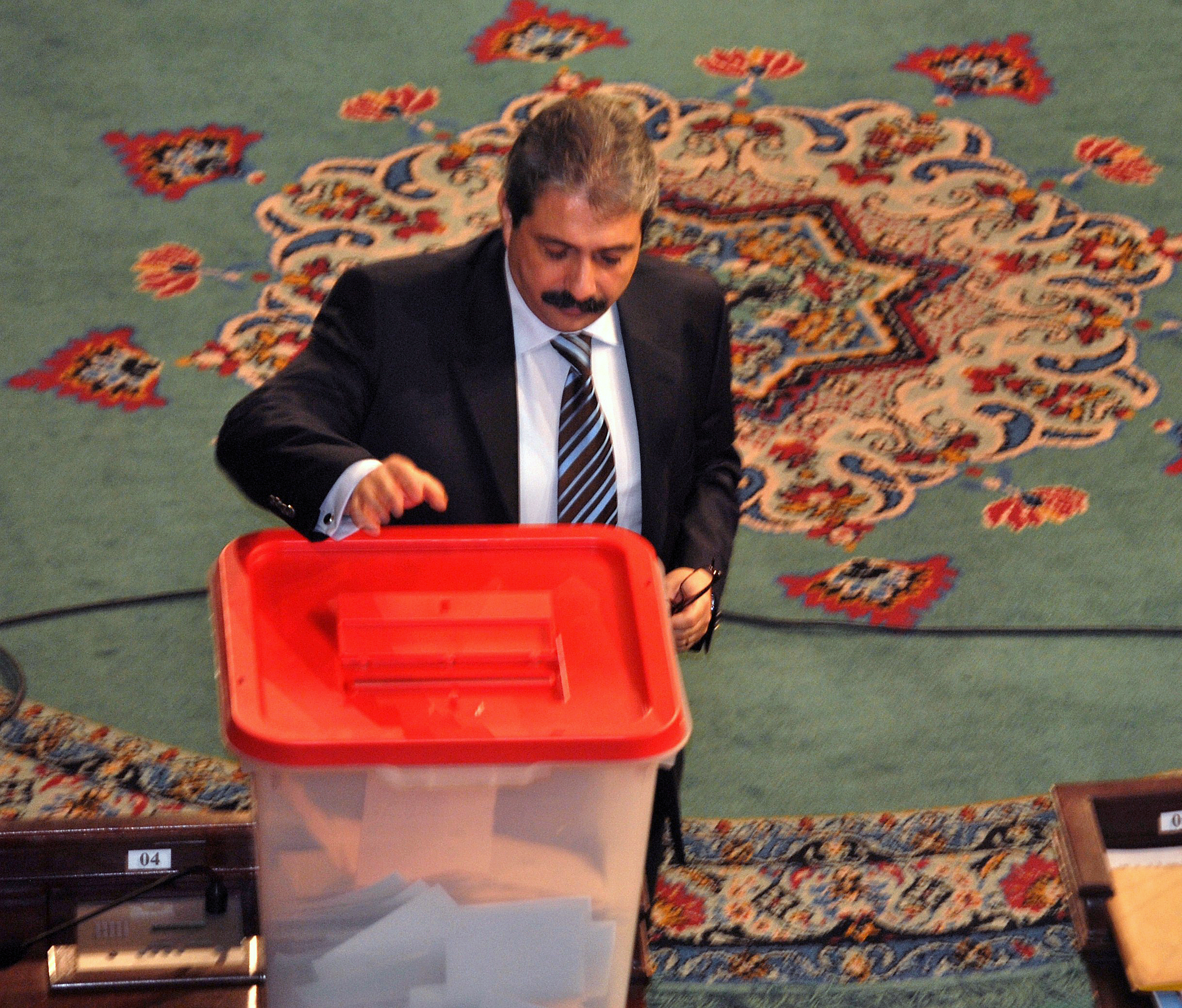
Khalil Zaouia

Khalil Zaouia is a Tunisian politician. He serves as the Minister of Social Affairs under Prime Minister Hamadi Jebali.

== Early life and career ==
Khalil Zaouia was born on July 20, 1961, in Tunis. He has been a professor and orthopedic surgeon at the Charles-Nicolle Hospital of Tunis since July 2011 in Tunis.

== Political career ==
He has served on the board of trustees of the Ligue Tunisienne des Droits de l'Homme since 1988. He is a founding member of the Ettakatol political party, and a member of the Tunisian General Labour Union. He is a former advisor of Mustapha Ben Jafar.

On 20 December 2011, he joined the Jebali Cabinet as Minister of Social Affairs.

== Personal life ==
He is married, and has two children.
