= Jamila Ksiksi =

Tunisian politician (1968–2022)

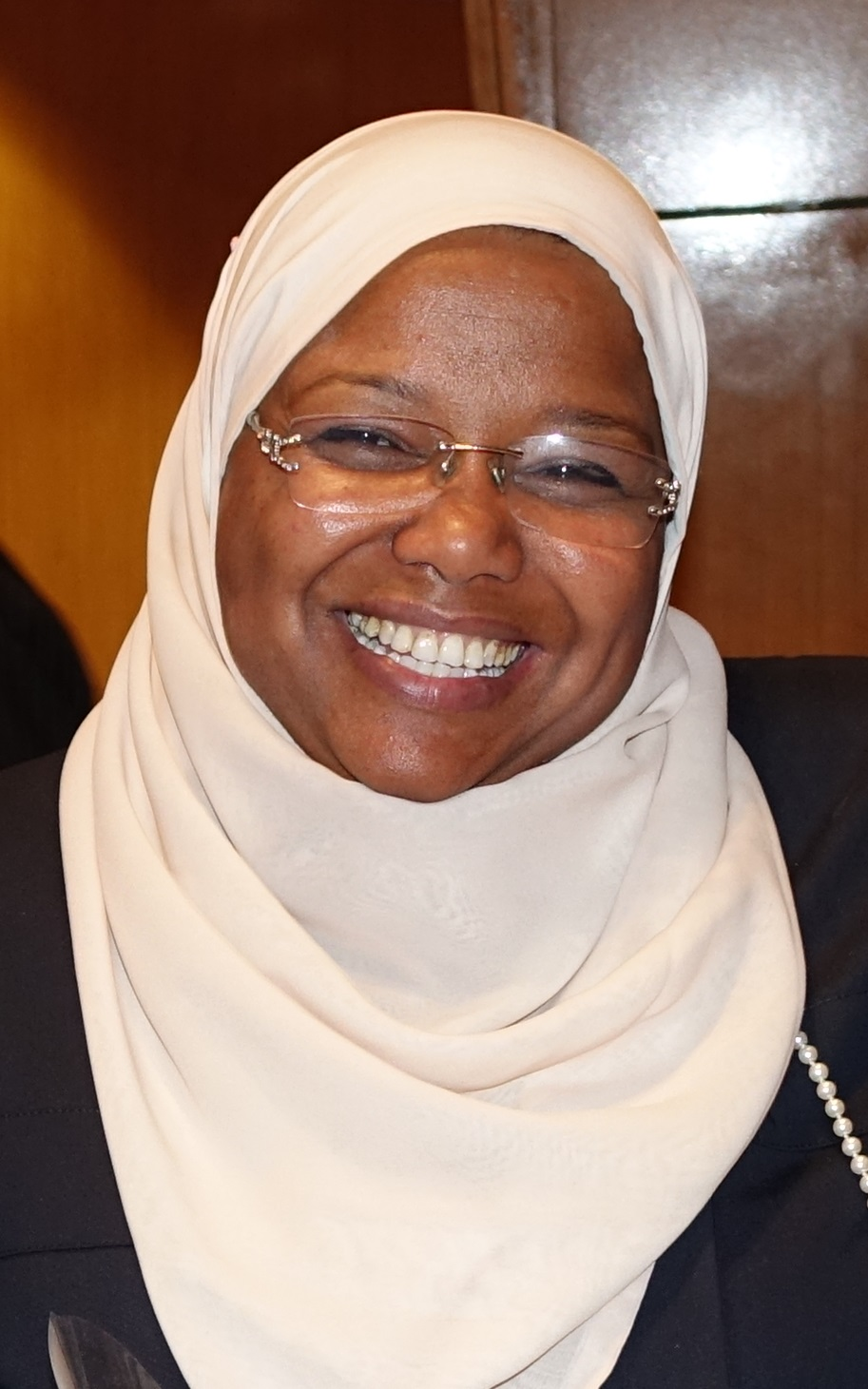
Ksiksi in 2014

Jamila Debbech Ksiksi (Arabic: جميلة دبش كسيكسي; 14 August 1968 – 19 December 2022) was a Tunisian politician from Ennahda. In 2014, she was elected to the Assembly of the Representatives of the People becoming the country's first Black woman MP. She was a prominent activist in the Tunisian anti-racist movement and supported Law 50 which criminalizes racial discrimination.

On 19 December 2022, she was killed alongside her sister in a traffic collision near Sfax, at the age of 54.
