= Noureddine Bhiri =

Tunisian politician (born 1958)

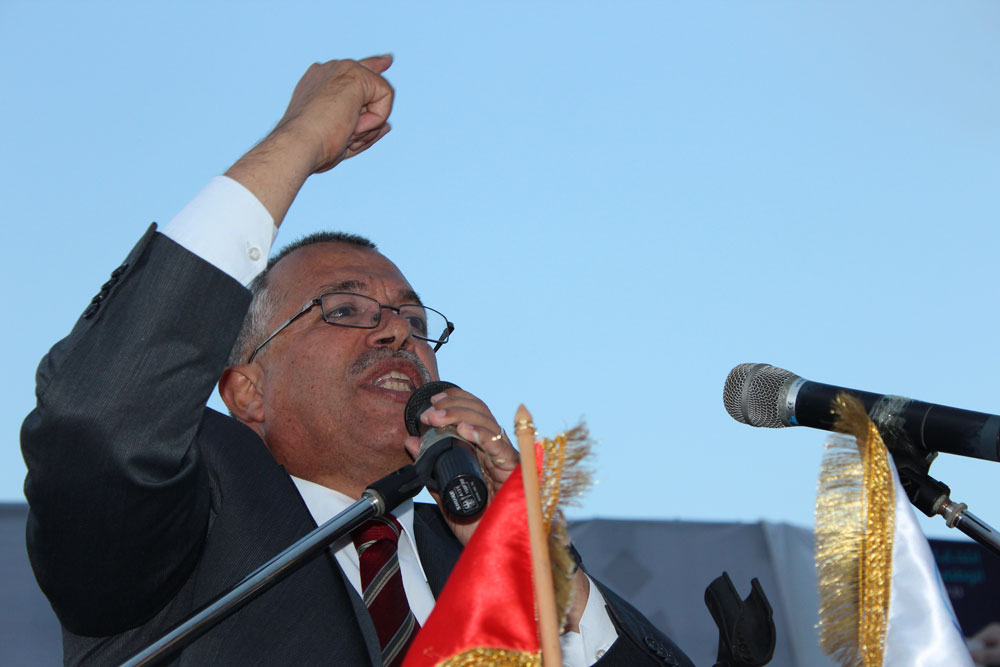
- Born: 10 July 1958 (age 68); Jebiniana, Tunisia

Noureddine Bhiri (also known as Noureddine El-Beheiry; born 10 July 1958) is a Tunisian politician. He served as the minister of justice under prime minister Hamadi Jebali.

== Career ==
Born in Jebiniana, he received a master's degree in Law and Political Science from Tunis University. He joined the Ennahda Movement in 1977. He was jailed from February to September 1987 under President Habib Bourguiba. He then worked as a lawyer in Tunis. In 1988, he praised then-President Zine El Abidine Ben Ali. In 2006, he wrote an article for Nawaat against the American-Israeli policy towards the Palestinian territories.

On 20 December 2011, after former President Ben Ali was deposed, he joined the Jebali Cabinet as Minister of Defence.

Following the victory of Ennahdha in the election of the Constituent Assembly of October 23, 2011, during which he is elected in the constituency of Ben Arous, he becomes the December 24, 2011 Minister of Justice in the Hamadi government Jebali. He succeeds Lazhar Karoui Chebbi, minister in the Béji Caïd Essebsi government. He resigns from his constituent seat on May 9, 2012.

Bhiri, is criticized for having taken the head of the High Council of the Judiciary, raising many reactions among members of the Tunisian Association of magistrates who oppose this decision may harm according to them independence of justice.

Following the murder of Chokri Belaïd on February 6, 2013, and the failure of the Jebali initiative announced that evening, consisting of the formation of a government of technocrats, Bhiri is among the candidates for replace Jebali at the head of the government.

Finally, Ennahdha chooses Ali Larayedh, who is charged by President Moncef Marzouki to form a new government in which Bhiri is not reappointed, becoming Minister Delegate to the Head of Government.

He was elected to the Assembly of People's Representatives in the elections of October 26, 2014.

== Arrest in 2021 ==
On 31 December 2021, Ennahda claimed in a statement that Bhiri had been abducted by “security forces with civilian clothes and taken to an unknown destination." On 2 January 2022, Bhri was admitted to hospital and recovered in to intensive care in the northern town Bizerte. His conditions are described as critical. The speaker of Tunisia's suspended parliament, Rached Ghannouchi wrote to President Kais Saied asking him to reveal the whereabouts and condition of Bhiri. On October 18, 2024, Bhiri was sentenced to ten years in prison for endangering state security, inciting civil disobedience and calling for insurrection.

== Personal life ==
He is married and has four children.
