= Mohamed Ben Salem =

Tunisian politician

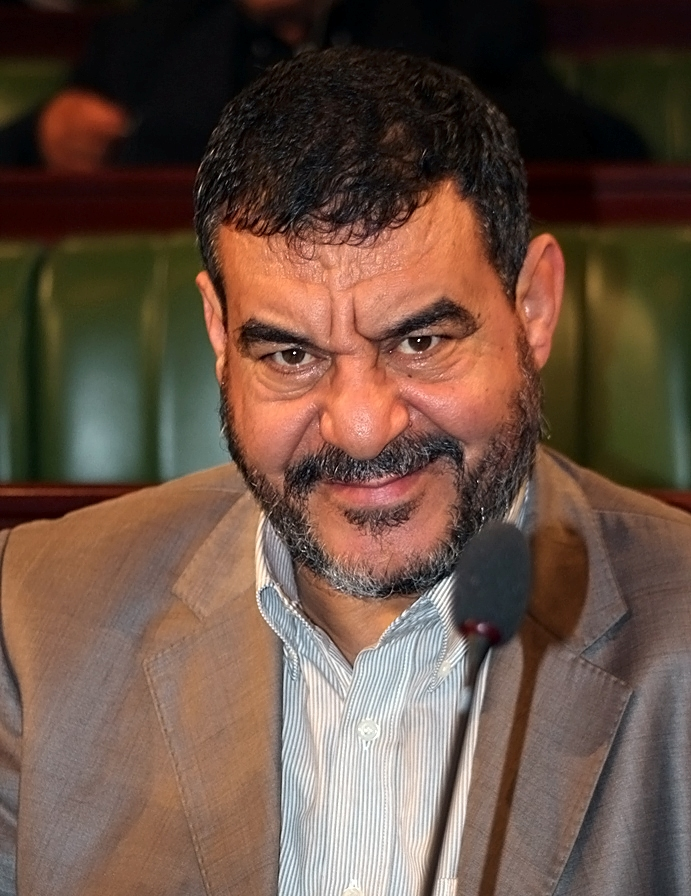

Tunisian Minister of Agriculture
- In office 24 December 2011 – 29 January 2014
- President: Moncef Marzouki
- Prime Minister: Hamadi Jebali (2011–13), Ali Laarayedh (2013–14)
- Preceded by: Mokhtar Jallali
- Succeeded by: Lassaad Lachaal

Personal details
- Born: 19 February 1953 (age 73)
- Party: Ennahda Movement

Mohamed Ben Salem, born on 19 February 1953, is a Tunisian politician. He served from December 2011 to January 2014 as Minister of Agriculture under the Prime Ministers Hamadi Jebali and Ali Laarayedh.

== Political activism ==
He is a member of the Ennahda Movement. In 1987, he was jailed for nine months, and two and a half months between the years 1990 and 1991. He lived in exile in France from 1991 to 2011. During that time, he was involved with the Paris-based Tunisian Solidarity Association.

== Minister ==
On 20 December 2011, after former President Zine El Abidine Ben Ali was deposed, he joined the Jebali Cabinet as Minister of Agriculture. He remained in office in the Laarayedh Cabinet.

== Career ==
Associate Manager of a CIVIL SOCIETY ESTATE "AL BARAKA" having a capital of 282,030.68 EURO
