= Habib Jemli =

Tunisian politician (born 1959)

- الحبيب الجملي

Secretary of State to the Tunisian Minister of Agriculture
- In office 24 December 2011 – 29 January 2014
- Prime Minister: Hamadi Jebali; Ali Larayedh
- Preceded by: office created
- Succeeded by: office abolished

Personal details
- Born: 28 March 1959 (age 67) Kairouan, Tunisia
- Party: Independent

Habib Jemli or Habib Jomli (Arabic: الحبيب الجملي; born 28 March 1959) is a Tunisian politician.

He was the Secretary of State to the Minister of Agriculture from 2011 to 2014. He is an independent but is close to Ennahdha. He was appointed in 2019 to become the Tunisian head of government. In 2020, his government failed to gain the confidence of the Assembly of the Representatives of the People, making him the first appointed head of government not to take office.

== Biography ==
He is an agricultural engineer and holds a Master's degree in agricultural economics and in management of agricultural institutions. He is a specialist in agricultural development and business management and is the author of several studies and research in these fields.

Professionally, he worked in research units in the field of field crops as well as in the quality and development department at the ministry of agriculture, and also runs a private company.

Close to Ennahdha, he assumed the position of Secretary of State to the Minister of Agriculture, Mohamed Ben Salem, from 2011 to 2014.

On 15 November 2019, he was appointed head of government by President Kaïs Saïed. He presented his list of ministers on 2 January 2020. Although they were independent, some ministers were close to Ennahdha and Heart of Tunisia. On 10 January 2020, he failed to gain the confidence of the Assembly of the Representatives of the People.

Habib Jemli is the father of four children.
