= Sihem Badi =

Tunisian politician

Dr. Sihem Badi
- سهام بادي
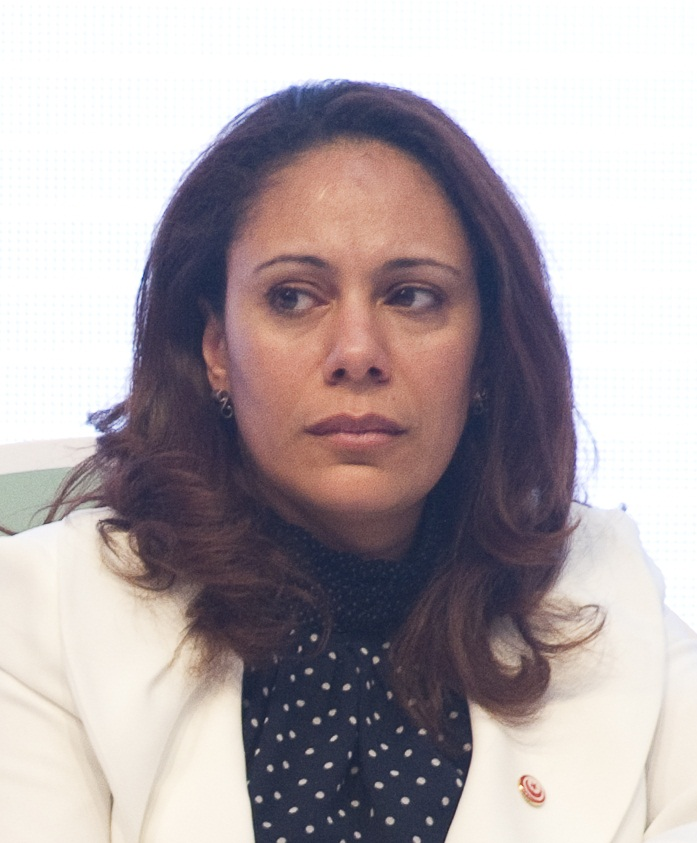
- Dr. Badi in 2014

Personal details
- Born: 1967 (age 58–59) Degache, Tunisia
- Party: Congress for the Republic
- Education: PhD in Medical Studies
- Alma mater: Paris Diderot University Faculty of Medicine of Tunis
- Occupation: Doctor, Politician

Sihem Badi is a Tunisian politician. She served as the Minister of Women's Affairs under Prime Minister Hamadi Jebali.

== Early life ==
Sihem Badi was born on 12 June 1967, in Degache. She received a PhD in Medical Studies from the University of Paris.

== Career ==
As of 2011, Badi was a member of the Congress for the Republic political party. She was sentenced to two years in prison when she was a student activist at Faculty of Medicine of Tunis after she condemned former President Zine El Abidine Ben Ali, whereupon she went to France in exile between 1992 and 2008.

On 20 December 2011, she joined the Jebali Cabinet as Minister of Women's Affairs. She has said she would like to see more women in leadership positions.

On 25 March 2013, protesters congregated to demand Badi's resignation after she blamed a nursery caretaker's rape of a three-year-old girl on the girl's family.
