= Samir Dilou =

Tunisian politician

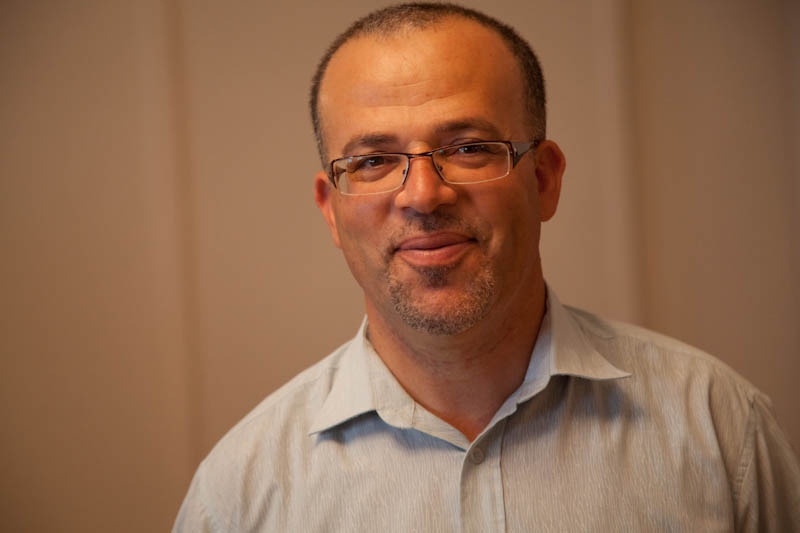
Samir Dilou

Samir Dilou is a Tunisian politician. He served as the Minister of human rights, transitional justice and government spokesperson under Prime Minister Hamadi Jebali.

== Biography ==
=== Early life ===
Samir Dilou was born in Tunis in 1966. He graduated from the University of Sousse in 1991. He was sentenced to ten years in prison as a result of his political involvement with the students' union Union Générale des Etudiants de Tunisie (UGET).

=== Career ===
He is a lawyer and a member of the executive committee of the Ennahda Movement. He is one of the founders of the International Organization to Defend Political Prisoners and a member of Truth and Work Organization in Switzerland. On 20 December 2011, he joined the Jebali Cabinet as Minister of Human Rights and Transitional Justice and Spokesperson of the Government.

=== Minister ===
Some opposition sources claim that in February 2012, he criticised freedom of the press. His opponents claim that he later added that freedom of expression and strikes were a privilege, not a right. He also decided to remove the police from the campus of Manouba University in Manouba, where students have been demonstrating to wear the niquab.

His opponents maintain also that in the same month, he said on Samir El-Wafi's program on national television that homosexuality was not a human rights issue, but a condition in need of medical treatment. Amnesty International condemned this statement. In June 2012, he rejected the United Nations Human Rights Council's recommendation to decriminalize same-sex intercourse, arguing it was a Western concept at odds with Islam, Tunisian culture and traditions. Critics have argued the anti-gay legislation was passed under French Tunisia.

== See also ==
- 18 October Coalition for Rights and Freedoms
