= Zouheir M'Dhaffar =

Tunisian politician

Zouheir M'Dhaffar (born 1948) served as the Tunisian Minister of Public Property and Real Estate Affairs under former President Zine El Abidine Ben Ali from January 2010 to January 2011.

== Biography ==
Zouheir M'Dhaffar was born on December 20, 1948, in Sfax, Tunisia. He holds a PhD and the agrégation. He taught Law and Political Science, and was involved with the Constitutional Democratic Rally. He was a founding member of the Académie Internationale de Droit Constitutionnel, and he was also involved with the Arab Maghreb Union.

In January 2010, he was appointed as Minister of Public Property and Real Estate Affairs. He resigned in January 2011, in the aftermath of the 2010–2011 Tunisian revolution.
