= Mohamed Salmane =

Tunisian politician

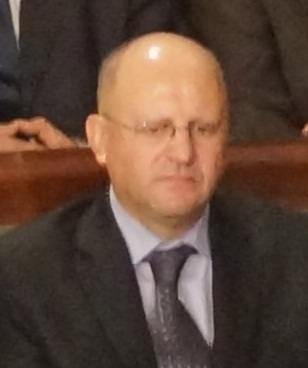
- Official portrait, 2020

Housing and Equipment
- Prime Minister: Hamadi Jebali

Personal details
- Born: 1958 (age 67–68)

Mohamed Salmane (born 1958) is a Tunisian politician. He serves as the Minister of Housing and Equipment under Prime Minister Hamadi Jebali.

== Biography ==
Mohamed Salmane was born on 9 October 1958 in Nabeul. He received a Bachelor of Science degree in Civil engineering.

He has been the General Director of the Tunisian-Libyan Investment Office and the Chief Executive Officer of Tunisie Autoroutes. On 20 December 2011, after former President Zine El Abidine Ben Ali was deposed, he joined the Jebali Cabinet as Minister of Housing and Equipment.

He is married and has three children.
