= Benna alternifolia =

Scientific classification
- Kingdom: Plantae
- Clade: Tracheophytes
- Clade: Angiosperms
- Clade: Eudicots
- Clade: Rosids
- Order: Myrtales
- Family: Melastomataceae
- Genus: Benna; Burgt & Ver.-Lib. (2022)
- Species: B. alternifolia

Binomial name
- Benna alternifolia Burgt & Ver.-Lib. (2022)

Species of flowering plant

Benna alternifolia is a species of flowering plant in family Melastomataceae. It is a perennial evergreen herb up to 1.2 meters in diameter, endemic to Guinea's Benna Plateau from 300 to 800 meters elevation.

It grows on vertical sandstone rock faces in deep shade with year-round moisture, in canyons 10–100 m deep or in the deep shade of trees.
