= 18 October Coalition for Rights and Freedoms =

The 18 October Coalition for Rights and Freedoms in Tunisia (French: Collectif du 18 Octobre) was formed when a number of political parties, NGOs and human rights activists advocating various political ideologies, among them Islamists, secularists and communists, came together to campaign against the dictatorship, political misconduct and human rights violations of Tunisian president Zine El Abidine Ben Ali’s regime in pre-revolutionary Tunisia. As the head of the Tunisian Journalists Union (SNJT-French: Syndicat National des Journalistes Tunisiens) and human rights activist Lutfi Hajji writes, the coalition “expressed the long- cherished hope of the political and civil forces in the country that by rallying around basic claims, a balance could be reached between the ruling party, which had dominated all aspects of political life for half a century, and the opposition forces which remained disparate and hindered by their internal and external disputes.”

The Coalition arose out of a protest, organised by opposition and human rights groups, against the hosting of the United Nations-sponsored World Summit on the Information Society by Tunisia, in November 2005. The sit-in involved a 52-day protest at the headquarters of the Tunisian Order of Lawyers in Tunis and a 32-day hunger strike by the following eight national personalities representing various political parties and civil organisations: Abderraouf Ayadi, Ahmed Najib Chebbi, Samir Dilou, Hamma Hammami, Mohamed Nouri, Ayachi Hammami, Mokhtar Yahyaoui and Lutfi Hajji. The strike began on 18 October 2005, one month before the World Summit on the Information Society, in order to draw attention to the violations of basic freedoms in Tunisia.

The demands were:

- Freedom of association for all
- Freedom of information and expression
- Release of political prisoners

A forum was formed in which the opposition groups elaborated a shared vision for a democratic Tunisia. The Coalition produced joint position papers on fundamental issues such as consensus on democracy, civil liberties, gender equality, freedom of belief and conscience and the relationship between religion and state. The Coalition also laid the foundation for future common ground between Tunisia’s main political opposition forces, which served as a basis for cooperation after the Revolution.
