= Al Fajr =

Daily newspaper published in Abu Dhabi

- Type: Daily newspaper
- Founder: Obaid Humaid Al Mazrooei
- Publisher: Dar Al Fajr Printing, Publishing and Advertising
- Founded: 1974; 52 years ago
- Language: Arabic
- Headquarters: Abu Dhabi
- Country: United Arab Emirates
- Website: Al Fajr website

Al Fajr (Arabic: الفجر, romanized: The Dawn) is an independent daily newspaper published in Abu Dhabi, United Arab Emirates. Founded in 1974 the daily is one of the oldest publications in the country.

== History and profile ==
Al Fajr was launched by Obaid Humaid Al Mazrooei in 1974. Mazrooei was also the first editor of the daily. The publisher of the paper is Dar Al Fajr Printing, Publishing and Advertising which was founded in 1975. The headquarters of the paper is in Abu Dhabi.

The daily, an independent publication, provides local, national and international news. In addition, the paper provides supplements for arts and women.

The newspaper is considered loyalist and pro-government. As of 2013 Sherif Al Bassel was the editor-in-chief of the daily.

The daily is a member of the Audit Bureau of Circulations for its circulation records. The reported circulation of Al Fajr in 1994 was 4,284 copies. Its estimated circulation in 2003 was 28,000 copies.
