= Democratic Forum for Labour and Liberties =

Democratic Forum for Labour and Liberties التكتل الديمقراطي من أجل العمل والحريات
- French name: Forum démocratique pour le travail et les libertés
- Abbreviation: Ettakatol
- President: Khalil Zaouia
- Founded: 9 April 1994; 32 years ago
- Legalized: 25 October 2002; 23 years ago
- Newspaper: Mouatinoun
- Ideology: Social democracy Secularism
- Political position: Centre-left
- European affiliation: Party of European Socialists (Observer)
- International affiliation: Progressive Alliance; Socialist International
- Colors: Light red
- Assembly of the Representatives of the People: 0 / 217

Website
- ettakatol.org

The Democratic Forum for Labour and Liberties (Arabic: التكتل الديمقراطي من أجل العمل والحريات, at-Takattul ad-Dīmuqrāṭī min ajl il-'Amal wal-Ḥurriyyāt; French: Forum démocratique pour le travail et les libertés), also referred to as Ettakatol or by its French acronym FDTL, is a social democratic political party in Tunisia. It was founded on 9 April 1994 and officially recognized on 25 October 2002. Its founder and Secretary-General is the radiologist Mustapha Ben Jafar.

== History ==
During the rule of Ben Ali, the FDTL played only a secondary role. It was a member of the opposition 18 October Coalition for Rights and Freedoms alongside the Progressive Democratic Party, the Communist Party of Tunisian Workers and some Islamists. Although participating in legislative elections, it could not win any seats in the Tunisian parliament. Ettakatol's secretary-general Ben Jafar attempted to run for the 2009 presidential election, but was barred from the race.

=== Elections of 2009 ===
In 2009, Ettakatol ran for the first time in the parliamentary elections, winning only 0.12% of the vote and no seats in the Chamber of Deputies.

For the presidential election held on the same day, the Mustapha Ben Jaafar announced his candidacy for the election. A new party leader who had not held elective congress at that time, Ben Jaafar defended his candidacy in an interview with Jeune Afrique.

He supported his candidacy on an analysis of lawyers on the constitutional amendment in July 2008. But Zuhair M'dhaffer, Minister Delegate to the Prime Minister for the Public Service and Administrative Development and former President of the Constitutional Council, insists that "the leader of a party has to be elected president by Congress, not by the founding body of the movement". However, Ben Jaafar said that "neither the constitution nor the electoral code, nor the law on political parties mention such a requirement" and that it depends on the rules of procedure of the parties.

On the occasion of its Ettakatol's first congress held on 29 and 30 May 2009, Mustapha Ben Jaafar was reconfirmed as secretary-general.

Ben Jaafar said his nomination confirmed by the Congress of the FDTL, especially for a "challenge to change the rules of the political game and break with the practices of another planet" while remaining open to dialogue, including with the party in power. He thinks that "failing to have equal means, [the candidates] should have the same chance to start" .

On 24 September, he was the last nominee to present his candidacy, saying that "there are people capable of assuming the highest political responsibilities [...] and the alternation of power is possible," his approach trying to "get Tunisians lethargy and resignation of the state in which they are".

His supporters gathered inside the Constitutional Council, it calls for the release of trade unionists convicted in the wake of the social movement of 2008 in the mining region of Redeyef. The Constitutional Council, however, invalidate the bid on the grounds that it does not meet the requirement that a candidate must be elected leader of his training for at least two years. Therefore, Ben Jaafar called 5 Oct to vote for Brahim who is the "only serious candidate," he said.

=== After the revolution ===
During the Tunisian Revolution 2010/11, Ettakatol developed into a main representative of the centre-left secular camp. The Forum relies mainly on the voluntary commitment of its grassroot members and its activities in social media. On 17 January 2011, Ettakatol's leader Ben Jafar was appointed Health Minister of the interim government by prime minister Mohamed Ghannouchi. Protests on the streets however continued against the unchanged prevalence of ministers from Ben Ali's old dominant RCD party. The freshly appointed three ministers of the Tunisian General Labour Union (UGTT) immediately reacted and resigned just a day later. The same day, Ben Jafar joined them refusing to take up his position in the transitional government.

In the Constituent Assembly election on 23 October 2011, Ettakatol won 20 of the 217 seats making it the fourth force in the Assembly. Subsequently, the FDTL came to an agreement with the two major parties, the Islamist Ennahda Movement and the secular Congress for the Republic (CPR), to share the three highest positions in state. Accordingly, Ben Jafar was voted Speaker of the Assembly on 22 November. In exchange, the Forum supported the election of CPR-leader Moncef Marzouki as interim President of the Republic, and the appointment of Ennahda's secretary-general Hamadi Jebali as Prime Minister.

Ettakatol was unanimously elected as a full member of the Socialist International at the congress held on 30 August 2012. The party held its second congress on 7 July 2013; Ben Jafar was reconfirmed as secretary-general.

The foundation of Nidaa Tounes in July 2013, led to a number of parliamentarians defecting from Ettakatol and other parties to join the new party. In the 2014 parliamentary election, Ettakatol lost all of its previous 20 seats except for one in the Kasserine electoral district, which was reallocated by the Elections Authority sanctioning Nidaa Tounes for irregularities by party members.

== Ideology ==
The FDTL is a member of the Socialist International and observer of the Party of European Socialists. Since 2007 the party has published an Arabic weekly newspaper entitled Mouatinoun (Citizens).
