= Ennahda =

Political party in Tunisia

Ennahda Movement حركة النهضة Hizbu Ḥarakatu n-Nahḍah Mouvement Ennahda
- President: Rached Ghannouchi
- General Secretary: Zied Ladhari
- Founder: Rached Ghannouchi (co-founder)
- Founded: 6 June 1981; 45 years ago
- Legalized: 1 March 2011
- Headquarters: 67, rue Oum Kalthoum; 1001 Tunis
- Newspaper: El-Fajr
- Ideology: Social conservatism Economic liberalism Islamic democracy Conservative democracy
- Political position: Centre-right to right-wing
- Religion: Sunni Islam
- Assembly of the Representatives of the People: 0 / 161

The Ennahda Movement (Arabic: حركة النهضة, romanized: Ḥarakatu n-Nahḍah; French: Mouvement Ennahdha), also known as the Renaissance Party or simply known as Ennahda, is a self-defined Islamic democratic political party in Tunisia.

Founded as the Movement of Islamic Tendency in 1981, Ennahda was inspired by the Egyptian Muslim Brotherhood and through the latter, to Ruhollah Khomeini's own propelled ideology of "Islamic Government".

In the wake of the 2011 Tunisian revolution and collapse of the government of Zine El Abidine Ben Ali, the Ennahda Movement Party was formed, and in the 2011 Tunisian Constituent Assembly election (the first free election in the country's history), won a plurality of 37% of the popular vote and formed the government. Uproar in the traditionally secular country over "Islamization" and assassinations of two secular politicians however, led to the 2013–14 Tunisian political crisis, and the party stepped down following the implementation of a new constitution in January 2014. The party came in second with 27.79% of the vote, in the 2014 Tunisian parliamentary election, forming a coalition government with the largest secular party, but did not offer or endorse a candidate in the November 2014 presidential election.

In 2018, lawyers and politicians accused Ennahda of forming a secret organisation that had infiltrated security forces and the judiciary. They also claimed the party was behind the 2013 assassinations of Chokri Belaid and Mohamed Brahmi, two progressive political leaders of the leftist Popular Front electoral alliance. Ennahda denied the accusations and accused the Popular Front of slandering and distorting Ennahda. It said that the Popular Front was exploiting the two assassination cases and using blood as an excuse to reach the government after failing to do so through democratic means.

== Ideology ==
In 2016, following 2011 and the "Arab Spring" mainstream media reports, journalist Robert F. Worth called it "the mildest and most democratic Islamist party in history." The Hudson Institute was skeptical, highlighting the adoption of the Velâyat-e Faqih by the movement's founder Rached Ghannouchi, who has remained its president since 1984.

Rached Ghannouchi says textually in his book: "The Islamic government is one in which: 1- supreme legislative authority is for the shari'a, which is the revealed law of Islam, which transcends all laws. (...)"

According to associate professor of political science Sebnem Gumuscu, there were competing views within the party about liberal democracy in its early years, but since the 1990s, liberal Islamists pulled Ennahda towards democratic principles.

== History ==
=== Early years ===
Succeeding a group known as Islamic Action, the party was founded under the name of "Movement of Islamic Tendency" (French: Mouvement de la Tendance Islamique (MTI), Arabic: حركة الاتجاه الإسلامي Ḥarakatu l-Ittijāhu l-Islāmī) in 1981. After the Tunisian bread riots in January 1984 the government suspected the MTI of involvement in the disturbances, and arrested many of its supporters. The MTI leaders had encouraged their followers to join in the riots, but the government produced no proof that they had organized them. The persecution of the MTI enhanced its reputation as an organization committed to helping the people. In 1989, it changed its name to Ḥarakat Ennahḍha.

The party has been described as one of many parties/movements in Muslim states "that grew up alongside the Iranian revolution", and it was originally inspired by the Egyptian Muslim Brotherhood. The group supported the 1979 takeover of the U.S. embassy in Tehran, claiming that "It was not an embassy, but a spy centre". Their influence in 1984 was such that, according to Robin Wright, a British journalist living in Tunisia, stated that the Islamic Tendency was "the single most threatening opposition force in Tunis. One word from the fundamentalists will close down the campus or start a demonstration."

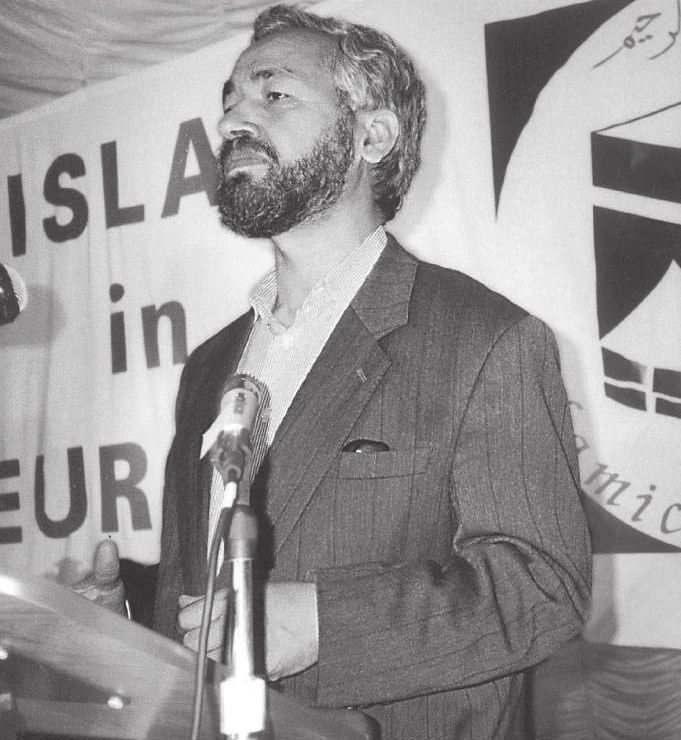
Rached Ghannouchi speaking at an Islamist rally around 1980.

Although traditionally shaped by the thinking of Islamist thinkers Sayyid Qutb and Maududi, the party began to be described as "moderate Islamist" in the 1980s when it advocated democracy and a "Tunisian" form of Islamism recognizing political pluralism and a "dialogue" with the West. Its main leader Rached Ghannouchi, has been criticized for calling for jihad against Israel and, according to Martin Kramer on 1994, "openly threatened U.S. interests, supported Iraq against the United States and campaigned against the Arab-Israeli peace process". Others described him as "widely considered ... a moderate who believes that Islam and democracy are compatible".

In the 1989 elections, President Ben Ali banned the party from participating but allowed some members to run as independents. These received between 10% and 17% of the vote nationally according to official figures of the regime, and despite what some observers thought was "widespread fraud". Allegedly surprised by Ennahda's popularity, two years later Ben Ali banned the movement and jailed 25,000 activists. Many Ennahda members went into exile.

Ennahda's newspaper Al-Fajr was banned in Tunisia and its editor, Hamadi Jebali, was sentenced to sixteen years imprisonment in 1992 for membership in the un-authorized organisation and for "aggression with the intention of changing the nature of the state". The Arabic language television station El Zaytouna is believed to be connected with Ennahda. The party was strongly repressed in the late 1980s and early 1990s and almost completely absent from Tunisia from 1992 until the post-revolutionary period. "Tens of thousands" of Islamists were imprisoned or exiled during this time.

=== Revolution and return to political scene ===
In the wake of the Tunisian Revolution, thousands of people welcomed Rached Ghannouchi on his return to Tunis. The party was described as moving "quickly to carve out a place" in the Tunisian political scene, "taking part in demonstrations and meeting with the prime minister." Earlier Ghannouchi announced that the party had "signed a shared statement of principles with the other Tunisian opposition groups". The New York Times reported mixed predictions among Tunisians for the party's success, with some believing the party would enjoy support in the inland part of Tunisia, but others saying Tunisia was "too secular" for the Ennahda Party to gain broad support. On 22 January 2011, in an interview with Al Jazeera TV, Rached Ghannouchi confirmed that he is against an Islamic Caliphate, and supports democracy instead, unlike Hizb ut-Tahrir, (whom Ghannouchi accuses of exporting a distorted understanding of Islam).

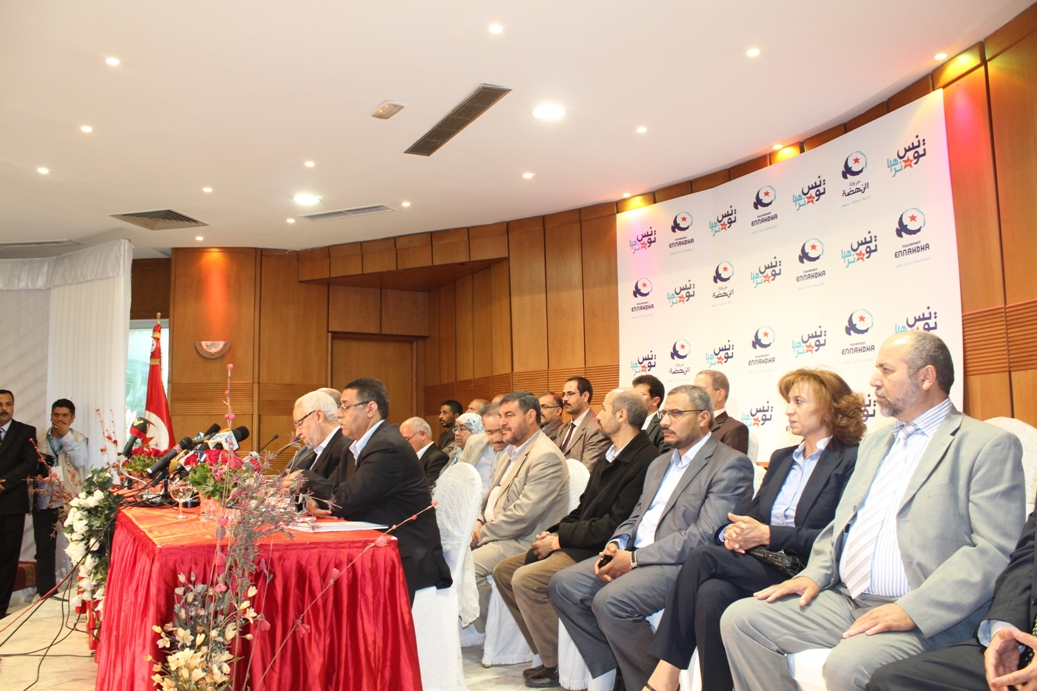
Members of the Ennahda Party, 2011

The party was legalised on 1 March 2011. A March 2011 opinion poll found the Ennahda Party ranked first among political parties in Tunisia with 29%, followed by the Progressive Democratic Party at 12.3% and the Ettajdid Movement at 7.1%. It was also found that 61.4% of Tunisians "ignore political parties in the country." This success has caused some secularist to call for the postponing of elections in what many described as "secularism extremism" who were hellbent on denying Ennahda forming the government despite what election observers described as free and fair democratic process.

In May 2011, Ennahda's General Secretary Hamadi Jebali traveled to Washington, D.C., on the invitation of the Center for the Study of Islam and Democracy He also met U.S. Senators John McCain and Joe Lieberman.

Ennahda's leaders have been described as "highly sensitive to the fears among other West about Islamic party". "We are not an Islamist party, we are an Islamic party, that also gets its bearings by the principles of the Quran." Moreover, he named Turkey a model, regarding the relation of state and religion, and compared the party's Islamic democratic ideology to Christian democracy in Italy and Germany.

On a press conference in June 2011, the Ennahda Party presented itself as modern and democratic and introduced a female member who wore a headscarf and a member who didn't, and announced the launching of a youth wing. Süddeutsche Zeitung noted that, unlike leftist parties of Tunisia, the moderately Islamic party is not against a market economy.

On 31 December 2021, Ennahda claimed in a statement that the party's Vice President and member of the Tunisian parliament, Noureddine Bhiri, had been abducted by “security forces with civilian clothes and taken to an unknown destination.” On 2 January 2022, AFP reported that Bhiri had been rushed to intensive care at a hospital in the northern town Bizerte and was in a "critical condition". The speaker of Tunisia's suspended parliament, Rached Ghannouchi wrote to President Kais Saied asking him to reveal Bhiri's whereabouts and condition.

=== 2011 Constituent Assembly election ===
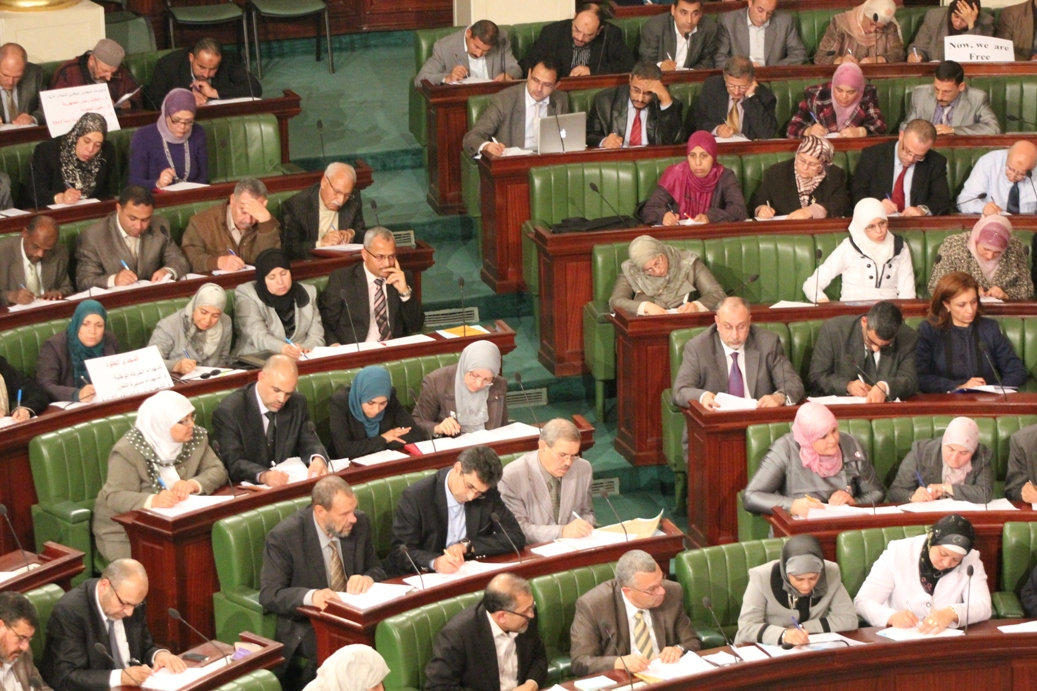
Ennahda members in the Constituent Assembly

Ahead of the Constituent Assembly election on 23 October 2011, the party conducted extensive electoral campaign, extensively providing potential voters, especially from the lower class, with promotional gifts, meals for the end of Ramadan feasts, and sponsoring events.

In the 23 October 2011 Tunisian Constituent Assembly election, the first free election in the country's history with a turn out of 51.1% of all eligible voters, the Ennahda Party won 37.04% of the vote (more than the next four biggest vote-getters combined) and 89 of the 217 seats, making it by far the strongest party in the legislature.

According to scholar Noah Feldman, rather than being a "puzzling disappointment for the forces of democracy", the Ennahda victory is a natural outcome of inevitable differences between revolution's leaders and the fact that "Tunisians see Islam as a defining feature of their personal and political identities." Rached Ghannouchi, the party's leader was one of the few "voices of resistance to the regime in the last 20 years."

Subsequently, it agreed with the two runners-up, the centre-left secular Congress for the Republic (CPR) and Ettakatol, to co-operate in the Assembly and to share the three highest positions in state. Accordingly, Ennahda supported the election of Ettakatol's secretary-general Mustapha Ben Jafar as President of the Constituent Assembly, and of CPR-leader Moncef Marzouki as Interim President of the Republic. The latter, in exchange, immediately appointed Ennahda's secretary-general Hamadi Jebali as Prime Minister.

=== 2011–2014 Troika government ===
Ennahda was part of the Troika government, along with two left-wing parties. Ettakatol and CPR. The government was criticized for mediocre economic performance, not stimulating the tourism industry, poor relations with Tunisia's biggest trading partner France. In particular it was criticized for not monitoring and controlling radical Islamists (such as Ansar al-Sharia) who were blamed for, among other things, attempting to Islamise the country, the 2012 ransacking and burning of the American embassy.

The Troika government faced many challenges domestically and regionally including reviving an economy that had contracted by 1.9% after the Revolution, rising unemployment, managing the influx of over a million Libyan refugees due to the Libyan war, and a wave of social protests. The Troika government reasserted state control over 80 percent of the mosques that had been taken over by extremists in the chaotic period immediately after the revolution.

On 19 February 2013, following the assassination of Chokri Belaid and ensuing protests, Prime Minister Hamadi Jebali resigned from his office, a move which was deemed unprecedented by analysts. The move followed his attempt to form a technocratic government. Ennahda, however, rejected his resignation insisting on a government of politicians and Jebali formally resigned after a meeting with President Moncef Marzouki saying it was in the best interests of the country. He said: "I promised if my initiative did not succeed I would resign as head of the government, and this is what I am doing following my meeting with the president. Today there is a great disappointment among the people and we must regain their trust and this resignation is a first step."

Party leader Rached Ghannouchi then suggested a government of politicians and technocrats, while Jebali suggested that if he was tasked with forming a new government it would have to include non-partisan ministers and a variety of political representation that would lead to a new election. Unnamed opposition figures welcomed the resignation. The same day, Standard & Poor's downgraded Tunisia's credit rating. However, the IMF said that it was still in talks for a US$1.78 billion loan to the country. On 14 March 2013, Ali Larayedh was elected as Ennahda's new Secretary General and officially took over as Tunisia's new Prime Minister.

Ennahda ceded control of key ministries to technocrats, including foreign affairs, defence and the interior. Ennahda made up 28% of the government, down from 40% in the previous coalition, with independents forming 48% of the new cabinet.

After stabilization of the political situation, the assassination of Mohamed Brahmi, member of the Assembly, in July 2013, led to turmoil and political deadlock. Following a National Dialogue and recognizing the continued need for national unity, on 5 October a "road map" was signed, and in January 2014, Ennahda, CPR and Ettakattol stepped down and handed power to a caretaker technocratic government, led by Mehdi Jomaa, to prepare and organize the second democratic elections. Ghanouchi worked with secularist leader Beji Caid Essebsi to forge a compromise agreement, both were heavily criticized by their party rank and file and Ghanouchi received agreement from the Ennahda shura council after threatening to resign. Outside observers called it a "model transition".

In January 2014, after the new Tunisian Constitution was adopted by popular vote, Ennahda came second in the October 2014 parliamentary election with 27.79% of the popular vote and formed a coalition government with the larger secularist party Nidaa Tounes.

Ennahda did not put forward or endorse any candidate for the November 2014 presidential election. Ghanouchi "hinted broadly" that he personally supported Beji Caid Essebsi, (who won with over 55% of the vote).

=== 2014–present ===
In the 2014 Tunisian parliamentary election, Ennahda candidate Jamilia Ksiksi became Tunisia's first black female MP.

Ennahda became the largest party in parliament in the 2019 election, but with just 52 of 217 seats, Ennahda attempted to court supporters of Kais Saied, the first-round winner of the presidential elections. Ennahda not only backed Saied in the runoff elections, but also attempted to persuade Saied voters that Ennahda was their best opportunity for building a government supportive of a Saied president. In February 2020 Ennahdha issued an official statement saying it will grant confidence to the Fakhfakh Cabinet. The Fakhfakh administration had 32 members, six of whom were from Ennahda.

In 2021, Ennahda faced widespread public anger as the country experienced a political crisis due to 2021 Tunisian protests. President Kais Saied dismissed the government and froze parliament, a move labeled a coup by Parliament Speaker Rached Ghannouchi.

The Tunisian government has detained at least 17 current or former members of the party, including its head, and closed its offices around the nation since December 2022. Tunisian authorities apprehended Ghannouchi and searched his headquarters in April 2023.

Ennahda announced on the occasion of its 42nd anniversary that it would be unable to hold its eleventh congress due to "oppressive retaliatory measures taken by the authorities against the party's leader, some of its leaders, and its headquarters, which hinder the party's work and institutions.

== Chairmen ==
During its first ten years of existence, presidency of Ennahda changed very often, while its leading figure Rached Ghannouchi was jailed until 1984 and then again in 1987. After going to exile he remained the party's "intellectual leader". In November 1991 he also took back the formal presidency.

Following is a list of all former presidents of the party:

- June–July 1981: Abderraouf Bouabi
- July–October 1981: Fadhel Beldi
- October 1981 – August 1984: Hamadi Jebali
- November 1984 – August 1987: Rached Ghannouchi
- August 1987 – April 1988: Salah Karker
- April–October 1988: Jamel Aoui
- October 1988 – March 1991: Sadok Chourou
- March 1991: Mohamed Kaloui
- March 1991: Mohamed Akrout
- April–June 1991: Mohamed Ben Salem
- June–September 1991: Habib Ellouze
- October 1991: Noureddine Arbaoui
- October –November 1991: Walid Bennani
- since November 1991: Rached Ghannouchi

== Political positions ==
In the wake of the compromise worked out by Ghanouchi and Beji Caid Essebsi, the party (or at least its leader), has been complimented for it willingness to compromise, protecting Tunisia's democracy and civil peace from Egyptian style violence. However some Islamists see the party as having lost an opportunity to reverse the "social framework" of secularism in the country.

The party is generally described as socially centrist with mild support for economic liberalism and has been compared to European Christian democrats. However, liberals accuse its leaders of "doublespeak" in this regard. The party wishes to revise the strong secular, Arab nationalist, and socialist principles that predominate among the other parties, and instead allow Islam into public life and be more accommodating to other viewpoints such as closer relations with the West and greater economic freedom. The party currently rejects radical Islamism as a form of governance appropriate for Tunisia, nevertheless Islam remains an important feature of the party; in a debate with a secular opponent Ghannouchi stated, "Why are we put in the same place as a model that is far from our thought, like the Taliban or the Saudi model, while there are other successful Islamic models that are close to us, like the Turkish, the Malaysian, and the Indonesian models; models that combine Islam and modernity?"

Political scientist Riadh Sidaoui explains that the Ennahda leader models his approach on the moderate Islamism of Turkey; he says: "The leadership was forced into exile in London for a long time [because of harassment by Tunisian police] and understood about the need to have a balanced outlook... No one wants a repeat of the 1991 Algerian scenario."

On 13 November 2011, the party's secretary-general Hamadi Jebali held a joint rally in Sousse together with a parliamentary deputy of the Palestinian Hamas party. Jebali referred to the occasion as "a divine moment in a new state, and in, hopefully, a 6th caliphate," and that "the liberation of Tunisia will, God willing, bring about the liberation of Jerusalem." While the tone was said do be sharply in contrast to official statements of the party, Jebali was appointed Prime Minister of Tunisia a mere month later.

When in January 2012, Hamas leadership arrived for another visit to Tunisia, people at the airport were heard shouting "Kill the Jews." Tunisian Jews said Ennahda leadership was slow to condemn the shouting.

Ahmed Ibrahim of the Tunisian Democratic Modernist Pole political bloc complained to a foreign journalist that Ennahda appears "soft" on television, "but in the mosques, it is completely different. Some of them are calling for jihad". The general manager of Al Arabiya wrote an editorial expressing the opinion that Ennahda is fundamentally a conservative Islamist party with a moderate leadership. Ennahda has been described as a mixed bag with moderate top layers and a base defined by "a distinctly fundamentalist tilt".

Although the party has expressed support for women's rights and equality of civil rights between men and women, the party chose to place only two women at first position out of 33 regional lists for the Tunisian Constituent Assembly. Ghannouchi noted that women have not held any de facto leadership positions under Ben Ali's governments and that it is a reality that only a few women are currently suited to leadership posts.

The party is more moderate in urbanized areas such as Tunis, where secular and socially liberal beliefs predominate. However, Ennahda's compromises and abandoning of political Islam has made their core supporters lose faith in them. Perhaps as a result, in 2018, the party declared that it would vote down a bill that would end gender discrimination and implement inheritance equality between men and women, justifying its position because the bill proposed by the Tunisian president Beji Caid Essebsi is against the Quran and the beliefs of Tunisian people. The position sparked outrage among Tunisian progressives and liberals who accused the party of lying about its embrace of democracy, and turning back to its Islamic radical origins.

According to a 2020 study, members of parliament in the Ennahda movement who had lived abroad in secular democracies had more liberal voting records than their counterparts who had only lived in Tunisia.

=== Homosexuality ===
The party and its leaders have taken very hostile positions against homosexuality. In 2012, Samir Dilou, then minister of human rights and leader of Ennahda, said the LGBT people have no right to free speech, and they should respect the religion and heritage of Tunisia, he also said that homosexuality is a sexual perversion and a mental illness. Amnesty International said that it was deeply disappointed by the comments of Dilou, especially since his portfolio is human rights.

The presidential candidate of Ennahda in 2019, Abdelfattah Mourou, stated that homosexuality is a personal choice and that individual freedoms should be respected, but at the same time announced his support for the continuation of criminalization of homosexuality in Tunisia, where sodomy is punished by 3 years of imprisonment.

In 2021, Fathi Layouni, Ennahda mayor of Le Kram, declared to a local radio station that the natural place for homosexuals is either prisons or psychiatric hospitals and that they are forbidden from entering his city. He also demanded the closure of the Association Shams, which is a Tunisian organization for LGBT rights.

== Election results ==
Election year	# of total votes	% of overall vote	# of seats	Government
Constituent Assembly of Tunisia
2011	1,501,320	37.04%	89 / 217	Coalition(2011–2014)
2011	1,501,320	37.04%	89 / 217	Technocratic Government (2014–2015)
Assembly of the Representatives of the People
2014	947,034	27.79%	69 / 217	Coalition
2019	561,132	19.63%	52 / 217	Coalition

== See also ==
- List of Islamic political parties
