= Hamadi Jebali =

Tunisian politician (born 1949)

His Excellency Hamadi Jebali
- حمادي الجبالي
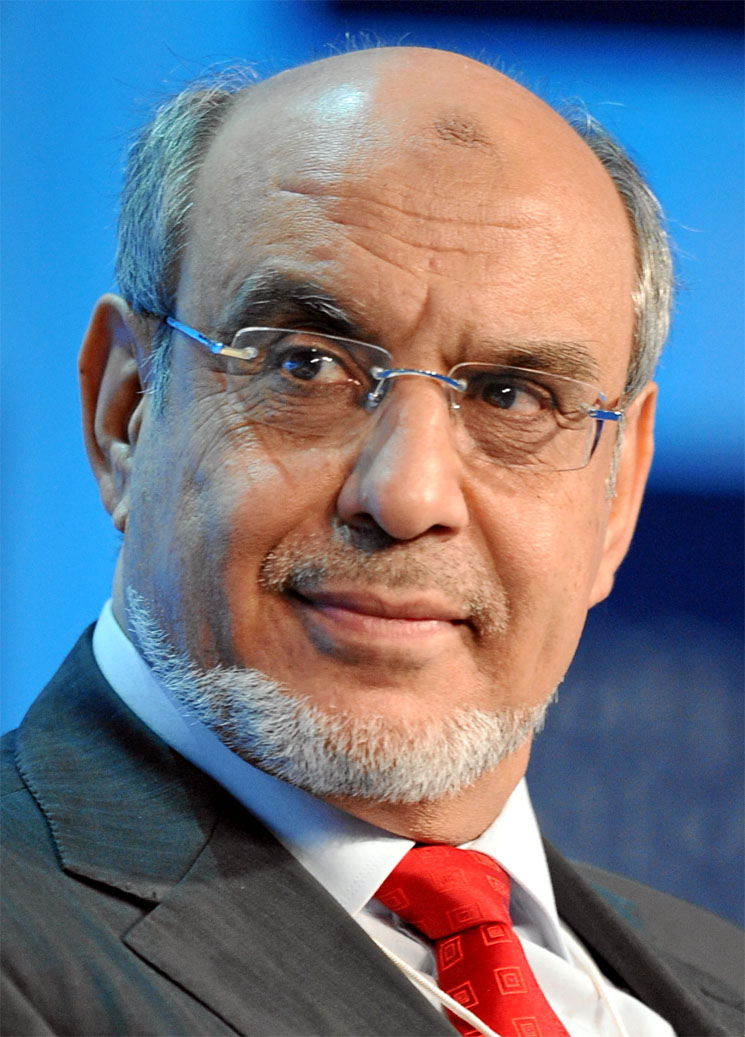
- Jebali in 2012

Prime Minister of Tunisia
- In office 24 December 2011 – 13 March 2013
- President: Moncef Marzouki
- Preceded by: Beji Caid Essebsi
- Succeeded by: Ali Laarayedh

Secretary General of the Ennahda Movement
- In office 6 June 1981 – 22 February 2013
- Leader: Rashid al-Ghannushi
- Preceded by: Position established
- Succeeded by: Ali Laarayedh

Personal details
- Born: 12 January 1949 (age 77) Sousse, Tunisia
- Party: Ennahda Movement (until 2014)
- Education: Tunis University; University of Paris; Conservatoire national des arts et métiers

Hamadi Jebali (Arabic: حمادي الجبالي, Ḥammādī al-Jibālī; born 12 January 1949) is a Tunisian engineer, politician, and journalist who was prime minister of Tunisia from December 2011 to March 2013. He was the Secretary-General of the Ennahda Movement, a moderate Islamic party in Tunisia, until he left his party in December 2014 in the course of the 2014 Tunisian presidential election.

== Early life, education and professional life ==
Born in Sousse in 1949, Jebali received his bachelor's degree in mechanical engineering from the Tunis University and added a masters programme in photovoltaic engineering at the Conservatoire national des arts et métiers in Paris, France. As a specialist in solar energy and wind power, he founded his own enterprise in Sousse.

== Personal life ==
Hamadi Jebali comes from a family of six children: four girls and two boys. including his brother, Ali Jebali, he is a well-known figure in Tunisia, active in professional and public affairs. In 1957, his father, a carpenter in Sousse and a staunch Youssefist, was arrested and imprisoned; he helped his family bring a modest supply basket to his father at Habs Al Mokhtar prison.

== Political and journalistic activity ==
In 1981 he became involved with Tunisia's Islamist movement, then called Movement of the Islamic Tendency. He was director and editor-in-chief of Al-Fajr (Dawn), the former weekly newspaper of the Islamist Ennahda Party. Moreover, he served as longtime member of the party's executive council and remains secretary-general of Ennahda.

== Criminal prosecution and imprisonment ==
In June 1990, Al-Fajr published an article by Rashid al-Ghannushi called "The people of the State or the State of the People?" Jebali was made responsible for the publication and received a suspended sentence and a 1,500 dinars fine for the offences of "encouraging violation of the law" and "calling for insurrection". In November 1990, the Islamist newspaper contained an essay by the lawyer Mohammed Nouri, entitled "When will military courts, serving as special courts, be abolished?" This time, a military court sentenced Hamadi Jebali to one year in prison for "defamation of a judicial institution".

In May 1992 the government claimed that it had detected plans for a coup d'état by Ennahda, which had allegedly plotted to kill President Ben Ali and establish an Islamic state. In August 1992, Jebali, along with 170 other sympathisers of Ennahda, was charged with "attempted overthrow". Jebali protested that he had no knowledge of the plot's existence, and asserted that he had been tortured, presenting marks on his body for evidence. The trial was classified as unfair by observers for Human Rights Watch, the Lawyer's Committee for Human Rights, and Amnesty International, the latter of which named Jebali a prisoner of conscience. Eventually, on 28 August 1992 Hamadi Jebali was sentenced to a prison term of 16 years for "membership in an illegal organisation" and "attempted change of the nature of the state". The Court of Cassation confirmed the verdict.

The conditions of his imprisonment were harsh. More than ten of the 15 years that Jebali spent, were in solitary confinement. Hamadi Jebali engaged in several hunger strikes to protest against the conditions and his conviction. Two of them lasted for 36 days each. In February 2006, on the occasion of the 50th anniversary of Tunisia's independence, Jebali was conditionally released.

== Post-revolution and Prime Minister ==
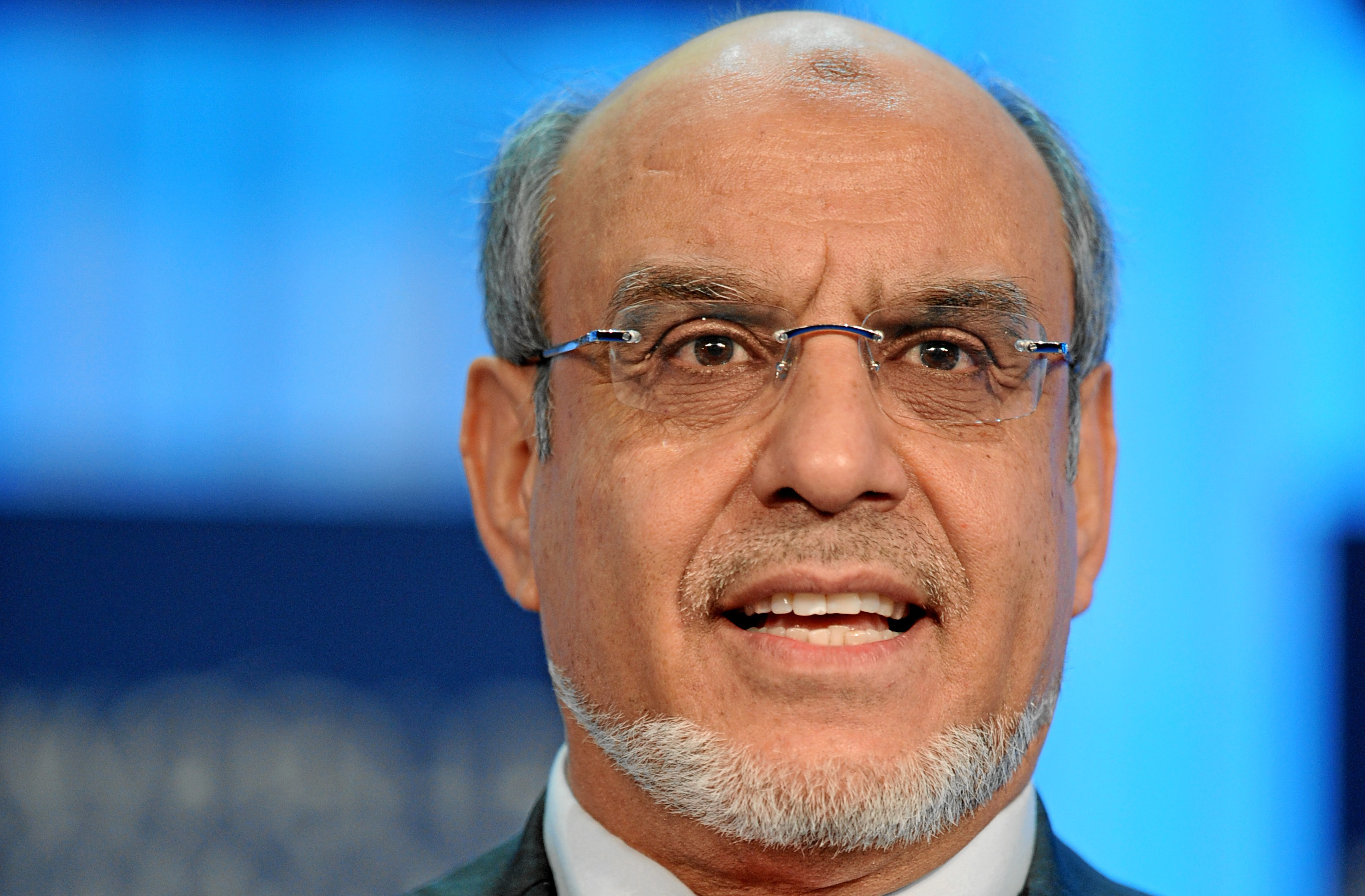
Jebali during the WEF 2012

Following the Tunisian revolution in January 2011, Ennahda was legalised. Since then, Hamadi Jebali has been present in public as the party's secretary-general and spokesman. In May 2011, he went to Washington, D.C. in the US at the invitation of the Center for the Study of Islam and Democracy. He also met U.S. Senators John McCain and Joe Lieberman.

Ensuing Ennahda's success in the Constituent Assembly election on 23 October 2011, the party nominated him as its candidate for prime minister. Jebali is considered a proponent of the reformist wing of his party.

Interim President Moncef Marzouki appointed Jebali as Prime Minister of Tunisia on 14 December 2011. He presented his government on 20 December. He officially took office on 24 December.

On 19 February 2013, he resigned from his office. The move followed his attempt to form a technocratic government following the assassination of Chokri Belaid and ensuing protests against the alleged Islamisation of the country. Ennahda, however, rejected his resignation insisting on a government of politicians and Jebali formally resigned after a meeting with President Moncef Marzouki saying it was in the best interests of the country. He said: "I promised if my initiative did not succeed I would resign as head of the government, and this is what I am doing following my meeting with the president. Today there is a great disappointment among the people and we must regain their trust and this resignation is a first step." Party leader Rachid Ghannouchi then suggested a government of politicians and technocrats, while Jebali suggested that if he was tasked with forming a new government it would have to include non-partisan ministers and a variety of political representation that would lead to a new election. Unnamed opposition figures welcomed the resignation. The same day, Standard & Poor downgraded Tunisia's credit rating. However, the IMF said that it was still in talks for a US$1.78 billion loan to the country.

After urging his party without success to support the interim president Moncef Marzouki in the presidential election of 2014, he left Ennahda on 10 December 2014. In January 2015, he refused to join the new party of the losing presidential candidate Marzouki but did not rule out founding a party of his own.

Party political offices
New political party	he quit as Secretary General of the Ennahda Movement; 2013	Succeeded by Ali Laarayedh
Political offices
Preceded by Béji Caïd Essebsi as Prime Minister	Prime Minister of Tunisia; 2011–2013	Succeeded by Ali Laarayedh
