= Antalya Diplomacy Forum =

Annual conference on international diplomacy

- Formation: 2020
- Type: Panel forum
- Legal status: Non-profit foundation
- Purpose: Diplomacy
- Location: Antalya, Turkey
- Region served: Worldwide
- Methods: Host conferences and meetings
- Official language: English
- Website: antalyadf.org/en/adf-english

The Antalya Diplomacy Forum (ADF) is an annual conference on international diplomacy that is held in Antalya, Turkey since 2021. During the forum, ideas and views on diplomacy, policy and business are exchanged by policy makers, diplomats and academics.

The meeting brings together some 3,000 participants for up to three days to discuss global issues across several sessions.

== History ==
The Antalya Diplomacy Forum was founded by the Turkish Foreign Minister Mevlüt Çavuşoğlu and is aimed at heads of state and government, foreign ministers and high-ranking representatives of the international organization as well as representatives from business, science, civil society and the media.

The first meeting was originally planned to be held in March 2020, but was postponed due to the COVID-19 pandemic.

On 10 March 2022, Russian Foreign Minister Sergei Lavrov, Ukrainian Foreign Minister Dmytro Kuleba and Turkey's Foreign Minister Mevlüt Çavuşoğlu met for the first high-level talks since the 2022 Russian invasion of Ukraine in Antalya Diplomacy Forum within the framework of Russia–Ukraine peace negotiations.

== Purpose ==
At this forum, under the theme of "Recoding Diplomacy", senior politicians, diplomats, military and security experts from up to 75 countries participate to discuss the current issues in diplomacy and energy policies.

The intention of the conference is to address the topical main global issues and to debate and analyze the challenges in the present and the future in line with the concept of networked security. A focal point of the conference is the discussion and the exchange of views on the development of the transatlantic relations as well as European and global security in the 21st century.

The conference is organized privately and therefore not an official government event. It is used exclusively for discussion; an authorization for binding intergovernmental decisions does not exist. Furthermore, there is – contrary to usual conventions – no common final communiqué. The high-level meeting is also used to discrete background discussions between the participants. ADF has partnerships with the Atlantic Council, Mexican Council on Foreign Relations, Munich Security Conference and RSIS.

== Editions ==
=== 2021 ===
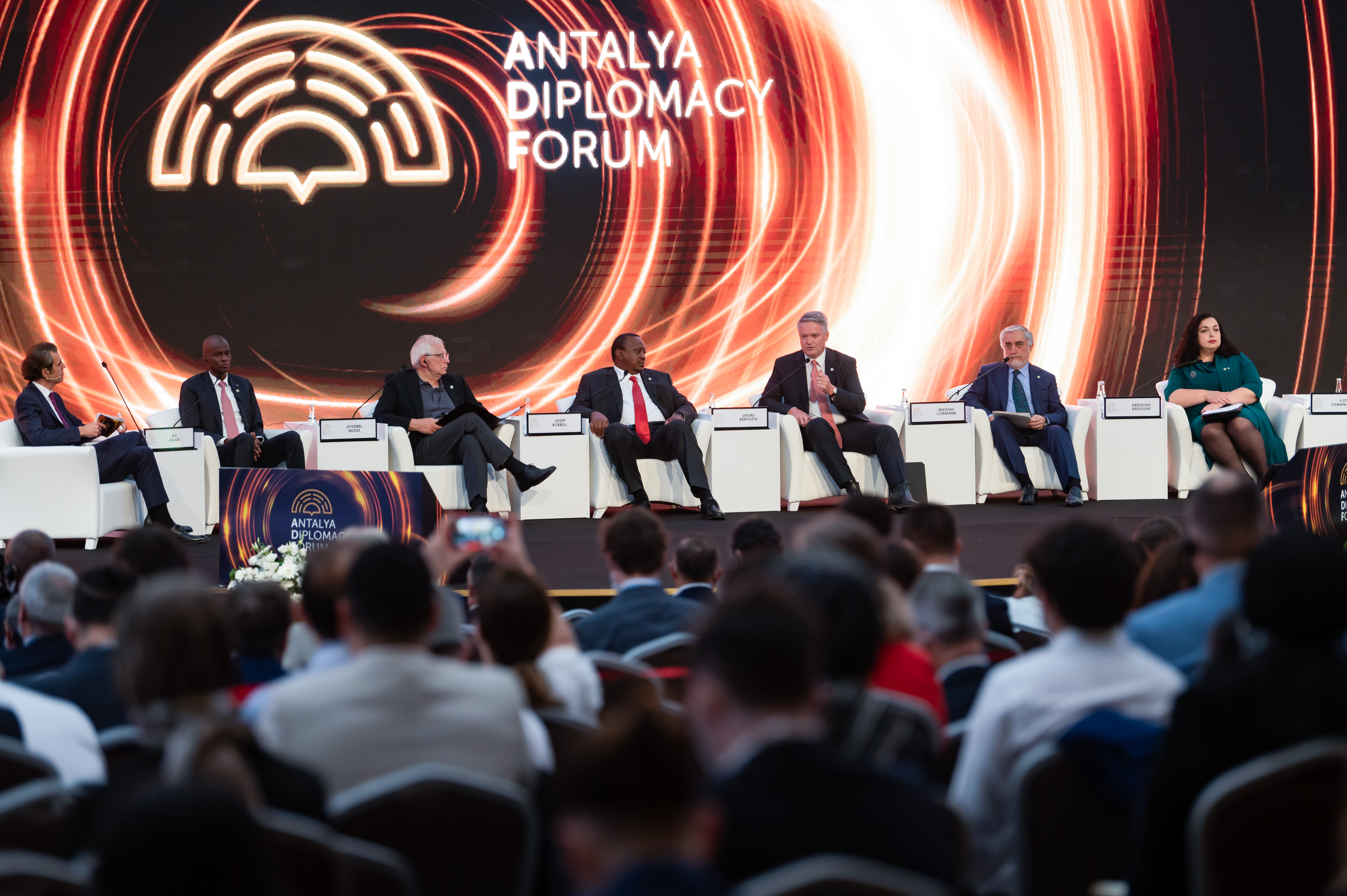
2021 panel with EU High Representative Borrell, OECD Secretary General Cormann and presidents from Haiti, Kosovo, Kenya and Afghanistan

The meeting was originally planned to be held in March 2020, but was postponed due to the COVID-19 pandemic.

A total of 11 heads of state and government, 45 foreign ministers, and attendance at ministerial level were part of the forum. Additionally, the event was attended by about 60 representatives of international organisations and high-level personalities, guests from the business and academic world, and 256 young people in total, including undergraduate, graduate, and doctoral students from more than 50 universities.

Two leaders' sessions, 15 panels, 25 side events, including ADF Talks, and two youth forums were organised.

=== 2022 ===
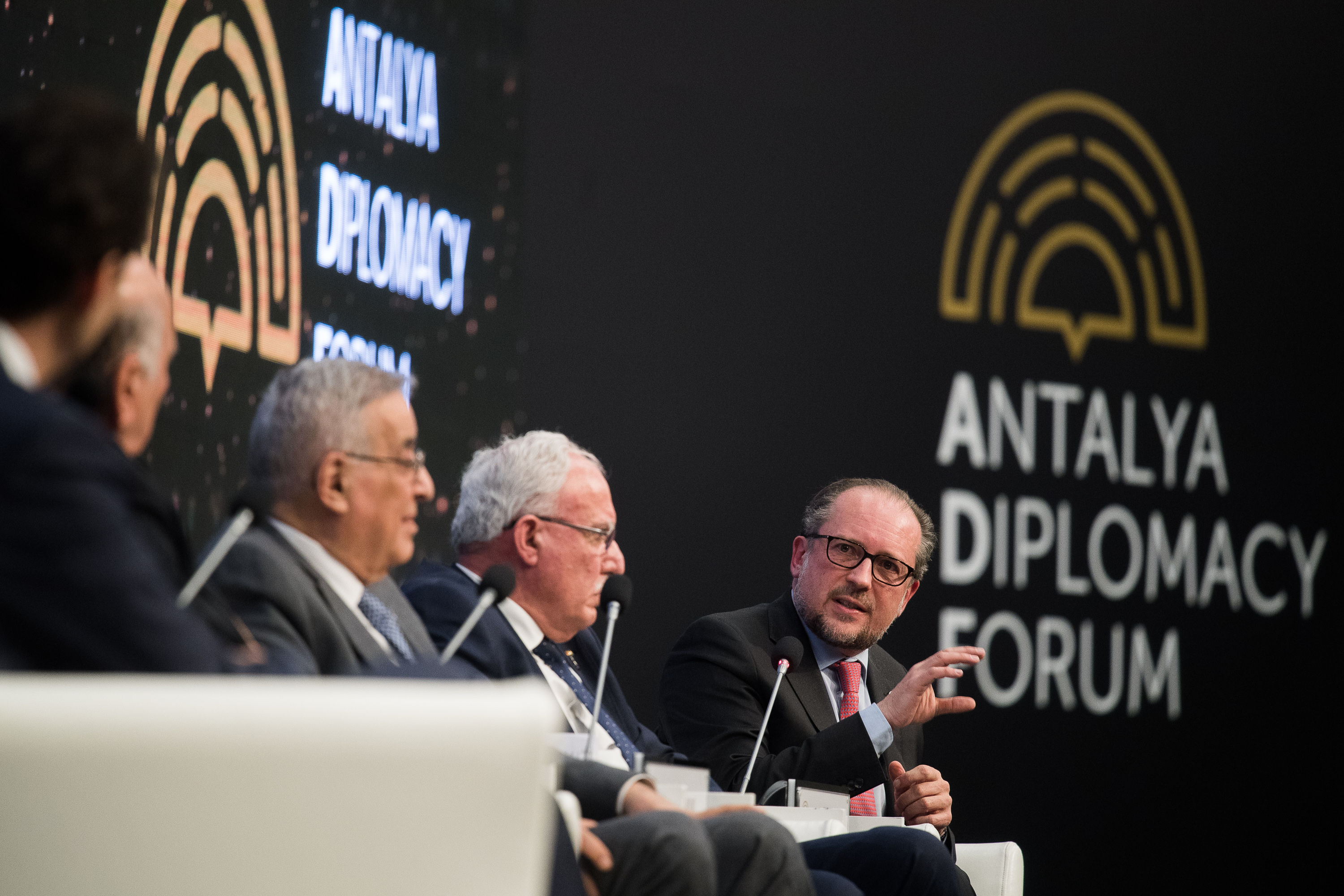
2022 panel with foreign ministers of Austria, Iraq and Lebanon

The 2022 edition of the forum took place in 11–13 March, under the overarching theme of "Recoding Diplomacy". A total of 17 heads of state and government, 80 foreign ministers and 39 representatives of international organisations were present.

The panels that took place were named as follows:

- Recoding Diplomacy
- Democratic Governance
- Leadership and Diplomacy
- Energy Security
- AI, Metaverse and all else
- Fighting Racism and Discrimination
- A Strategic Autonomy for Europe?
- Development in Africa
- Latin America and the Caribbean
- Cooperation and Competition in the Asia-Pacific
- Afghanistan
- Confronting Disinformation
- Irregular Migration
- Regional Cooperation in the Middle East
- Countering Terrorism
- Empowering Women
- Resolution of Maritime Disputes
- Green Economy
- Climate Change & Energy transition
- Revisiting Security in Europe

=== 2024 ===
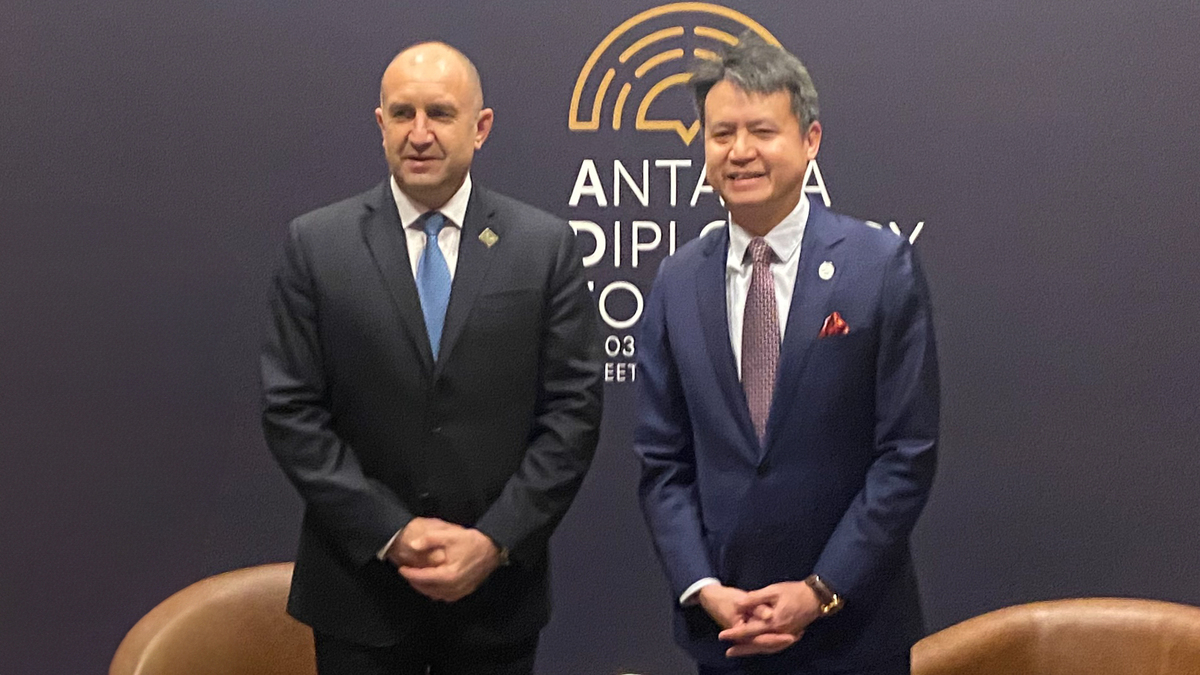
Meeting between Bulgarian President Rumen Radev and WIPO Director General Daren Tang on the sidelines of the forum

The third edition was originally planned to be held from 10 to 12 March 2023 with the theme of "Effective Diplomacy for Peace and Order". It was initially postponed to the last quarter of the year due to the 2023 Türkiye–Syria earthquake, and was later postponed to 1–3 March 2024.

The theme of the 2024 Forum was “Advancing Diplomacy in Times of Turmoil”.

=== 2026 ===
The fifth Antalya Diplomacy Forum took place from 17 to 19 April 2026 at the NEST Congress and Exhibition Centre in Belek, Antalya, under the theme "Mapping Tomorrow, Managing Uncertainties." Held under the auspices of President Recep Tayyip Erdoğan and hosted by Foreign Minister Hakan Fidan, the event brought together around 5,000 participants from over 150 countries, including more than 20 heads of state and government and over 50 ministers, to discuss geopolitical shifts, trade barriers, and multilateral cooperation across more than 40 panels.

== See also ==
- Diplomacy
- International relations
- Asian Leadership Conference
- Eurofi
- European Business Summit
- International Transport Forum
- World Knowledge Forum
