= The Leadership Conference =

The Leadership Conference may refer to:

- Leadership Conference on Civil and Human Rights
- Southern Christian Leadership Conference
- Leadership Conference of Women Religious
- Asian Leadership Conference
