= Asian Leadership Conference =

Annual conference in South Korea

- Formation: 2005
- Type: Conference
- Headquarters: Seoul, South Korea
- Region served: Asia, Worldwide
- Official language: English
- Parent organization: The Chosunilbo
- Website: www.alcchosun.com

The Asian Leadership Conference (ALC) is an annual international conference hosted in Seoul, South Korea, by The Chosun Ilbo, a major Korean daily newspaper. The inaugural conference was in March 2005. The conference addresses important issues in Asia and the world. The conference hosted over one hundred and fifty speakers and over one thousand guests.

== Origin ==
The inaugural conference was convened after the 2004 Indian Ocean tsunami with the theme, Cooperation and Rebuilding after the Tsunami. The ChosunIlbo proposed that South Korea, after overcoming extreme poverty and political turmoil, should take a leading role in the post tsunami period. Korea needed to be a model and provide the vision for future development. While the conference was initially a forum for Asian issues, it developed into an international event finding commonality in political, economic, and social, environmental topics.

== 2019 ==
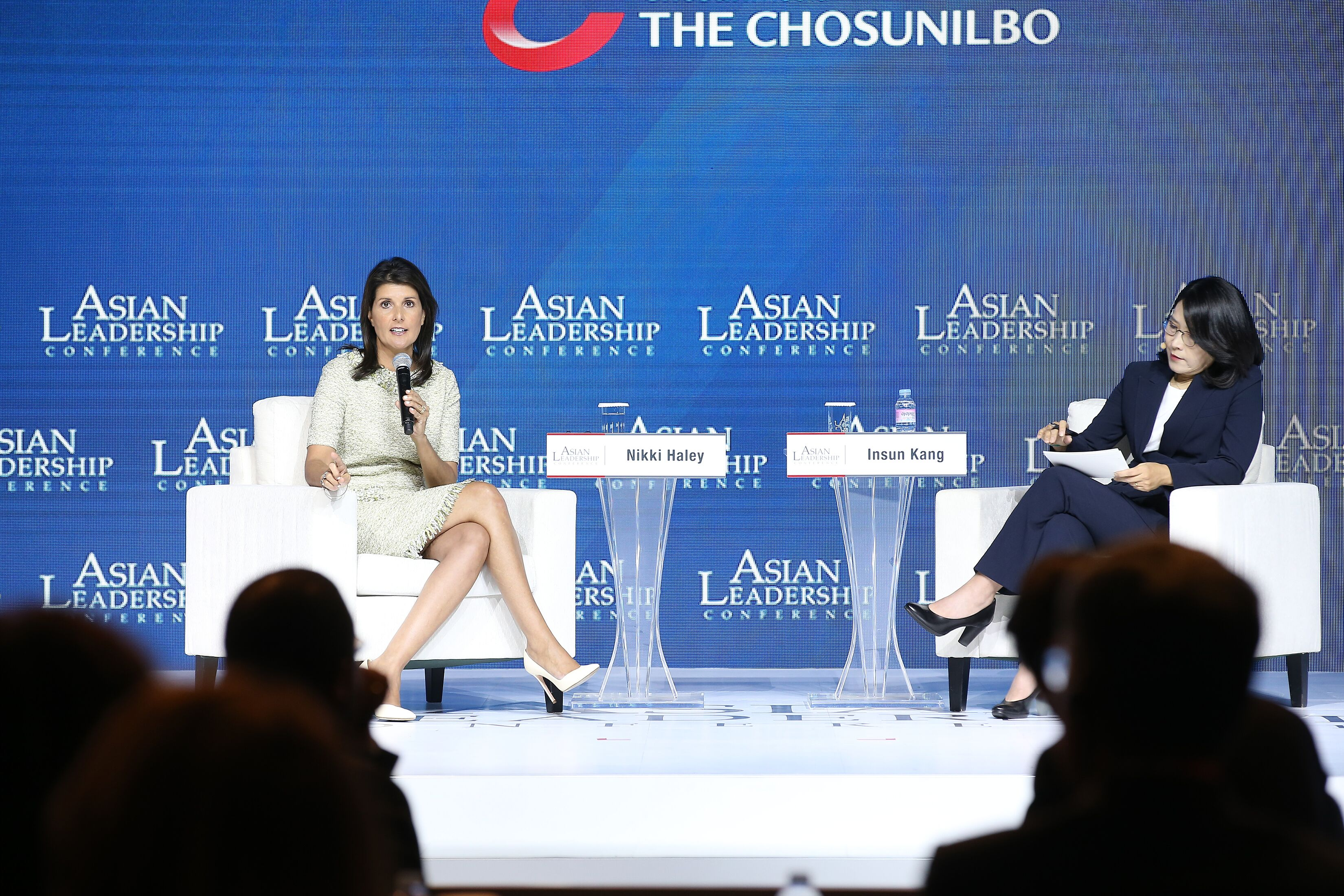
Nikki Haley and Insun Kang (Washington Bureau Chief of the Chosunilbo) discussing the future of US-South Korea Alliance.

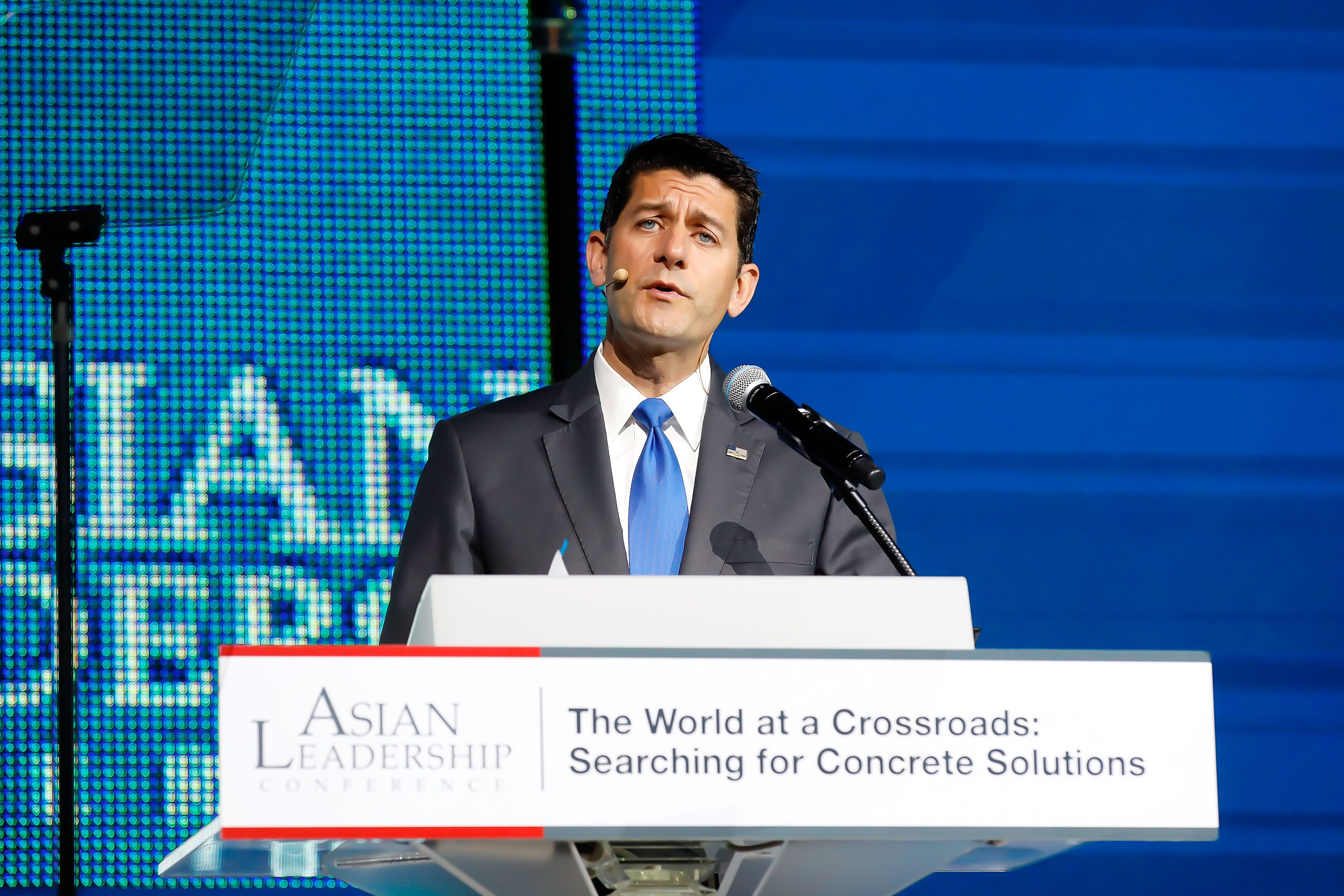
Keynote speaker Paul Ryan speaking at the 2019 ALC

The 10th Asian Leadership Conference hosted by The Chosunilbo has successfully come to a close. From 14 to 15 May at The Shilla Seoul, 200 world-renowned scholars and global leaders gathered at the ALC under the theme 'The World at a Crossroads: Searching for Concrete Solutions' ALC2019 aimed to find a path toward peace and prosperity through the experiences and wisdom of global leaders in a turbulent modern society. The agenda included topics such as Energy Policy and Democracy, Innovative Nation Israel, Future of Media, Crypto Billionaire's Promise: Decentralized Future, Cloud Changes the World, How to Fix Social Media, Populism & Korea Economy: Lessons from Latin America, Building Startup Ecosystem: Role of Finance, Outlook on US-South Korea Alliance, China and the International Politics of 5G, Smart City: A Smart Urban Future, Wearable Technology: Smart Fashion, Future of Robotics, AI and Medical Science, Journey of Asian Unicorns: What's Next?, Blockchain Dream in America, US-China Trade Disputes, Crypto as an Asset Class, Industrial IoT- Digital Transformation, Future of Women's Leadership, News Media in the Millennia Age, Authentic Leadership- Finding Your True North, and Seeing through Chinese Economy & Industry. Keynote speakers included: Paul Ryan The 54th Speaker of the US House of Representatives, Nikki Haley The 29th US Ambassador to the United Nations, Lothar de Maizière Former Prime Minister of the German Democratic Republic, Goh Chok Tong Emeritus Senior Minister of Singapore, Ehud Olmert Former Prime Minister of Israel, Gerhard Schröder Former Chancellor of Germany, Yves Leterme Former Prime Minister of Belgium/Secretary General of International IDEA, Matteo Renzi Former Prime Minister of Italy/ Senator of Italian Republic, Paul Romer Professor at Stern School of Business, New York University / The Recipient of the 2018 Nobel Prize in Economic Sciences, and Prince Andrew Founder of Pitch@Palace / Duke of York

== 2018 ==
The 9th Asian Leadership Conference took place in Walkerhill Hotel, Seoul, Korea from 16 to 17 May 2018. It was held under the theme of 'Globalization in Crisis: Navigating the World with New Opportunities'. The agenda included: New Security Landscape of the Korean Peninsula, Collaboration for Regional Peace and Security, Opportunity for Sustainable Growth, Blockchain & Cryptocurrency, New Phase of Prosperity in the Asia-Pacific, Global Economic Outlook, Tech Innovation, Global Entrepreneurs Foundation | Development of SMART HUMAN and GOOD HUMAN, and Entrepreneurship Bootcamp. Keynote speakers included Dick Cheney former vice president of the United States, Gerhard Schröder former chancellor of Germany, Jan Peter Balkenende former prime minister of the Netherlands, William Perry emeritus professor of Stanford University / former United States secretary of defense, Kono Yohei former speaker of the House of Representatives of Japan, Joachim Son-Forget member of the French parliament, Mai bint Mohammed Al Khalifa president of the Bahrain Authority for Culture and Antiquities, Li Zhaoxing former minister of foreign affairs of the People's Republic of China (PRC), Gloria Ai founder & CEO of iAsk Media, and Chemi Peres managing general partner & co-founder of Pitango / chairman of the Peres Center for Peace and Innovation

== 2017 ==
The 8th Asian Leadership Conference took place in Walkerhill Hotel, Seoul, Korea from 3 to 4 July 2017. 2017 ALC was held with the launch of the Hello Tomorrow Korea Inaugural Conference. The theme was 'New Leadership in the Era of Hyper-Uncertainty : Towards Cooperation and Prosperity'. The agenda included Leader & Innovation, The Better Society, Collaboration for Regional Peace and Security, Focus on China, Global Economy Outlook, Asia on the Rise, The Future of Health Tech and Sustainable Living, and Entering the Epoch for an Exponential Future. Keynote speakers included: Barack Obama Former President of the United States, David Cameron Former Prime Minister of the United Kingdom, Esko Aho Former Prime Minister of Finland / Executive in Residence at Aalto University, Enrico Letta Former Prime Minister of Italy / Dean of the Paris School of International Affairs of Sciences Po Paris, Shivshankar Menon Former National Security Adviser to Prime Minister Manmohan Singh, Irina Makieva Deputy Chairman of Bank for Development and Foreign Economic Affairs (Vnesheconombank), Justin Yifu Lin Honorary Dean of National School of Development at Peking University / Former Chief Economist and Senior Vice President at The World Bank, Terry Sweeney Managing Director of IBM Health, Wendy Cutler Vice President and managing director at Washington, D.C. Office at the Asia Society Policy Institute (ASPI) / Former Acting Deputy U.S. Trade Representative, Yvo De Boer Former Director-General of the Global Green Growth Institute / Former Executive Secretary of the United Nations Framework Convention on Climate Change (UNFCC), and John Yearwood Executive Board Chairman of International Press Institute

== 2016 ==
The 7th Asian Leadership Conference took place in Shilla Hotel, Seoul, Korea from 17 to 18 May 2016. Under the theme 'Asia Tomorrow: innovation 4.0', 2016 Asian Leadership Conference (ALC) brought together top leaders and intellectuals to share their knowledge and insight. It served as a platform for exploring ways to create a vision for future innovation. The agenda included topics such as: Asia Tomorrow: Securing Peace and Stability in Northeast Asia, Prosperity and Inequality, Past, Present and Future: Global and National Perspectives, Sharing Economy: Should It Be Expanded or Regulated?, Women's World: Should Gender Be an Issue?, Shopiology: The Power to Mesmerize Customers, Government Innovation: Efficiency through Innovation, Innovation in Labour Market via Flexibility, Sustainable Pension Reform, Higher Education for 21st Century Needs, The Future of Cybersecurity, Global Philanthropy: Caring Beyond Borders, Eradicating Poverty – From Receiving Fish to Learning How to Fish, and How to Maximize Social Responsibility of Corporate. Keynote Speakers included: Joko Widodo President of Indonesia, George W. Bush Former President of the United States, Gerhard Schröder Former Chancellor of Germany, Jenny Shipley Former Prime Minister of New Zealand, George Papandreou Former Prime Minister of Greece, Masoumeh Ebtekar Vice President of Iran, Kono Yohei Former Speaker of the House of Representatives of Japan, Jean-Vincent Placé Minister of State for State Reform and Simplification of France, Wolfgang Clement Former German Minister of Economics and Labour, and Elsa Fornero Former Minister of Labour, Social Policies and Gender Equality of Italy.

== 2015 ==
The Prime Minister, Shri Narendra Modi, addressing at the 6th Asian Leadership Conference, in Seoul, South Korea on May 19, 2015

The conference of 19 to 20 May 2015 was held at the Shilla Hotel, Seoul, Korea. The main theme was Commemorating the Past, Celebrating the Future referring to the 70th anniversary of the end of World War II and the 70th anniversary of Korean independence. The agenda included: the imperative of Korean unification with reference to economic development projects such as the Greater Tumen Initiative; efficient global aid giving; equality for women in business; models of innovative internet technology business models such as sharing economy, FinTech and Big Data marketing; and the fusion of the culture of Korean business, known as K culture with that of other businesses. Keynote speakers included: Narendra Modi, Prime Minister of India, Ban Ki-moon, Secretary-General of the United Nations, Chuck Hagel, Former US Secretary of Defense, Horst Köhler, Former President of the Federal Republic of Germany, Tang Jiaxuan, Former State Councilor of the People's Republic of China, H.H. Sheikha Moza bint Nasser, Chairperson of Education Above All, Murayama Tomiichi, Former Prime Minister of Japan, Jack Ma, Founder & Executive Chairman of Alibaba Group.

== 2014 ==
The conference of March 2014, was titled One Korea, New Asia. It examined Asian regional security, the integration of the Koreas and growth in Korea. The conference agenda included: Envisioning a Unified Korea, Asia’s Turning Point, New Order in the Asia-Pacific and Seeking a New Engine for Creative Growth. In 2014, George W. Bush attended. The keynote speakers were: Park Geun-Hye, President of the Republic of Korea, George W. Bush, President of the United States, Hatoyama Yukio, Prime Minister of Japan, *Goh Chok Tong, Prime Minister of Singapore. Julia Gillard, Prime Minister of Australia, Lothar De MaizÈre, Prime Minister of East Germany, Surin Pitsuwan, Secretary General of ASEAN, Leon Panetta, Secretary of Defense of the United States.

== 2013 ==
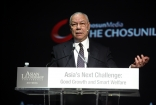
Secretary of Defense Colin Powell speaking at ALC 2013

ALC 2013 was convened on a background of turmoil from the 2008 financial crisis and the Eurozone crisis. ALC 2013 kept the "tab-ference" initiative that began with the ALC 2012. ALC 2013 also continued its partnership with Table for 2. One percent of registration fees were to be donated to the International Vaccine Institute to help treat cholera. The agenda for the conference included: Asia as the Next Solution; In Search of a New Growth Model for Asia: The Case of the Republic of Korea; Path to Good Growth and Preparing for the Asian Century. The keynote speakers were Colin Powell, US Secretary of State, Yasuo Fukuda, Prime Minister of Japan, Tarja Halonen, President of Finland, Fleur Pellerin, French junior minister for small and medium enterprises, innovation and the digital economy at the Ministry for Productive Renewal; Jan Peter Balkenende, Prime Minister of the Netherlands, Kevin Rudd, Prime Minister of Australia, Dominic Barton, global managing director of McKinsey & Company, David Rubenstein, the founder and chief executive officer of Carlyle Group, Douglas Flint, the group chairman of HSBC Holdings, Roland O’Hanley, president of asset management and corporative services, Fidelity Investments, Shigetaka Komori, the chairman and chief executive officer of Fujifilm Holdings Corporation and Steve Chen, a co-founder of YouTube.

== 2012 ==
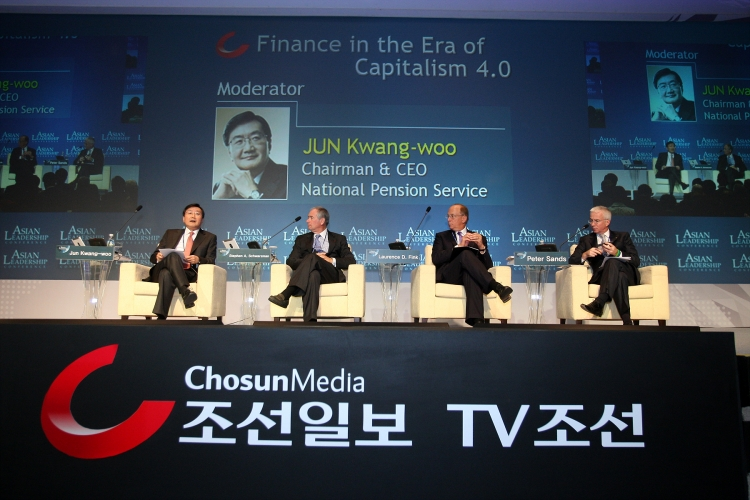
Panel discussion on finance in capitalism

ALC 2012 was held from 6 to 7 March 2012 at the Shilla Hotel, Seoul. The main theme of the conference was Capitalism 4.0: Searching for Post Crisis Solutions. Over 40 speakers and 900 guests attended. Discussion focussed on topics such as the 2008 financial crisis, social welfare, and CSR. ALC 2012 was the world's first tab-ference, a paper-free conference conducted entirely through tablet PC.

ALC 2012 was a joint venture with APPigital an international entity that seeks to reduce obesity in developed countries and malnutrition in third world countries through a calorie transfer program. The Shilla hotel, which was catering the conference, reduced the meal to ten to fifteen grams of food per serving (equivalent to 500 calories) for approximately one US dollar per serve. Money saved on the conference meal was donated to feed children in developing countries.

The conference also featured an open session for university students called the Chosun Talk. One hundred university students were chosen through an essay competition at the official conference website. They were invited to the talks of four speakers including PyeongChang's 2018 Winter Olympics bidding committee spokesperson, Theresa Rah; the founder and executive director of Table for Two, Masa Kogure, Wired senior writer Steven Levy, and the president and chief executive officer of Viacom International Media Networks, Robert Bakish. Each speaker spent approximately twenty-five minutes giving motivational speeches and answering students' questions.

The 2012 key note speakers were: Göran Persson, Prime Minister of Sweden. Thaksin Shinawatra, Prime Minister of Thailand, Stephen A. Schwarzman, Blackstone Group and Anatole Kaletsky, the author of Capitalism 4.0.

== 2008 ==
The ALC 2008 was held from 21 to 22 March 2008 at the Shilla Hotel, Seoul, South Korea. The main theme of the conference was Leadership and Change. Over 35 speakers and 500 guests attended. Fundamental changes in international systems and the need for new leadership that embraced regional and multilateral perspectives were discussed. The President of South Korea, Lee Myung-bak, the president elect, gave the welcome speech. The keynote speakers were: Henry Kissinger, US Secretary of State, Paul Keating, Prime Minister of Australia, Carlos Ghosn, president and chief executive officer of Renault-Nissan Alliance, and Jim Rogers, co-founder of Quantum Group of Funds.

== 2005 ==
ALC 2005 was held from 3 to 4 March 2005 at the COEX Grand Ballroom, Seoul, South Korea. It was the inaugural ALC and was titled "Cooperation and Rebuilding after the Tsunami". The conference was held on the 85th anniversary of the first publication newspaper, Chosun (조선일보). Its keynote speakers were: Megawati Sukarnoputri, President of Indonesia, Mahathir Mohamad, Prime Minister of Malaysia, Ong Keng Yong, ASEAN Secretary General and Nakasone Yasuhiro, Prime Minister of Japan.

== See also ==
- World Economic Forum
- Anti-globalization movement
- Globalization
- International Economic Forum
- International Transport Forum
- Istanbul World Political Forum
- World Social Forum
- Public Eye Awards
- St. Petersburg International Economic Forum
- Sustainable Development
- World economy
- World Knowledge Forum
- International Labour Organization
