= Trans-Pacific Partnership negotiations =

The negotiations for the Trans-Pacific Partnership Agreement were held between 12 countries between 2008 and 2015. The negotiations were aimed at obtaining an agreement between the Trans-Pacific Strategic Economic Partnership Agreement parties Brunei, Chile, Singapore and New Zealand, as well as the Australia and the United States.

== Trans-Pacific Strategic Economic Partnership Agreement ==
- Type: Trade agreement
- Drafted: 3 June 2005
- Signed: 18 July 2005
- Location: Wellington, New Zealand
- Effective: 28 May 2006
- Condition: 2 ratifications
- Parties: Brunei; Chile; Singapore; New Zealand
- Depositary: Government of New Zealand
- Languages: English and Spanish, in event of conflict English prevails

Brunei—a member of the Asia Pacific Economic Cooperation (APEC) since 1989— has played an important role in the formation of the earlier trade agreements that led up to the creation of TPP in 2005. In 2000 Brunei hosted the pivotal meeting of APEC where discussion began and later the ASEAN Regional Forum (ARF) in July 2002.

By 2001 New Zealand and Singapore had already joined in the New Zealand/Singapore Closer Economic Partnership (NZSCEP). The Trans-Pacific Strategic Economic Partnership Agreement (Trans-Pacific SEP) built on the NZSCEP.

During the 2002 Asia-Pacific Economic Cooperation (APEC) Leaders' Meeting in Los Cabos, Mexico, Prime Ministers Helen Clark of New Zealand, Goh Chok Tong of Singapore and Chilean President Ricardo Lagos began negotiations on the Pacific Three Closer Economic Partnership (P3-CEP). According to the New Zealand Department of Foreign Affairs and Trade,

The shared desire was to create a comprehensive, forward-looking trade agreement that set high-quality benchmarks on trade rules, and would help to promote trade liberalisation and facilitate trade within the APEC region.

— Ministry of Foreign Affairs and Trade, New Zealand 2005

Brunei first took part as a full negotiating party in April 2005 before the fifth, and final round of talks. Subsequently, the agreement was renamed to TPSEP (Trans-Pacific Strategic Economic Partnership agreement or Pacific-4). Negotiations on the Trans-Pacific Strategic Economic Partnership Agreement (TPSEP or P4) were concluded by Brunei, Chile, New Zealand and Singapore on 3 June 2005, and entered into force on 28 May 2006 for New Zealand and Singapore, 12 July 2006 for Brunei, and 8 November 2006 for Chile.

The original TPSEP agreement contains an accession clause and affirms the members' "commitment to encourage the accession to this Agreement by other economies". It is a comprehensive agreement, affecting trade in goods, rules of origin, trade remedies, sanitary and phytosanitary measures, technical barriers to trade, trade in services, intellectual property, government procurement and competition policy. Among other things, it called for reduction by 90 percent of all tariffs between member countries by 1 January 2006, and reduction of all trade tariffs to zero by the year 2015.

Although original and negotiating parties are members of the Asia-Pacific Economic Cooperation (APEC), the TPSEP (and the TPP it grew into) are not APEC initiatives. However, the TPP is considered to be a pathfinder for the proposed Free Trade Area of the Asia Pacific (FTAAP), an APEC initiative.

== Negotiations ==
In January 2008, the US agreed to enter into talks with the Pacific 4 (P4) members regarding trade liberalisation in financial services. On 22 September 2008, US Trade Representative Susan C. Schwab announced that the US would be the first country to begin negotiations with the P4 countries to join the TPP, planning to start the first round of talks in early 2009. In November 2008, Australia, Vietnam, and Peru announced that they would also join the P4 trade bloc. In October 2010, Malaysia announced that it had also joined the TPP negotiations.

After the inauguration of President Barack Obama in January 2009, the anticipated March 2009 negotiations were postponed. However, in his first trip to Asia in November 2009, President Obama reaffirmed the United States' commitment to the TPP, and on 14 December 2009, new US Trade Representative Ron Kirk notified Congress that President Obama planned to enter TPP negotiations "with the objective of shaping a high-standard, broad-based regional pact". On the last day of the 2010 APEC summit, leaders of the nine negotiating countries endorsed the proposal advanced by US President Barack Obama that set a target for settlement of negotiations by the next APEC summit in November 2011.

In 2010, Canada had become an observer in the TPP talks, and expressed interest in officially joining, but was not committed to join, purportedly because the US and New Zealand blocked it because of concerns over Canadian agricultural policy (i.e. supply management)—specifically dairy—and intellectual property-rights protection. Several pro-business and internationalist Canadian media outlets raised concerns about this as a missed opportunity. In a feature in the Financial Post, former Canadian trade-negotiator Peter Clark claimed that the US Obama Administration had strategically outmaneuvered the Canadian Harper Government. Wendy Dobson and Diana Kuzmanovic for The School of Public Policy, University of Calgary, argued for the economic necessity of the TPP to Canada. Embassy warned that Canada's position in APEC could be compromised by being excluded from both the US-oriented TPP and the proposed China-oriented ASEAN +3 trade agreement (or the broader Comprehensive Economic Partnership for East Asia).

In February 2012 a call for co-operation between the WTO and Economic Partnership Agreements (also termed regional trade agreements) like the TPP came after Pierre Lellouche described the sentiment of the Doha round negotiations; "Although no one wants to say it, we must call a cat a cat (failure is failure)...".

In June 2012, Canada and Mexico announced that they were joining the TPP negotiations. Mexico's interest in joining was initially met with concern among TPP negotiators about its customs policies. Canada and Mexico formally became TPP negotiating participants in October 2012, following completion of the domestic consultation periods of the other nine members.

On 23 July 2013, Japan officially joined the TPP negotiations. According to the Brookings Institution, Prime Minister Abe's decision to commit Japan to joining the TPP should be understood as a necessary complement to his efforts to stimulate the Japanese economy with monetary easing and the related depreciation of the Yen. These efforts alone, without the type of economic reform the TPP will lead to, are unlikely to produce long-term improvements in Japan's growth prospects.

In April 2013 APEC members proposed, along with setting a possible target for settlement of the TPP by the 2013 APEC summit, that World Trade Organization (WTO) members set a target for settlement of the Doha Round mini-package by the ninth WTO ministerial conference (MC9), also to be held around the same time in Bali.

A set of draft documents leaked in late-2013 indicated, that public concern had little impact on the negotiations. They also indicated there are strong disagreements between the US and negotiating parties regarding intellectual property, agricultural subsidies, and financial services.

On 1 August 2015 a spokesman for Australia's Trade Minister Andrew Robb confirmed, that no conclusion had been reached during the Ministerial Meeting in Hawaii, U.S., in late July 2015. Robb told the media that Australia had made progress on sugar and dairy matters, but the balance that the Australian government was seeking had not yet been finalized.

== Negotiation rounds ==
Nineteen formal rounds of TPP negotiations were held from 2010–2013:

Round	Dates	Location	US Trade Representative's summary
1st	15–19 March 2010	Melbourne, Victoria, Australia	The negotiating groups that met included industrial goods, agriculture, sanitary and phytosanitary standards, telecommunications, financial services, customs, rules of origin, government procurement, environment, and trade capacity building. Negotiators agreed to draft papers in preparation for the second round of negotiations.
2nd	14–18 June 2010	San Francisco, California, USA	This round included "determining the architecture for market access negotiations, deciding the relationship between the TPP and existing FTAs among the negotiating partners, addressing "horizontal" issues such as small business priorities, regulatory coherence, and other issues that reflect the way businesses operate and workers interact in the 21st century, and proceeding toward the tabling of text on all chapters of the agreement in the third negotiating round, scheduled for October in Brunei."
3rd	5–8 October 2010	Brunei	This round included "meetings on agriculture, services, investment, government procurement, competition, environment, and labor. The groups focused on the objectives that they had set for this round: preparation of consolidated text and proposals for cooperation. Negotiations will continue through Saturday, with groups on telecommunications, e-commerce, textiles, customs, technical barriers to trade, and trade capacity building beginning Friday."
4th	6–10 December 2010	Auckland, New Zealand	In the 4th round talks, the negotiating countries "began work on trade in goods, financial services, customs, labor, and intellectual property. They also discussed cross-cutting issues, including how to ensure that small- and medium-sized enterprises can take advantage of the TPP, promoting greater connectivity and the participation of U.S. firms in Asia-Pacific supply chains and enhancing the coherence of the regulatory systems of the TPP countries to make trade across the region more seamless."
5th	14–18 February 2011	Santiago, Chile	In Santiago, the negotiating countries "made further progress in developing the agreement's legal texts, which will spell out the rights and obligations each country will take on and that will cover all aspects of trade and investment relationships. The teams carefully reviewed the text proposals made by each country, ensuring understanding of each other's proposals so negotiations could advance. With consolidated negotiating texts in most areas, partners began seeking to narrow differences and to consider the interests and concerns of each country."
6th	24 March – 1 April 2011	Singapore	In Singapore, "the United States and TPP countries made substantial headway toward a key goal of developing the legal texts of the agreement, which include commitments covering all aspects of their trade and investment relationship. Recognizing the priority of this negotiation as well as the challenge of negotiating a regional agreement with nine countries, each country began showing the type of flexibility that will be needed to successfully conclude the negotiation. As a result, the teams were able to narrow the gaps in their positions on a wide range of issues across the more than 25 chapters of the agreement."
7th	15–24 June 2011	Ho Chi Minh City, Vietnam	In Vietnam, "among the issues on which the teams had particularly productive discussions were the new cross-cutting issues that will feature for the first time in the TPP. After consulting internally on the U.S. text tabled at the sixth round, they furthered their efforts to find common ground on the regulatory coherence text intended to make the regulatory systems of their countries operate in a more consistent and seamless manner and avoid the types of regulatory barriers that are increasingly among the key obstacles to trade. The teams also had constructive discussions on approaches to development in the TPP and the importance of ensuring that the agreement serves to close the development gap among TPP members."
8th	6–15 September 2011	Chicago, Illinois, USA	"Negotiators from the nine TPP partner countries – Australia, Brunei Darussalam, Chile, Malaysia, New Zealand, Peru, Singapore, Vietnam, and the United States – are reporting good progress early in the eighth round of talks, expected to last through 15 September. Negotiating groups that have already begun meetings include services, financial services, investment, customs, telecommunications, intellectual property rights (IPR), government procurement, sanitary and phytosanitary measures, and environment. Numerous negotiating teams are also holding bilateral meetings."
9th	22–29 October 2011	Lima, Peru	"During this round, negotiators built upon progress made in previous rounds and pressed forward toward the goal of reaching the broad outlines of an ambitious, jobs-focused agreement by the Asia-Pacific Economic Cooperation Leaders' meeting in Honolulu, HI next month. At APEC, President Obama and his counterparts from the other eight TPP countries will take stock of progress to date and discuss next steps."
10th	5–9 December 2011	Kuala Lumpur, Malaysia	
11th	2–9 March 2012	Melbourne, Victoria, Australia	
12th	8–18 May 2012	Dallas, Texas, USA	
13th	2–10 July 2012	San Diego, California, USA	
14th	6–15 September 2012	Leesburg, Virginia, USA	
15th	3–12 December 2012	Auckland, New Zealand	
16th	4–13 March 2013	Singapore	
17th	15–24 May 2013	Lima, Peru	
18th	15–24 July 2013	Kota Kinabalu, Malaysia	
19th	23–30 August 2013	Bandar Seri Begawan, Brunei	"explored how to develop a mutually-acceptable package, including possible landing zones on remaining sensitive and challenging issues and sequencing of issues in the final talks. Particular areas of focus have included matters related to market access for goods, services/investment, financial services, and government procurement as well as the texts covering intellectual property, competition, and environmental issues. We also discussed the remaining outstanding issues on labor, dispute settlement, and other areas. "

After the 19th round of formal meetings, negotiations stopped taking the form of official rounds, but other meetings, such as Chief Negotiators Meetings and Ministers Meetings, continue.

Type of meeting	Dates	Location	US Trade Representative's summary
Chief Negotiators Meeting	18–21 September 2013	Washington, DC	
Ministerial meeting	3-? Oct 2013	Bali, Indonesia	"Environment, intellectual property, and state-owned enterprises."
	28 October – 1 November 2013	Mexico City, Mexico	"Rules of Origin"
	30 October – 2 November 2013	Washington, D.C.	"Government Procurement"
	4 – 7 November 2013	Santiago, Chile	"State-Owned Enterprises"
	6 – 9 November 2013	Washington, D.C.	"Investment"
	12 – 14 November 2013	Washington, D.C.	"Legal and Institutional Issues"
	12 – 18 November	Salt Lake City, UT	"Rules of Origin"
Chief Negotiators Meeting	19–24 November 2013	Salt Lake City, USA	"Chief Negotiators and Key Experts"
Ministers Meeting	7–10 December 2013	Singapore	
Ministers Meeting	21–25 February 2014	Singapore	
Ministers Meeting	18–20 May 2014	Singapore	
Chief negotiators meeting	3–13 July 2014	Ottawa, Canada (changed from Vancouver)	
Chief negotiators meeting	1–10 September 2014	Hanoi, Vietnam	
Ministers Meeting	24–27 October 2014	Sydney, Australia	
Leaders’ and Ministers’ Meeting	November 2014	Beijing, China	
Chief negotiators meeting	8–12 December 2014	Washington, D.C.	
Chief negotiators meeting	26 January – 1 February	New York City, USA	
Chief negotiators meeting	9–15 March 2015	Hawaii	
Chief negotiators meeting	23–26 April 2015	Maryland	
Chief negotiators meeting	14–28 May 2015	Guam	Ministerial meeting cancelled over uncertainty whether the United States would pass TPA authority.
Ministerial meeting	24–31 July 2015	Hawaii, United States	
Chief negotiators meeting	26–30 September 2015	Atlanta, Georgia	

== Points of contention within the agreement ==
=== Causes of delays ===
Exposure by Wikileaks of the Intellectual Property Rights and Environmental chapters of the TPP in December 2013 revealed "just how far apart the US is from the other nations involved in the treaty, with 19 points of disagreement in the area of intellectual property alone. One of the documents speaks of 'great pressure' being applied by the US." Australia in particular opposes the US's proposals for copyright protection and an element supported by all other nations involved to "limit the liability of ISPs for copyright infringement by their users." Another sticking point lies with Japan's reluctance to open up its agricultural markets.

Political difficulties, particularly those related to the passage of a Trade Promotion Authority (TPA) by the U.S. Congress, presented another hold on the TPP negotiations. The chairs of the Congressional Progressive Caucus released a statement in opposition to the TPP. "This deal is not the most progressive trade deal ever." "While details are still emerging, we are concerned the Trans-Pacific Partnership (TPP) will destroy jobs and depress wages, threaten health and safety standards, harm our air, land and water, and make it harder for patients to access life-saving drugs" Receiving TPA from Congress was looking especially difficult for Obama since members of his own Democratic Party are against it, while Republicans generally support the trade talks. "The TPP and TPA pose a chicken-and-egg situation for Washington. Congress needs to pass TPA to bring the TPP negotiations to fruition, but the Obama administration must win favorable terms in the TPP to pull TPA legislation through Congress. Simply put, the administration cannot make Congress happy, unless it can report on the excellent terms that it has coaxed out of Japan.". Obama received Trade Promotion Authority on 29 June 2015.

=== United States–Japan bilateral accords (agriculture and auto) ===
Before Japan entered TPP negotiations in July 2013, reports indicated that it would allow the U.S. to continue imposing tariffs on Japanese vehicles, despite a "major premise of the TPP [being] to eliminate all tariffs in principle." According to the reports, Japan compromised on auto tariffs "because Tokyo wants to maintain tariffs on various agricultural products."

By April 2015 U.S. Trade Representative (USTR) Michael Froman and Japanese Economy Minister Akira Amari —representing the two largest economies of the 12-nation TPP—were involved in bilateral talks regarding agriculture and auto parts, the "two largest obstacles for Japan." These bilateral accords which would open each other's "markets for products such as rice, pork and automobiles." In Japan "rice, wheat, barley, beef, pork, dairy goods, sugar and starch crops are considered politically sensitive products that have to be protected." During the two-day ministerial TPP negotiating session held in Singapore in May 2015, veteran U.S. trade negotiator Wendy Cutler and Oe Hiroshi of the Japanese Gaimusho held bilateral trade talks regarding one of the most contentious trade issues—automobiles. American negotiators wanted the Japanese to open their entire keiretsu structure which is the corner stone of Japanese economy and society to American automobiles. They wanted Japanese dealer networks, such as Toyota, Nissan, Honda, Mitsubishi, and Mazda, to sell American cars. Oe Hiroshi responded that there are fewer American car dealerships in Japan because Japanese consumers prefer European and Japanese cars to American cars. Different vehicle safety program structures also complicate efforts at reciprocal recognition; in Japan and Europe, new vehicles are compliance-tested before they're allowed on the market. Under American laws, automakers self-certify their cars as compliant, and cars are tested only after they go on sale. Nevertheless, as of November 2015 an agreement was released whereby Japan will recognize seven U.S. vehicle safety standards as no less stringent than Japanese national standards: those for front and rear collision, flammability of interior materials, license plate lights, interior rearview mirror impact absorption, and windshield wiping, washing, and defogging systems.

During the late July 2015 negotiations held in Maui, Hawaii, the U.S. Trade Representative Michael Froman brokered an unanticipated North American–Japan side-deal with Japan, on behalf of the U.S., Canada and Mexico that "lowered the threshold" for how much of an automobile "would have to come from Trans-Pacific signatory countries" in order for it to avoid hefty tariffs when entering Canada, Mexico or the United States. This percentage dropped from 62.5 per cent under the current North American Free Trade Agreement, to somewhere between 30 per cent and 55 per cent under the July side deal. Canada and Mexico are concerned that this unexpected side deal "could hit the NAFTA partners' auto sectors hard."
