= Mehdi Mabrouk =

Tunisian politician

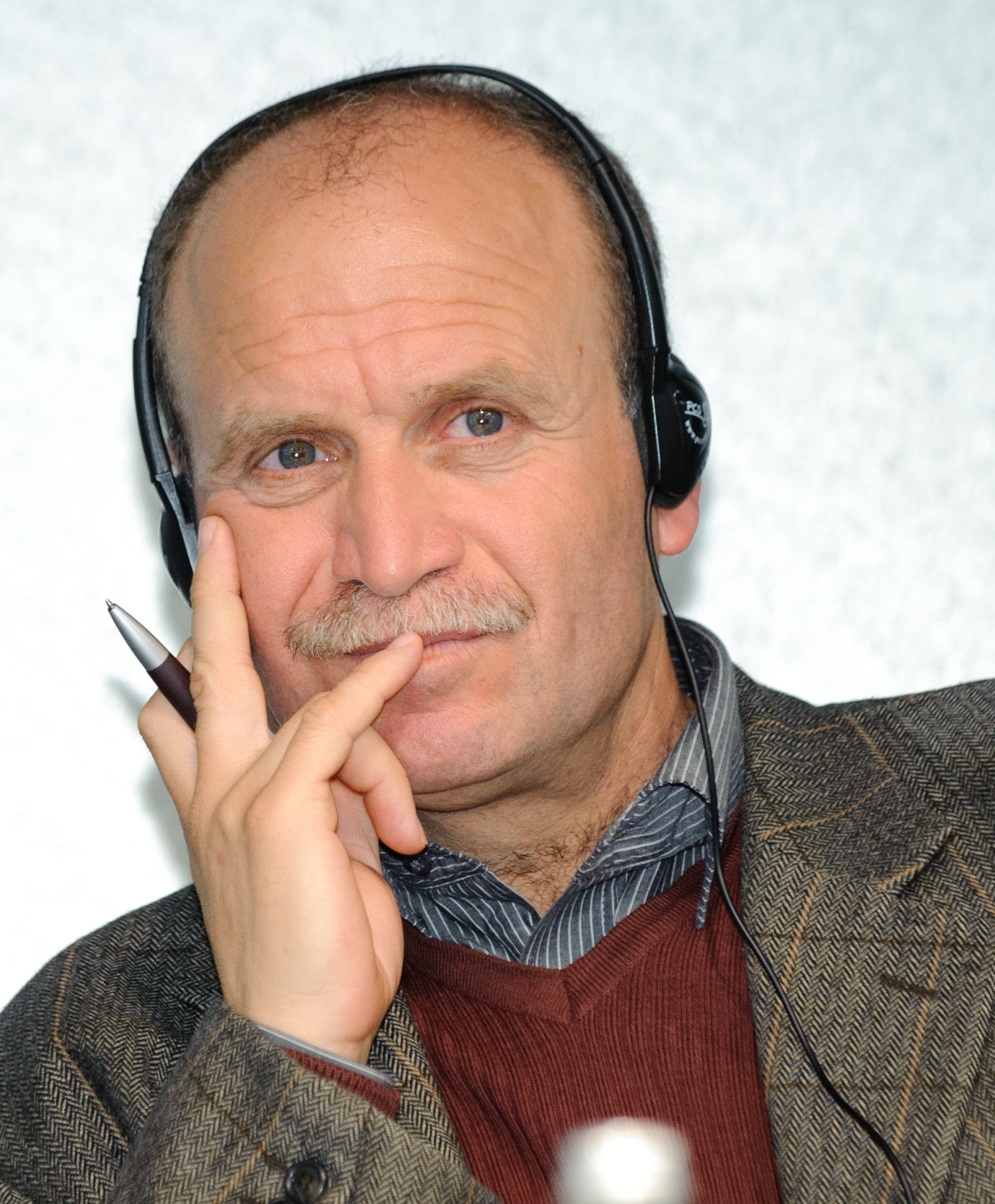
- Mahdi Mabrouk tunisian minister of culture

Minister of Culture
- In office 20 December 2011 – Unknown

Mehdi Mabrouk is a Tunisian politician. He served as the Minister of Culture under Prime Minister Hamadi Jebali.

== Biography ==
=== Academic career ===
He has taught sociology at the University of Tunis, with lectures on illegal immigration and youth issues. He has also been a scholar at the Tunisian Center of Economic and Social Studies. In June 2011, he said Tunisia was ill-equipped to handle the wave of immigration from Libya.

Mabrouk is also the Chief of the Tunis Office of the Arab Center for Research and Policy Studies, and regularly speaks at some of its conferences.

==== Minister ====
On 20 December 2011, after former President Zine El Abidine Ben Ali was deposed, he joined the Jebali Cabinet as Minister of Culture. He has spoken at the Istanbul World Political Forum.

== Bibliography ==
- Voile et sel: culture, foyers et organisation de la migration clandestine en Tunisie (2010)
