= Heo Se-uk =

South Korean activist (1953–2007)

- Died: 15 April 2007

- Heo Se-uk
- Hangul: 허세욱
- Hanja: 許世旭
- RR: Heo Seuk
- MR: Hŏ Seuk

Heo Se-uk (Korean: 허세욱; 1953–2007) was a 54-year-old South Korean labor union member and taxi driver who set himself ablaze on April 1, 2007, in Seoul to protest the U.S.-Korea Free Trade Agreement. He lived for two weeks after the incident, despite serious burns on 63% of his body. He finally succumbed to a septic infection on April 15.

== See also ==
- Self-immolation
