= United States–Korea Free Trade Agreement =

2012 to present trade deal

United States–South Korea Free Trade Agreement

- South Korea: United States

- United States–Korea Free Trade Agreement
- Hangul: 한·미 자유 무역 협정
- Hanja: 韓美自由貿易協定
- RR: Han·Mi jayu muyeok hyeopjeong
- MR: Han·Mi chayu muyŏk hyŏpchŏng

The United States–Korea Free Trade Agreement (officially: Free Trade Agreement Between the United States of America and the Republic of Korea), also known as KORUS FTA, is a trade agreement between the United States and South Korea. Negotiations were announced on February 2, 2006, and concluded on April 1, 2007. The treaty was first signed on June 30, 2007, with a renegotiated version signed in early December 2010.

The agreement was ratified by the United States on October 12, 2011, with the Senate passing it 83–15 and the House 278–151. It was ratified by the National Assembly of South Korea on November 22, 2011, with a vote of 151–7, with 12 abstentions. The agreement entered into effect in March 2012. Another renegotiation took place from late 2017 to late March 2018, when an agreement was reached between both governments.

The treaty's provisions eliminate 95% of each nation's tariffs on goods within five years, and create new protections for multinational financial services and other firms. For the United States, the treaty was the first free trade agreement (FTA) with a major Asian economy and the largest trade deal since the North American Free Trade Agreement (NAFTA) in 1993. For South Korea, the KORUS FTA is second in size only to the FTA signed with the European Union and dwarfs other FTAs signed with Chile, Singapore, the European Free Trade Area and the Association of Southeast Asian Nations (ASEAN).

== History ==
While the treaty was signed on June 30, 2007, ratification was slowed when President George W. Bush's fast-track trade authority expired and a Democratic Party-controlled Congress expressed objections to the treaty related to concerns over bilateral trade in automobiles and U.S. beef exports. Nearly three years later, on June 26, 2010, President Barack Obama and President Lee Myung-bak expressed renewed commitment to the treaty, stating that they would direct their governments to resolve remaining obstacles to the agreement by November 2010.

After discussions at the November 2010 G-20 Seoul summit and further negotiations in December 2010 in Maryland, Presidents Obama and Lee announced on December 4, 2010, that a deal had been reached; they subsequently signed an updated version of the agreement. On March 15, 2012, the agreement entered into effect.

=== 2008–11 ===
2008

Soon after being signed by the US President George W. Bush and his South Korean counterpart, Roh Moo-hyun, rumors spread of a possible renegotiation of the text, citing possible opposition by the U.S. Democrats. However, Kim Jong-Hoon, South Korea's chief negotiator for the 10-month talks that brought the FTA, denied such rumors assuring journalists that "The deal has been done and that's it. There will be no renegotiations." Kim's comment came after his American counterpart, Wendy Cutler, assistant US trade representative for Japan, Korea and APEC Affairs and chief negotiator of the KORUS FTA negotiations, indicated that the Democrats might demand amendments in the labor area.

On September 16, 2008, U.S. Commerce Secretary Carlos Gutierrez asked the U.S Congress to ratify the Korea-U.S. free trade treaty as soon as possible, arguing that "trade creates more jobs and boosts economic growth". He called on the U.S. Congress to swiftly approve pending trade deals with Colombia and Panama as well.

The Grand National Party (GNP) was at the same time considering its position the National Assembly's ratification of the agreement. At a meeting of its top council held October 2, 2008, at party headquarters in Yeouido, GNP leadership expressed divergent opinions. GNP chairman Park Hee-tae and supreme council member Chung Mong-joon sided with the argument for circumspection. Park said it was first necessary to establish a plan for farmers and fishermen negatively affected by the agreement. He suggested looking at the government's countermeasures, then discussing passage of the FTA. But leaders within the National Assembly of South Korea argued for a quick resolution. Floor leader Hong Joon-pyo is reported to have said that the United States could propose renegotiations in the area of automobiles, which they felt was disadvantageous to the U.S. auto industry. He stated this could be done following the U.S. election, but that it was necessary to ratify the FTA before then.

On October 1, 2008, a South Korean trade official said that ratification was unlikely within the year given the U.S. political climate. On October 2, 2008, South Korea completed all procedures for parliamentary ratification and the trade bill was submitted to the National Assembly. The Korean ambassador to the United States, Lee Tae-shik, held more than 300 meetings with U.S. Congressmen to persuade them to ratify the FTA, which was facing objection from Democrats, who held a majority in both the House of Representatives and the Senate.

U.S. presidential election

During the 2008 U.S. presidential election, both Senator John McCain of the Republican Party and Senator Barack Obama of the Democratic Party expressed commitment to a U.S.–Korea alliance, but the Democratic Party expressed anxiety about globalization and renewed doubts about trade liberalization, which it argued could jeopardize the Korea-U.S. Free Trade Agreement. Its presidential candidate Barack Obama opposed the KORUS FTA as "badly flawed" during his campaign because in his view it would not do enough to increase U.S. auto sales. His criticism echoed the auto labor unions. Obama said he would vote against the FTA if it came to the floor of the U.S. Senate and that he would send it back to Korea if elected president.

Obama had expressed similar negative feelings about the North American Free Trade Agreement between the U.S., Canada and Mexico, threatening during February 2008 campaign stops in industrial states to "opt out" of the three-nation agreement. His senior economic advisor Austan Goolsbee assured Canadian officials in a private meeting on February 9 that Obama's rhetoric was "more reflective of political maneuvering than policy".

The Republican Party pointed to a $20 billion increase in annual bilateral trade as evidence that both countries would benefit economically from lowering trade barriers, citing the Korea-U.S. trade deal as an example of the rewards of free trade in an era of growing economic globalization.

During the last half of 2008, U.S. officials expressed confidence that the trade deal would be approved after the November 4 election.

December 2010 agreement

The December 2010 agreement represented a compromise between the two sides. Significant concessions were granted to the United States on trade in automobiles: tariff reductions for Korean automobiles were delayed for five years, and U.S. autos were granted broader access to the Korean market. At the same time, the negotiators agreed to set aside disagreements over U.S. beef exports for the time being.

The deal was supported by Ford Motor Company, as well as the United Auto Workers, both of which had previously opposed the agreement. Remarking on the UAW's support, an Obama administration official was quoted as saying, "It has been a long time since a union supported a trade agreement" and thus the administration hopes for a "big, broad bipartisan vote" in the U.S. Congress in 2011. At the time of its December 2010 announcement, the White House also published a collection of statements from a wide range of elected officials (Democrats and Republicans), business leaders, and advocacy groups expressing support for the KORUS FTA.

2011 developments

After the opposition party backtracked on their agreement to negotiate the FTA, taking a more hardline stance, the ruling Grand National Party reportedly considered expediting ratification of the FTA alone in the National Assembly.

Seoul wanted products made by South Korean companies in the Kaesong Industrial Region in North Korea included in the deal; Washington did not. The disagreement is unresolved but was not allowed to scupper the deal, which allows for further talks on the subject.

The Seoul Administrative Court officially decided to release details on approximately 300 translation errors of the free trade agreement-related documents to public on December 2, 2011.

Lee Jeong-ryeol (이정렬), the chief prosecuting attorney at the Changwon District Court in South Gyeongsang Province criticized the FTA on his Facebook account, prompting concern from the judicial scene.

There is a judicial movement to establish a special task group to speculate of a possible renegotiation of the agreement.

=== Renegotiation, 2016–2018 ===
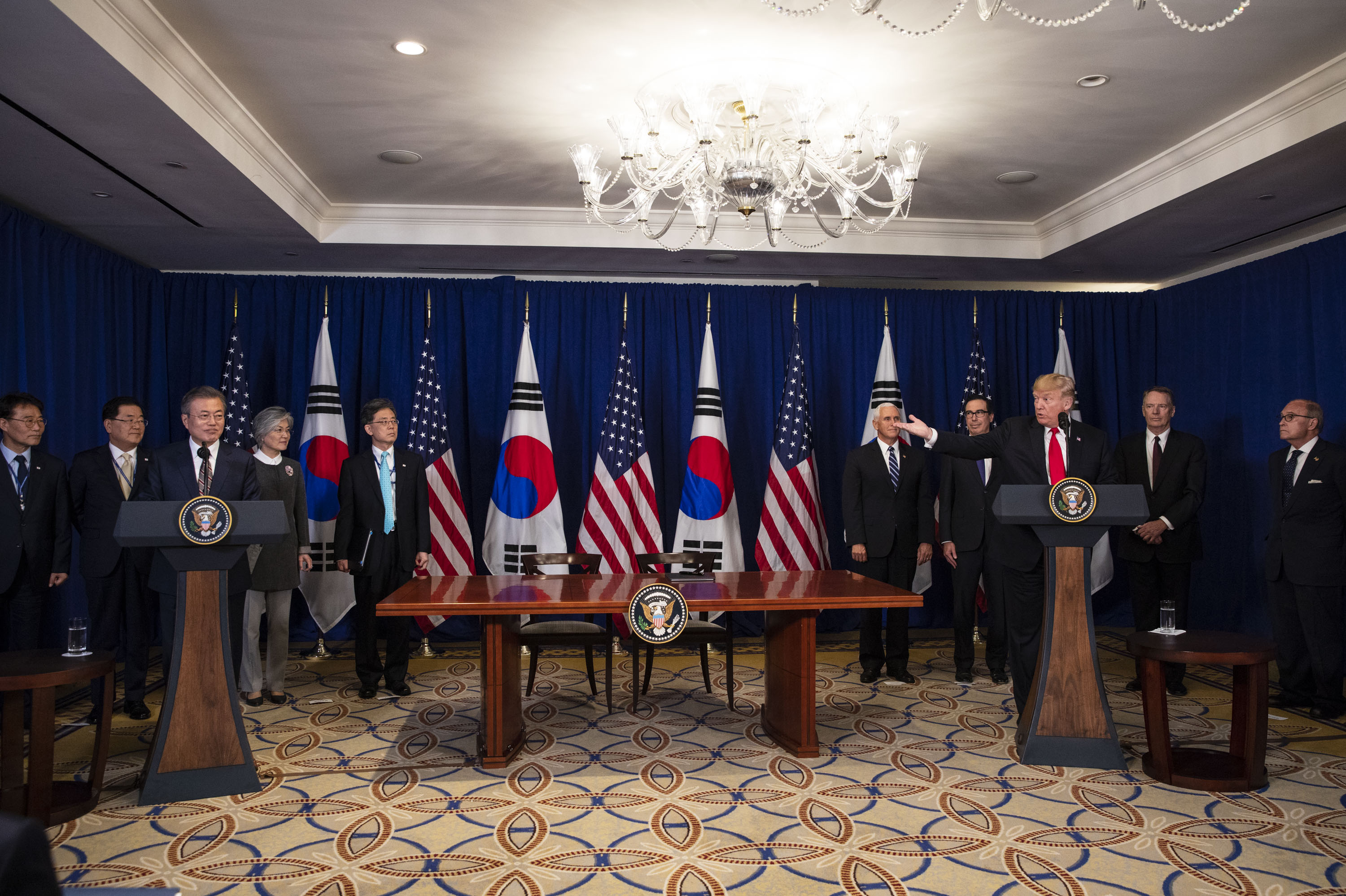
President Donald Trump and the President of South Korea Moon Jae-in deliver remarks after signing the United States-Korea Free Trade Agreement on September 24, 2018

During the United States presidential campaign of 2016, Republican candidate Donald Trump described the United States–Korea Free Trade Agreement as a "job-killing trade deal".

On April 27, 2017, President Trump announced his intention to renegotiate or terminate the treaty, describing it as a "one-way street" and "a Hillary Clinton disaster, a deal that should've never been made", characterizing the resulting situation as "We're getting destroyed in Korea" and that "It's a horrible deal, and we are going to renegotiate that deal or terminate it." According to Trump, "We've told them that we'll either terminate or negotiate; we may terminate", while South Korea's Ministry of Trade said it had yet to receive a request to open renegotiations.

On September 2, 2017, President Trump said he was weighing whether to soon start the process of withdrawing from the agreement. Trump said he was consulting with his top advisors, some of whom supported withdrawal and some of whom – including Gary Cohn, President Trump's chief economic advisor – did not. The United States Chamber of Commerce expressed opposition to withdrawing from the agreement. By October 4, 2017, the Trump administration had backed away from considering a full withdrawal from KORUS FTA and instead agreed with South Korea to renegotiate the deal.

On March 16, 2018, the third round of Korea-U.S. FTA talks began. The talks concluded later on March 27, when an agreement in principle was reached between the Trump administration and the South Korean government. The terms included an increase of annual U.S. auto exports from 25,000 vehicles to 50,000 that are only required to meet U.S. safety regulations instead of South Korean regulations. A cap will also be placed on steel exports from South Korea to the United States, though South Korea will remain exempt from the 25% steel tariff the Trump administration placed on most other nations. On the 24th of September, 2018 U.S. President Donald Trump and South Korea's President Moon Jae-in signed the new agreement at the Lotte Palace hotel in New York City.

Critics did not see any benefit for the United States in these provisions, given the number of exports to South Korea was unlikely to reach the lower quota, and Korean car makers were not importing trucks into the United States.

=== 2019 ===
In September 2019, the United States filed an environmental complaint under the agreement, alleging some fishing by South Korean vessels violated fishery management rules.

=== 2025 ===
Upon taking office in January 2025, the new US President Donald Trump began abandoning previous free trade commitments and enacting unilateral tariffs on targeted goods, including those to which South Korea had substantial exposure - automobiles, automobile parts, and steel. On February 13, he ordered the preparation of broader tariffs, ostensibly to punish countries with which the United States had a trade surplus in goods. South Korea asked the United States to exclude it from new tariffs, citing low duties under the free trade agreement. Deputy Trade Minister Park Jong-won traveled to Washington, D.C. to make the case.

Trump's so-called Liberation Day tariffs were announced on April 2, with a 25% unilateral tariff on South Korea and a baseline 10% worldwide tariff. This rate took effect for a few hours on April 9, crashing US financial markets. Trump paused the high per-country rates and gave several extensions. South Korea negotiated a 15% tariff, and promised a $350 billion investment in the United States. The new rate took effect on August 7, 2025. The Bank of Korea projected this would reduce the growth of the South Korean economy by 0.45% in 2025 and 0.6% in 2026.

== United States reactions ==
=== Opponents ===
Opponents make the following arguments:

- The exclusion of rice is unfair to Korean rice exporters.
- The agreement gives South Korea too much time to eliminate agricultural tariffs on US beef.
- The agreement says little about services, a U.S. strength and the country's chief focus in bilateral negotiations.
- South Korea has long been accustomed to selling cars, computers and ships around the world.
- South Korea provides Korean farmers with levels of subsidy considerably higher than farmers elsewhere in the world.
- In 2008, some U.S. lawmakers opposed the free trade deal with South Korea, citing an imbalance in auto trade. They also wanted more steel shipments to South Korea.
- The U.S. think-tank Economic Policy Institute predicted that it would lead to the loss of 159,000 jobs.

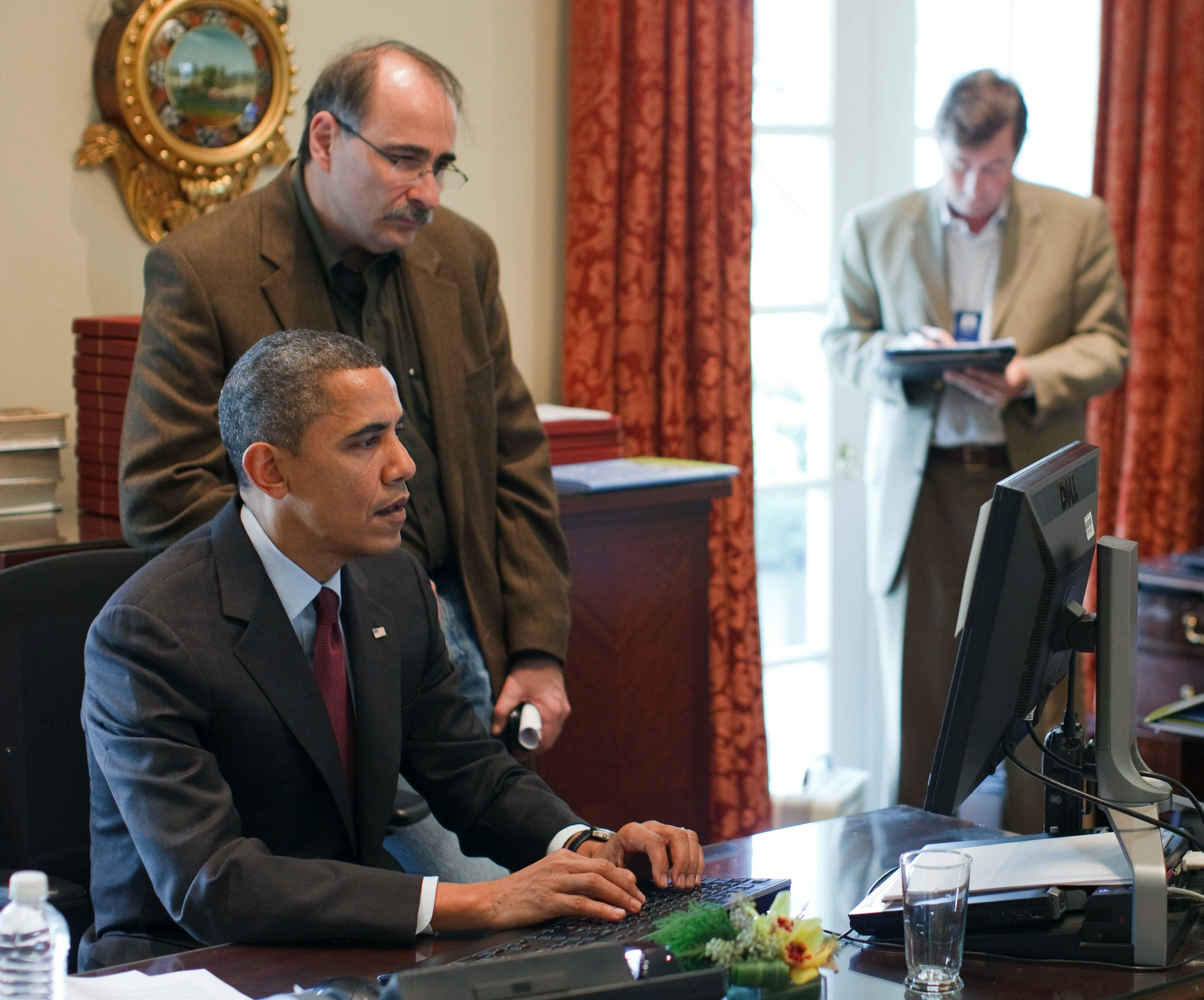
President Obama makes last-minute edits to a speech announcing the KORUS FTA on December 4, 2010.

- Much attention has been focused on automobiles, hitherto a major U.S. grievance and a large component of the bilateral trade deficit: during 2006, only about 4,000 U.S.-manufactured cars (excluding GM's Daewoo subsidiary) were sold in South Korea while sales of cars manufactured by South Korean companies (including cars manufactured in Korean-owned U.S. plants) in the United States exceeded 800,000. South Korean automakers sold 730,863 vehicles in the United States in 2005, while American auto companies sold only 5,795 in South Korea, according to Commerce Department figures.
- The FTA will abolish taxes in South Korea "on large cars produced in the United States, which U.S. auto makers have long called an impediment to market access in Korea".
- When President Obama committed to move the Korea FTA in 2010, Democratic members of Congress and Democratic-affiliated groups strongly criticized the decision. President Richard Trumka of the AFL-CIO said: "Our negotiators should go back to the table to address the imbalanced market-access provisions in the agreement and to revisit the flawed investment, procurement, and services provisions as well. President Obama promised a 'smart, fair and strong' trade policy. The KORUS FTA does not meet this standard, and we will work closely with the Administration and Congress to improve this agreement on behalf of American and Korean workers. Unless and until the agreement is amended to address these concerns, we will strongly oppose passage of the U.S.-South Korea trade agreement."
- Chairwoman Louise Slaughter (D-N.Y.) of the House Rules Committee said: "I am surprised that the Administration would try to slide this poorly written trade deal past the American public when Congress has already said that the deal is not good for our economy or workers… To try and advance the Korean FTA when so many workers are still struggling to find work would simply move our economy backward. This trade pact was written by a Republican Administration with the corporate bottom line in mind. The President has pledged to work hand in hand with Congress, but there are significant changes that must be made in order for this free trade agreement to gain broad Congressional support."
- Immediately following the passage of KORUS in October 2011, certain companies and industry groups voiced their concern for the deal. According to the United States International Trade Commission, the American textile industry is expected to lose jobs as South Korean manufacturers make the same products at 15 to 20 below the cost to American manufacturers.
- Citing concern over American jobs, Allen E. Gant, Jr., the president and CEO of textile manufacturer Glen Raven, said "We are very much in favor of global trade, but we're just not about having agreements that are unfair to the U.S. textile industry.[...]The U.S. needs every single job that we can get." Others in the American textile industry, which has experienced a sustained decline for decades, stated that there was a lack of commitment by the U.S. government to preserve American textile manufacturing.
- The Korean entertainment industry opposed the agreement. In particular the Korean movie industry opposed the deal because it reduced screen quotas which protected their movie industry from Hollywood domination.

=== Advocates ===
Advocates make the following arguments:

- Allowing South Korea to reduce tariffs on agricultural products over an extended period will ultimately earn the U.S. sufficient preference in this market, keeping out rival suppliers.
- According to the U.S. International Trade Commission (ITC), KORUS would add a minimum of $9.7 billion to U.S. exports and boost U.S. GDP by at least $10.1 billion.
- The U.S. Chamber of Commerce, a business lobbying group in favor of the FTA, predicts that the Korea FTA will create U.S. jobs.
- U.S. financial services firms such as Citigroup have pushed for the Korea FTA. Citigroup's Laura Lane, corporate co-chair of the U.S.–Korea FTA Business Coalition, stated that "it is the best financial services chapter negotiated in a free trade agreement to date".
- On September 28, 2008, the U.S. Chamber of Commerce's Vice President of Asia and President of the U.S.–Korea Business Council Myron Brilliant argued the automobile trade imbalance between the United States and South Korea could be leveled by the U.S. Congress passing the KORUS FTA. He stated, "it includes strong commitments by the Korean government to address virtually every tariff and non-tariff market access barrier to U.S. automobiles in Korea raised by the U.S. auto industry during the FTA negotiations."
- One poll in April 2007 indicated support for the FTA at 58.5%.
- In March 2006, prior to the formal U.S.–Korea negotiations, the Coalition of Service Industries (CSI) stated that one of its primary objectives in the negotiation related to data processing services:
- The agreement requires Korea to reduce "car taxes that are based on engine displacement that allegedly disadvantage U.S.-made cars, which tend to be larger than domestically-produced Korean cars".
- The Obama administration has opposed these engine displacement taxes even while vowing to support domestic limits on greenhouse gas emissions.
- More than $1 billion worth of U.S. farm exports to South Korea will become duty-free immediately. Most remaining tariffs and quotas will be phased out over the first 10 years the agreement is in force. KORUS FTA would remove tariffs on 95% of consumer and industrial products between the countries within three years. South Korean industrial tariffs average 6.5% – and many are 8% – making market access a very important issue for U.S. industries.
- The agreement does require both countries to enforce their own labor and environmental laws, and ensures access to legal mechanisms to ensure enforcement.
- South Korean public companies receive opportunities for privatization.
- Rice is excluded, at Seoul's insistence. In return, South Korea will reduce its 40% tariff on U.S. beef over 15 years.
- The Coalition of Service Industries testified that "Korean laws make it difficult for foreign companies to outsource and offshore activities. These laws often relate to privacy (private data protection law and real name law). Under the Protection and Use of Credit Information Law and its Presidential Decree, foreign companies operating in Korea are prohibited from transferring any customer data whatsoever out of Korea, even for the purposes of processing data to their own affiliates. In addition, as a result of the revision of the Insurance Business Act in May 2003, it is mandatory for insurance companies to maintain in-house the basic human and non-human resources, including IT systems, necessary for insurance business. These restrictions seriously undermine the government's goal of making Korea into a financial 'hub' by significantly increasing the cost of operating in Korea. These regulations should be modified to permit companies to follow their global operating models for outsourcing and offshoring provided they have existing practices to protect consumer information."

== South Korea reactions ==
As it does in the United States, the FTA proves a highly divisive issue in Korea. Opposition arguments tend to focus on perceived disparities in the agreement as well as public opinion. Advocates tend to focus on economic predictions.

=== Opponents ===
- The Korea Rural Economic Institute predicts that U.S. agricultural exports to South Korea, currently $2.8 billion, could double after the FTA, causing the loss of up to 130,000 jobs.
- Citizens' groups worried about transparency, the environment and labor standards say the deal was deficient as it was agreed on behind closed doors. The South Korean government, for example, has not allowed open, public debate about the FTA's impact on the nation's economy and sovereignty. The Korean Advertising Broadcasting Agency blocked the running of an advertisement produced by farmers protesting the deal. "Should the FTA become law after an undemocratic process and in spite of mass popular opposition, the FTA will drive the perception in South Korea that America's democratic rhetoric is merely a cover for profit-seeking behavior", Korean Americans for Fair Trade said.
- Baek Il, professor of Commercial Distribution Studies at Ulsan College, protested against the free trade agreement as "a destruction of the South Korean domestic manufacturing industry" in 2006 and in 2011.
- Several massive protests against the FTA have taken place in the country. A nationwide protest on November 22, 2006, reportedly drew 65,000 to 80,000 people, with 9,000 to 20,000 of them gathering at the city hall in Seoul. A protester named Heo Se-uk set himself on fire Sunday shouting "Stop the Korea-U.S. FTA" outside the hotel where negotiators were meeting. He was being treated for third-degree burns, police said. The overall opinion of the population has fluctuated over time and is difficult to gauge.
- Other polls indicated a majority opposed to the agreement, including an 83% no confidence rating in the government's ability to negotiate the agreement. The Lee Myung-bak administration has taken considerable political heat for its part in advancing the FTA, as did the previous Roh Moo-hyun administration. President Lee had to endure months of protests over the decision to reopen American beef imports, a decision that was made primarily with an eye towards securing American support for the FTA.
- Agriculture in South Korea is expected to be adversely affected, and $119 billion in aid to South Korean farmers has been announced over the next ten years to offset the effects of the finalized agreement.
- Fifteen anti-KORUS FTA university students were arrested in front of the Blue House fountain on December 10, 2011.
- Around 100 people who work the domestic beef industry protested against the Lee Myung-bak government in Jeonju on January 5, 2012, as the authorities are alleged to abandon the South Korean farmers in favor of American beef.

=== Advocates ===
- South Korean public companies receive opportunities for privatization.
- The Korea Institute for International Economic Policy estimates that exports to the United States will rise by 12% per year, or $5.4 billion, and grow by 15% in the longer run.
- Proponents of the FTA cite that it will create more jobs than the ones destroyed, and will be, on the long term, beneficial for the country.
- Business groups welcomed the news that South Korea concluded the free trade agreement with the U.S. business leaders stressed the importance of smoothly implementing the next steps, including ratifying the agreement in the National Assembly of South Korea.
- Lee Hee-beom, the chairman of the Korea International Trade Association (KITA) declared that "This is our country's first step in its endeavor to join the group of advanced economies", adding that "the government should work out measures to compensate those who might suffer from the market opening and continue the restructuring process. The National Assembly should ratify the FTA as soon as possible so that the negotiations will show results quickly." Similar statements were made by the Federation of Korean Industries: "With the successful conclusion of the FTA talks with the U.S. as momentum, this agreement will upgrade the traditional alliance with the United States to a higher level, and greatly help our enterprises advance into the US".
- The Korea Chamber of Commerce and Industry said, "We should view the FTA from the broad standpoint of promoting national interests rather than the interests of specific industries or groups".
- The free trade agreement is expected to increase the growth rate of the South Korean GDP by 0.6% per year for the next 10 years. The South Korean government also cite increased foreign direct investment in Korea and heightened competition.
- The trade accord will knock down tariff and non-tariff barriers between the world's largest and 11th-largest economies, which did US$74 billion in two-way trade in 2006.

== Effects ==
- The 775,000 vehicles Korea sold in the United States in 2007 include 250,000 that were made at the Hyundai plant in Alabama. When Hyundai brings its Kia factory in Georgia on line, it will increase Korea's total production capacity in the United States to 600,000 units per year. If GM Daewoo vehicles are included in U.S. companies' sales in Korea, their market share there rises to 12.8%, versus a U.S. market share of 5% for Korean manufacturers.
- A market opening already underway in law and accounting will widen, but major service sectors such as education and healthcare were excluded. Labor productivity in the South Korean service sector is just 56% of that in manufacturing, far below OECD's average of 93%.

== See also ==
- South Korea–United States relations
- Free trade area
- Free trade
- Rules of Origin
- Market access
- Free-trade area
- Tariffs
