= Greater Tumen Initiative =

Northeast Asian development program

Member countries

The Greater Tumen Initiative (GTI) is a multilateral cooperation framework for the Tumen River Basin, involving China, Russia, Mongolia, and South Korea. North Korea participates occasionally. It began as the UN-led Tumen River Area Development Programme (TRADP) in 1991, became GTI in 2005, and aligned with China's Belt and Road Initiative in 2015.

GTI operates through six sectoral committees (transport, tourism, trade/investment, energy, agriculture, environment) and four partnerships. This stage included the creation of China's Hunchun International Cooperation Demonstration Zone in 2012 and closer alignment with Russia's Far Eastern development strategy.

Concrete results remain limited. North Korea withdrew in 2009 but has shown renewed interest since 2018.
