= Istanbul World Political Forum =

Turkish foundation

World Political Forum
- Formation: 2010 - World Political Forum
- Type: Non-profit organization
- Legal status: Foundation
- Headquarters: Istanbul, Turkey
- Region served: Worldwide
- Chief Executive Officer: Ahmet Eyüp Özgüç
- Website: http://www.worldpoliticalforum.net

The World Political Forum (also called Istanbul Forum) is a non-profit foundation, based in Turkey, best known for its annual meeting in Istanbul. The forum takes place with the participation of statesmen, CEOs, opinion leaders, bureaucrats and the business elite as well as renowned figures from reputable universities.

== History ==
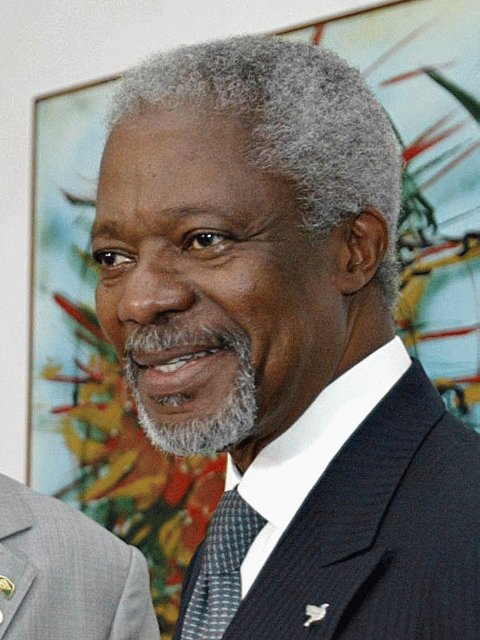
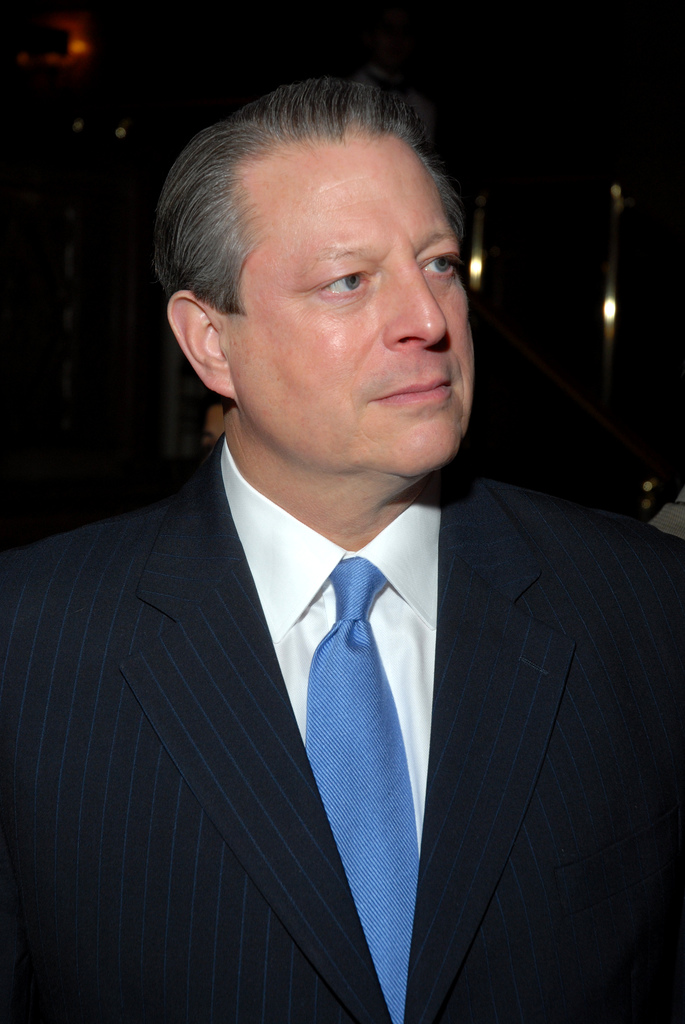
Nobel Peace Prize recipients Kofi Annan and Al Gore were among the speakers of the 2011 summit.

Ahmet Eyüp Özgüç is the current President of the Foundation which originally started the preparations for the summit in 2010, and sought to broaden its vision further to include providing a platform for resolving international conflicts.

The first was held on 13–14 March 2011, in Istanbul and was hosted by the Turkish Foundation and supported by the Turkish Prime Ministry. The theme was “Changing to meet, meeting to change”, emphasizing the radical changes in policymakers’ thinking now taking place and the importance of sharing new ideas to address the urgent problems facing particularly the Middle East. The summit was the first of what Turkish Foundation President Ahmet Eyüp Özgüç planned to be an annual forum supported by the Turkish Foundation. Just as the G8 is losing out to a more representative G20 in global economic decision-making, the Turkish organizers intend that such summits provide a more democratic platform for voices of change.

The second World Political Forum was held on May 17–18, 2012, with the theme of "Building a New World".

Third summit is to be held in June 2013 with the theme "A New and Righteous World Order".

== Participants ==
The two-day event called the “Leaders of Change Summit” opened March 13, 2011. It consisted of nearly 100 speakers:

- Vedat Akgiray, Chairman of the Capital Markets Board of Turkey
- Sayyed Ammar Alhakim, President of Islamic Supreme Council of Iraq
- Tariq al-Hashimi, Vice President of Iraq
- Abdulkadir Aksu, Vice President of Justice and Development Party
- Metropolit Alexander, Russian Orthodox Church, the Metropolit of Astana and Kyrgyzstan
- Kofi Annan, 7th Secretary-General of the United Nations
- Ömer Aras, Finansbank Group CEO
- Prof. Deniz Ülke Arıboğan, Istanbul Bilgi University member of board of trustees
- Bülent Arınç, State Minister and Deputy Prime Minister of Turkey
- Mykola Azarov, Prime Minister of Ukraine
- Sheik Dr. Muhammad Sabah Al-Salem Al-Sabah, Kuwait Deputy Prime Minister and Minister of Foreign Affairs
- Ali Babacan, Minister of State and Deputy Prime Minister of Republic of Turkey
- Abdullah Ahmad Badawi, 5th Prime Minister of Malaysia
- Egemen Bağış, Minister of EU Affairs and Chief Negotiator of the Republic of Turkey
- Zvi Bar'el, Author-Journalist
- Prof. Ali Bardakoğlu, Former President of Religious Affairs of Republic of Turkey
- Bartholomew I, Patriarch of the Fener Greek Orthodox Patriarchate in Istanbul
- Deniz Bayramoğlu, Journalist / Writer
- Tevfik Bilgin, Chairman of BRSA (Banking Regulation and Supervision Agency)
- Prof. Nick Bostrom, Oxford University Director of Future of Humanity Institute
- Pier Luigi Celata, Secretary General of the Council of Inter-religions in Vatican
- Ahmed Najib Chebbi, Tunisia Minister of Development, President of Democratic Party
- Helen Clark, Administrator of UNDP
- Prof. Paul Collier, Professor of Economics at the University of Oxford Economics Department
- Wendy Chamberlin, President of Washington Middle East Institute
- Eric Cornut, Head Novartis Pharma Region Europe
- Cengiz Çandar, Coloumnist in Radikal Newspaper
- Mevlüt Çavuşoğlu, President of the Parliamentary Assembly of the Council of Europe
- Gökhan Çetinsaya, President of Istanbul Şehir University
- Ahmet Davutoğlu, Minister of Foreign Affairs
- Kemal Derviş, Director of the Global Economy and Development Program at the Brooking Institution
- Ekrem Dumanlı, Zaman Newspaper Executive Editor
- Prof. William Eimicke, Founding Director of School of International and Public Affairs, Columbia University
- Şükrü Elekdağ, Ambassador, Member of the Parliament
- Prof. John Ellis, Cern
- Ekrem Erdem, AKP (Justice and Development Party) Deputy Chairman
- Zeynel Abidin Erdem, Erdem Holding Chairman of the Board of Directors
- Recep Tayyip Erdogan, Prime Minister of the Republic of Turkey
- Hüseyin Erkan, Chairman of Istanbul Stock Exchange
- Vicente Fox, 35th President of Mexico and Member of the Club of Madrid
- Aart de Geus, Deputy-Secretary-General of OECD
- Prof. Jay Goodman, Professor of Political Science at Wheaton College
- Al Gore, 45th Vice President of the United States of America
- Zeynep Göğüş, Journalist - Writer
- Prof. Mehmet Görmez, President of Religious Affairs of Republic of Turkey
- Isak Haleva, Chief Rabbi of Turkish Jewish Community
- Oğuz Haksever, Journalist
- Bakir Izetbegović, President of Bosnia Herzegovina
- Lionel Jospin, 165th Prime Minister of France and Member of the Club of Madrid
- Ibrahim Kalin, Senior Advisor to the Prime Minister of Republic of Turkey
- Stephen Kinzer, Journalist and Author
- Metin Kilci, Undersecuretary of Republic of Turkey Ministry of Energy and Natural Resources
- Wim Kok, Former Prime Minister of Netherlands and Member of the Club of Madrid
- Temel Kotil, Turkish Airlines CEO
- Ludger Kühnhardt, Director of the Center for European Integration Studies
- Mehdi Mabrouk, Tunisian Minister of Culture
- Prof. Ali Mazrui, Professor at The State University of New York at Binghamton
- Murat Mercan, President of Turkish Parliamentary Foreign Relations Commission
- Hossein Nasr, Professor of Islamic studies at the George Washington University
- Ahmet Eyüp Özgüç, Board of Directors of TÜGAV
- Ömer Özkaya, Editor in chef of East West Researches Institute
- Hegumen Philip, Russian Orthodox Church Hegumen
- Prof. Tariq Ramadan, Professor of Contemporary Islamic Studies at the University of Oxford
- Rahip Gregory Roschin, Russian Orthodox Church
- Prof. Mehdi Roustami, Iran Oil University Faculty Member
- Lucian Sarb, Euronews Director of News and Programmes
- Ali Saydam, Bersay CEO
- Rabbi Arthur Schneier, President and Founder of the Appeal of Conscience Foundation
- Yavuz Semerci, Journalist and Writer
- Prof. Yunus Söylet, President of Istanbul University
- Lord Nicholas Stern, Professor at London School of Economics
- Ümit Sezgin, editorial director of TRT TURK
- Ferit Faik Şahenk, Chairman of Doğuş Holding
- Idris Naim Şahin, Member of Turkish Parliament
- Özay Şendir, Journalist and Writer
- Sani Şener, TAV CEO
- Mehmet Şimşek, Republic of Turkey Finance Minister
- John Sitilides, Principal, Trilogy Advisors LLC, Washington, D.C.
- Hashim Thaçi, Prime Minister of Kosovo
- Prof. Vito Tanzi, Economist and Writer
- Gönül Tol, Director for The Center Turkish studies at the Washington Middle East Institute
- Kadir Topbaş, Mayor of Istanbul Metropolitan Municipality
- Hadi Ulengin, Journalist Writer
- Levent Veziroğlu, Executive Vice President, Doguş Group Office of the Chairman
- Rüdiger Voss, CERN Senior Physicist
- Eric Walberg, Journalist
- Ross Wilson, Atlantic Council Dinu Patriciu Director of Eurasia
- Hayati Yazıcı, Minister of State and Deputy Prime Minister of the Republic of Turkey
- Binali Yıldırım, Republic of Turkey Minister of Transport and Communications
- Taner Yıldız, Republic of Turkey Minister of Energy and Natural Resources
- Durmuş Yılmaz, Governor of the Central Bank of the Republic of Turkey
- Ulrich Zachau, Country Director for Turkey Europe and Central Asia Region of the World Bank

== See also ==
- anti-globalization movement
- globalization
- world economy
- World Economic Forum
- Horasis The Global Visions Community
- World Knowledge Forum
- World Social Forum
- Public Eye Awards
