= Wendy Cutler =

American diplomat

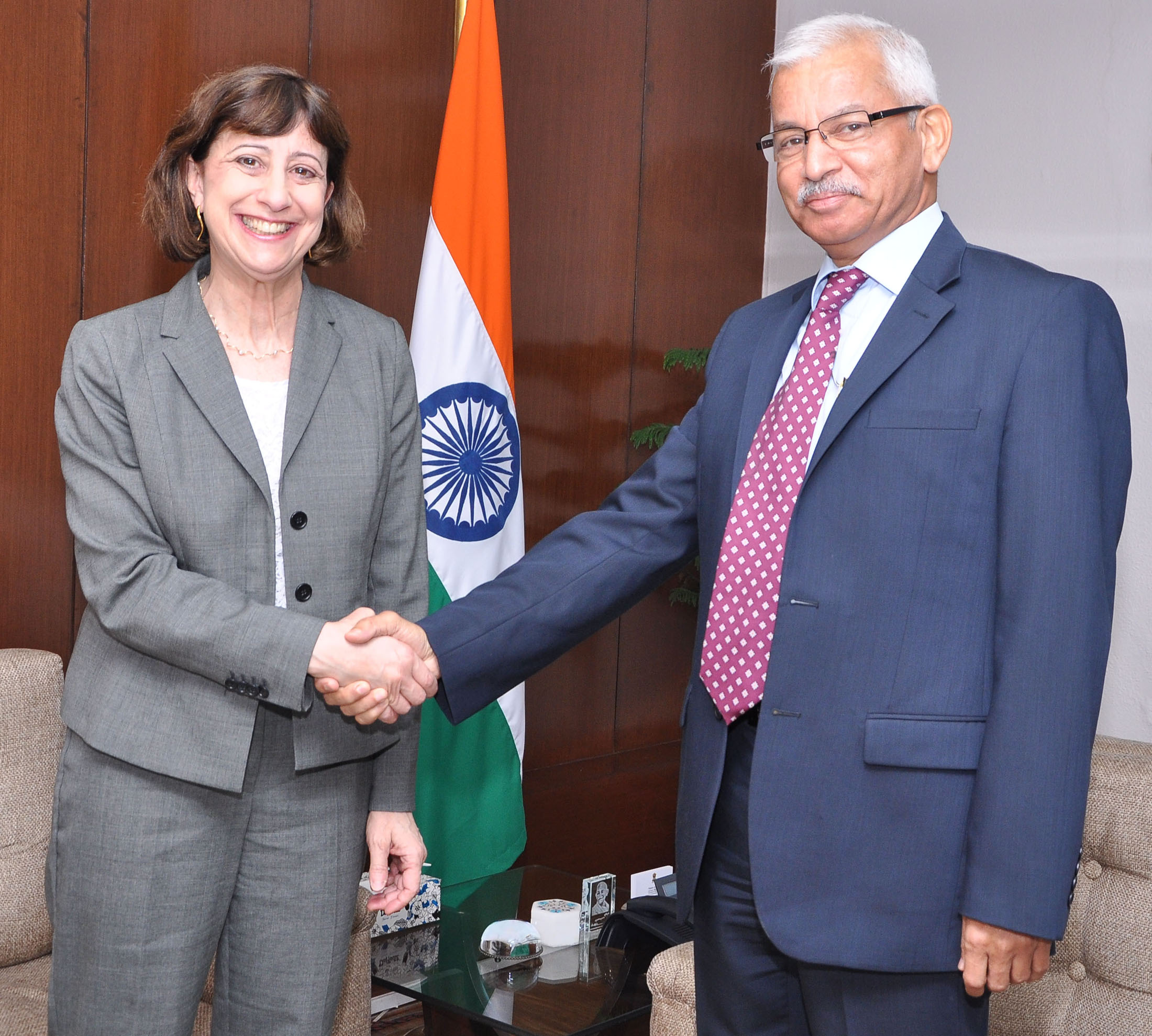
- The Acting Deputy U.S. Trade Representative, Ms. Wendy Cutler meeting the Union Commerce Secretary Shri Rajeev Kher, in New Delhi on September 17, 2014
- Education: George Washington University (BA), Georgetown University (MA)
- Occupation: Diplomat
- Employer: Asia Society

Wendy Cutler is an American diplomat currently serving as Vice President of the Asia Society Policy Institute and managing director of its Washington D.C. office. She also serves on the board of advisors for Georgetown University Walsh School of Foreign Service's Institute for the Study of Diplomacy.

== Education ==
Cutler holds a BA in international relations from George Washington University's Elliott School of International Affairs in 1979 and a MA in Foreign Service from Georgetown University.

== Career ==
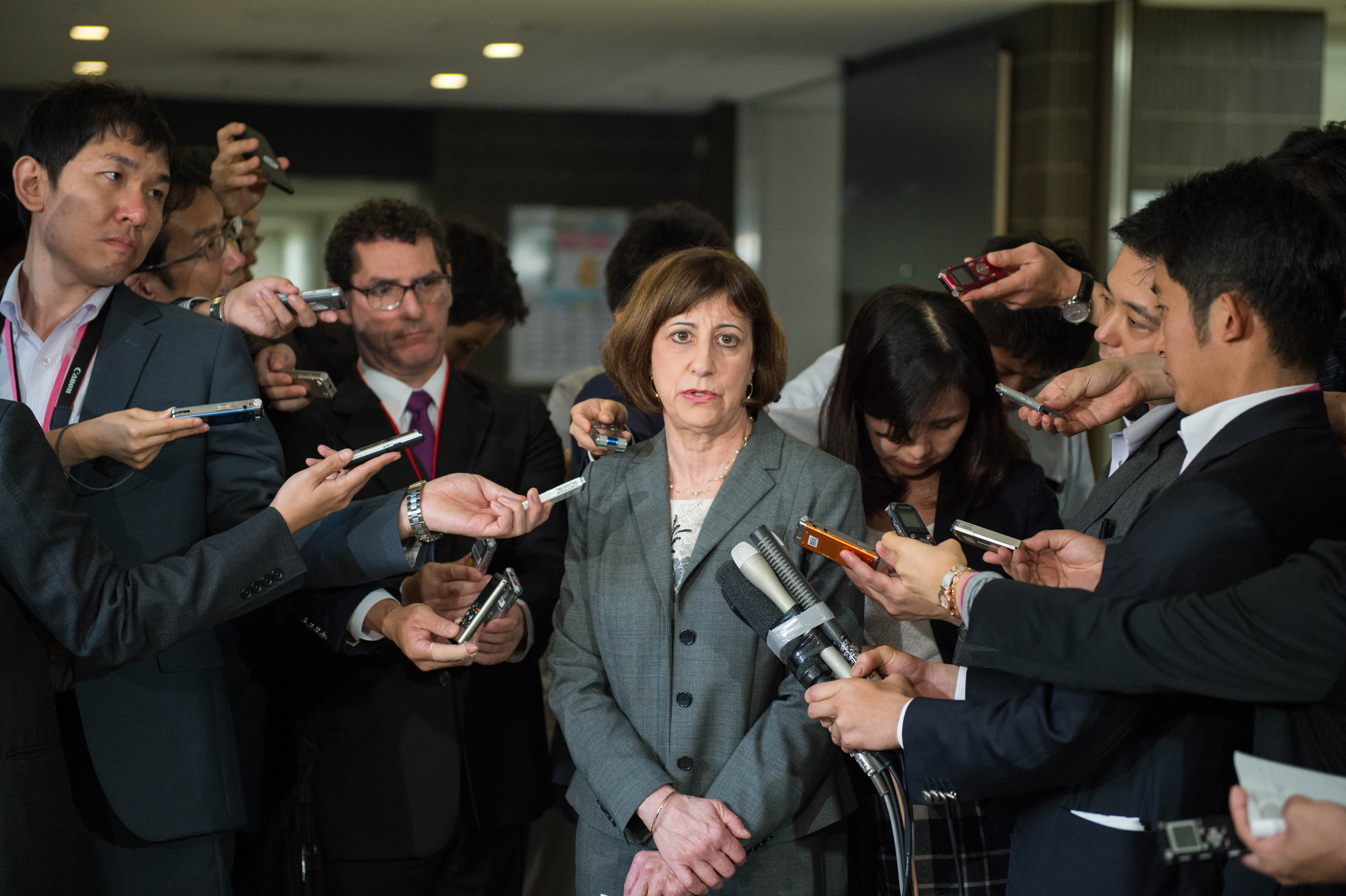
Acting Deputy USTR Wendy Cutler Addresses Media in Tokyo - East Asia and Pacific Media Hub

Cutler joined the Asia Society in November 2015 following a near 30-year career as a diplomat and negotiator in the Office of the U.S. Trade Representative (USTR), where she also served as Acting Deputy U.S. Trade Representative.

Cutler worked on a range of negotiations and initiatives related to the Asia-Pacific, including the U.S.-Korea Free Trade Agreement, the Trans-Pacific Partnership, U.S.-China trade relations, the WTO Financial Services negotiations, the Asia Pacific Economic Cooperation (APEC) Forum, and the U.S.-India Trade Policy Forum.

Prior to her USTR service, Cutler worked for the Commerce Department on trade-related issues from 1983 to 1988.

Cutler started her government career as a Presidential Management Fellow after completing her graduate studies in economics and trade at Georgetown.

== Publications ==
=== Reports ===
- Resilience & Resolve: Lessons from Lithuania's Experience with Chinese Economic Coercion, Asia Society, April 17, 2024 (co-authored with Shay Wester)
- Jump-starting U.S. Trade and Economic Engagement in the Indo-Pacific, Asia Society, September 13, 2023

=== Articles ===
- How Will the Next US President Tackle the China Economic Challenge? The Diplomat, April 1, 2024
- U.S. made the most of APEC given what it had to work with, Nikkei Asia, November 27, 2023
- It's Time for America and India to Talk Trade, Foreign Affairs, April 14, 2022 (co-authored with Kenneth I. Juster, Mohan Kumar, and Naushad Forbes)
- America Must Return to the Trans-Pacific Partnership, Foreign Affairs, September 10, 2021
