= Opinion polling for the 2019 Tunisian presidential election =

Polling for the 2019 Tunisian presidential election, which took place on 15 September 2019, with a runoff on 13 October 2019.

== Second round ==
=== Polls ===
Polling firm	Fieldwork date	Sample size	Karoui QT	Saïed

== First round ==
=== Polls ===
Polling firm	Fieldwork date	Sample size	Chahed TT	Karoui QT	Saïed	Moussi PDL	Marzouki MTV	M. Abbou CD	Jomaa AE	Hammami FP	Saïd	Marzouk MT	Mraïhi	Aïdi BW	Hamdi CA	Makhlouf	Jalloul NT	Jebali	Riahi	Mourou ME	Zbidi
Emrhod Consulting	15 September 2019		8.71%	15.26%	18.95%	4.59%	2.95%	3.38%	1.56%	1.27%	7.66%	–	5.15%	–	0.8%	3.79%	–	–	0.38%	12.59%	9.9%
Sigma Conseil	15 September 2019	38 900	7.5%	15.5%	19.5%	5.1%	3.1%	4.3%	0.2%	1.7%	7.4%	0.3%	5.8%	0.3%	0.4%	4%		0.3%	0.2%	11%	9.4%

Polling firm	Fieldwork date	Sample size	Chahed TT	Karoui QT	Saïed	Moussi PDL	Marzouki MTV	M. Abbou CD	Jomaa AE	Hammami FP	Saïd	Marzouk MT	Morjane TT	Aïdi BW	Hamdi CA	Zenaidi	Jalloul NT	Jebali	Riahi	Chebbi MD	Zbidi
	25 July 2019	The Independent High Authority for Elections moves up the election and runoff dates from 17 November 2019 and 24 November 2019 to 15 September 2019 and 22 September 2019 respectively in order to find a successor in accordance with the 90-day interim presidency period called for by the Constitution																			
	25 July 2019	Beji Caid Essebsi passes away in office at the age of 92; Mohamed Ennaceur sworn in as Interim President of Tunisia on a 90-day interim basis																			
	23 July 2019	Abdelkarim Zbidi announces that he will not run for the election																			
	16 July 2019	Electoral period begins; no further polls are allowed																			
Emrhod Consulting	10–13 July 2019	1200	7.8%	23%	14%	5.2%	3.1%	2.8%	2.6%	1.4%	2%	–	1.6%	–	1%	–	–	1%	–	–	–
Sigma Conseil	3–9 July 2019	2056	7%	23%	20%	12%	7%	5%	3%	1%	–	–	3%	–	1%	–	–	1%	–	–	3%

Polling firm	Fieldwork date	Sample size	Chahed TT	Karoui QT	Saïed	Moussi PDL	Marzouki MTV	M. Abbou CD	Jomaa AE	Hammami FP	Saïd	Marzouk MT	Morjane IND then TT	S. Abbou CD	Ghannouchi ME	Caid Essebsi NT	Aïdi BW	Hamdi CA	Brahim AT	Zenaidi	Jalloul NT	Jebali	Riahi	Chebbi MD
	23 June 2019	Yassine Brahim announces that he will not run for the election																						
	18 June 2019	Amendments to the electoral law approved by the ARP																						
Emrhod Consulting	14–17 June 2019	1200	5.8%	26.5%	15.2%	5%	1.5%	2.3%	1.5%	1.2%	1.9%	–	1.2%	–	1.9%	–	–	–	–	–	–	–	–	–
Benchmark Consulting	June 2019	1002	10.1%	7.9%	19.2%	11.6%	5.6%	6.8%	2.1%	1%	–	–	–	–	–	–	–	–	–	–	–	–	–	–
Sigma Conseil	1–8 June 2019	2706	7.4%	23.8%	23.2%	10.8%	6.3%	6.6%	3.9%	1.8%	1%	0.9%	4%	–	1.6%	1.8%	–	1%	0.9%	–	–	1.4%	–	–
Benchmark Consulting	2–6 May 2019		9.5%	–	17.5%	14.3%	4.4%	10.7%	5.9%	2.7%	–	–	–	–	2.7%	2.1%	–	–	–	–	–	–	–	–
Sigma Conseil	2–3 May 2019	787	7.4%	21.8%	22.4%	12.4%	4.5%	4.5%	3.4%	0.8%	–	–	3.8%	4%	1.4%	1.8%	–	1.4%	–	–	–	1.8%	–	1.3%
Elka Consulting	29 April - 3 May 2019	1216	4%	32%	17%	6%	7%	3%	3%	2%	5%	–	–	–	–	2%	–	1%	1%	–	1%	–	–	–
Emrhod Consulting	27–30 April 2019	1000	9.8%	8.1%	7.5%	5.2%	3.2%	2.8%	2.4%	1.6%	1.2%	1%	1%	0.8%	0.8%	0.8%	0.5%	0.5%	0.5%	0.2%	–	–	–	–
	6 April 2019	Beji Caid Essebsi announces that he will not seek re-election																						
Emrhod Consulting	27–29 March 2019	1500	14.6%	0.2%	13.3%	5.7%	2.7%	0.3%	0.4%	0.3%	0.5%	0.2%	0.1%	0.8%	0.8%	0.5%	0.2%	0.1%	–	0.2%	–	–	–	–
IIEOP and FSSA	March 2019		20%	–	19.2%	7.4%	9.2%	–	5.2%	4%	–	–	–	12.5%	–	5.7%	–	–	–	–	–	–	–	–
Sigma Conseil	March 2019		19.3%	1.3%	12.1%	7.1%	11.7%	4.7%	5.3%	6.7%	2.8%	–	2.3%	1.9%	3.1%	6.7%	–	3.3%	–	–	–	1.6%	–	–
Emrhod Consulting	22–24 February 2019	1054	13.7%	–	4.4%	4.6%	5.2%	1.3%	0.2%	1.8%	2.3%	0.5%	0.7%	2.4%	1.1%	4.8%	–	0.5%	–	–	0.5%	0.3%	–	–
	16 February 2019	Samia Abbou announces that she will not run for the election																						
Sigma Conseil	11–14 February 2019	805	13.8%	–	5.6%	1.2%	4%	1.1%	1.3%	2%	1.9%	–	1.3%	1.3%	1.4%	4.9%	–	1.5%	0.3%	–	0.5%	0.7%	–	0.3%
	12 January 2019	Rached Ghannouchi announces that he will not run for the election																						
Emrhod Consulting	24–26 December 2018	1027	8%	–	4.8%	0.5%	3.8%	2.5%	0.9%	1.8%	3.2%	0.3%	1.2%	2.7%	0.8%	6.2%	–	0.2%	0.3%	–	0.3%	–	0.9%	0.5%
IIEOP and FSSA	21–25 December 2018	1203	16.6%	–	14.4%	–	12%	–	–	–	–	–	–	14.2%	–	–	–	–	–	–	–	–	–	–
Emrhod Consulting	16–19 November 2018	965	11.8%	–	0.4%	0.2%	6.2%	3.7%	1%	1.5%	1.8%	1%	2%	2.1%	0.5%	8.6%	–	–	0.2%	–	1%	–	1.2%	0.3%
Election results	23 November 2014		N/A				33.43%	N/A		7.82%	0.80%	N/A	1.27%	N/A		39.46%	N/A	5.75%	N/A	0.74%	N/A		5.55%	1.04%

== See also ==
- 2019 Tunisian presidential election
- 2019 in Tunisia
- List of elections in 2019
