= 2022–23 Tunisian parliamentary election =

- 17 December 2022 (first round); 29 January 2023 (second round)
- All 161 seats in the Assembly of the Representatives of the People; 81 seats needed for a majority
- Turnout: 11.22% (first round) ▼30.48pp 11.40% (second round)
Party	Leader	Vote %	Seats	+/–
Independents	N/A	100	154	+142
This lists parties that won seats. See the complete results below.
Prime Minister before	Prime Minister after
Najla Bouden; Independent	Najla Bouden; Independent

Parliamentary elections were held in Tunisia on 17 December 2022 to elect the third Assembly of the Representatives of the People. Run-offs were held on 29 January 2023 in the vast majority of constituencies after only 21 candidates were elected in the first round.

Voter turnout in the first round was just 11.22 percent, as the election was boycotted by most opposition parties.

== Background ==
On 25 July 2021, Republic Day, after months of political crisis between the President of the Republic and Assembly of the Representatives of the People, thousands of demonstrators rallied to call for the dissolution of the Assembly and regime change. These rallies are taking place as the health crisis around the COVID-19 pandemic escalates. On the same day, President Kais Saied dismissed the government of Hichem Mechichi and suspended the activities of the Assembly, using the emergency powers provided for in article 80 of the Constitution of Tunisia. The country's largest parliamentary party, Ennahda, and its leader, Assembly Speaker Rached Ghannouchi, condemned the president's actions, calling them a coup d'état. Some political analysts and lawyers have also called the events a coup d'état.

On 22 September, Saied confirmed by decree the extension of the validity of the decisions, as well as the dissolution of the Provisional Body Responsible for Checking the Constitutionality of Bills, and decided to suspend the payment of wages and benefits provided to the chairman of the Assembly of Representatives of the People and its members, and granted himself the right to rule by decree, de facto restoring legislative power. His decision was criticized by most of the parties represented in Parliament.

On 29 September, the President instructed Najla Bouden to form a new government. Thus, she became the first female head of government in the country and throughout the Arab world.

From 15 January to 20 March 2022, an electronic consultation took place on the reforms to be proposed in anticipation of the referendum. During the ballot, which was the subject of a very low turnout, the options of a transition to a presidential system and to a single-member ballot for the legislative elections prevailed.

On 30 March 2022, 120 deputies, under the chairmanship of the second vice-president of the Assembly Tarek Fetiti, met in a virtual session to vote for the end of the exceptional measures in force since 25 July. The same day, Kaïs Saïed dissolved Parliament, which the Constitution forbids during the period when the state of exception is applied, and threatens the deputies with legal proceedings.

On 6 April, Kais Saied announced the holding of the parliamentary ballot according to a two-round uninominal majority ballot. On 5 September, he announced that the electoral law will be drafted taking into consideration the recommendations of the supporters of the 25 July process, and that the rest of the political class will be excluded from this process. The electoral law will have to be published no later than 16 September to meet the deadlines.

On 25 July 2022, the new Constitution was adopted by constitutional referendum with 94.6% of the votes and a 30.5% turnout. A new electoral law was then published by decree on 15 September.

== Electoral system ==
The 217 members of the Assembly of the Representatives of the People were previously elected by closed list proportional representation in 33 multi-member constituencies (27 in Tunisia and 6 representing Tunisian expatriates) with seats allocated using the largest remainder method and a mandated zipper system: alternating female and male candidates on the list, and a male and female candidate under the age of 35 in the top four in constituencies with four or more seats. However, on 16 September 2022, President Kais Saied introduced a new electoral system and reduced the number of parliamentarians.

In this election, the reduced 161 members of the Assembly of the Representatives of the People (now the lower house of a bicameral legislature) will be elected via the two-round system in single-member constituencies. Additionally, publicly funded elections were abolished, meaning private support and self-financing must be used, and the law introduced recall referendums, which can be triggered if signatures equal to 10% voters who voted for them submit a request in favor of one to the parliament. Party affiliation of the candidates will no longer appear on ballots.

== Campaign ==
=== Procedure ===
The ISIE publishes the electoral calendar on 23 September 2022. In accordance with the decree of 15 September calling on voters to elect the members of the Assembly of People's Representatives, the date of the legislative elections is set for 17 December 2022 on national territory, and from 15 to 17 December abroad.

Automatic registration of voters who turn 18 before 16 December is carried out from 21 September. The electoral period begins on 25 September at midnight, when it is forbidden to broadcast and publish the results of opinion polls related to the elections. The updating of those registered in the electoral register as well as the change of polling stations take place from 26 September to 13 October. The final list of voters is published on 14 October, after the receipt of appeals against the preliminary lists on 29 and 30 September, examined on 1 and 2 October.

The submission of applications is open from 17 October to 24 October. They are studied by the ISIE on 13 October to publish the next day, 1 November, the list of candidates on the premises of the ISIE. The final list of candidates is announced on 21 November. The election campaign begins on 25 November. It ends on 13 December abroad and 15 December on national territory, respective dates after which the electoral silence begins.

The preliminary results are announced on 20 December, and the final results on 19 January 2023.

=== Boycott ===
The National Salvation Front, chaired by Ahmed Najib Chebbi, announced that it was boycotting the legislative election, comparing it to the elections that were held under President Zine El Abidine Ben Ali. This coalition, which had also boycotted the constitutional referendum, is made up of several political parties including Ennahda, Al Amal, Dignity Coalition, Heart of Tunisia, Movement Party and the Citizens against the Coup d'Etat movement, as well as members of civil society, created to oppose the coup of 25 July 2021.

The Coordination of Social Democratic Parties, made up of Ettakatol, Republican Party, Democratic Current, Workers' Party and the Democratic Modernist Pole also announced its boycott of the election. The Soumoud coalition also calls on citizens to boycott the election.

After calling on the democratic and progressive forces to come together to prepare common candidacies for the legislative elections, and proposing a roadmap in the event of victory, the Free Destourian Party (PDL) finally announced on 7 September that it would not take part in the legislative elections, considering them a "state crime", and considering the unilateral revision of the election law as an "illegal". It also compares the legislative elections to an appointment of members of a "council similar to that of the Shura, as in Islamist countries" and condemns the non-respect of international standards in the process. The party also announces a nationwide day of anger and protest on 17 September. The boycott of the elections by the PDL risks weakening the legitimacy of the results given that the party was the leader in opinion polls.

Afek Tounes, Machrouu Tounes, the Social Democratic Path and the National Alliance party of Néji Jalloul are also boycotting the legislative election.

The National Syndicate of Tunisian Journalists denounces the situation of the confiscated media and threatens to boycott the election in the event of a lack of dialogue with the government.

=== Declared candidacies ===
- The Tunisia Forward announced that the party will participate in the legislative election despite reservations on certain articles of the electoral law which could have repercussions on the results, according to the movement. They also call for the formation of an electoral front bringing together all the progressive forces that support the 25 July process. Party secretary general Abid Briki would not stand as a candidate
- The Democratic Patriots' Unified Party announced that it would take part in the elections with the aim of uniting the Tunisian left. Its leader and former MP Mongi Rahoui would stand as a candidate.
- The Tunisian National Party, chaired by Faouzi Elloumi, announced that it will support all members and activists of the party who wish to stand for election.
- The 25th of July Movement announces its participation in the legislative election. However, they are threatening to boycott the elections if the President of the Republic does not take into consideration the recommendations of his entourage. They finally participate in the elections with 141 candidates including 15 women, without the participation of the members of the political bureau of the movement following their rejection of the sponsorship criteria.
- The Third Republic Party, chaired by Olfa Hamdi, announces its participation in the legislative election.
- Ahmed Chaftar, member of the explanatory campaign of the 2022 constitutional referendum, announced that he will be a candidate in the constituency of Zarzis.
- Fatma Mseddi, the former MP for Nidaa Tounes, announces her candidacy for the Sfax South constituency.
- Meriem Laghmani, former member of the Heart of Tunisia party, announces her candidacy in the Kef region.
- The "For the People to Triumph" political initiative, founded on 9 October 2022 and bringing together 25 independent candidates supporting the 25 July process, is expected to participate in the election. The former president of the bar association and member of the initiative, Brahim Bouderbala, confirms his personal candidacy for the legislative elections as well as the group's participation in the elections.
- Lawyer Mounir Ben Salha announces his candidacy for the legislative election.
- Actor and director Atef Ben Hassine submits his candidacy in the Chebba constituency on 26 October.

=== Party participation ===
On 29 September 2022, ISIE spokesperson Mohamed Tlili Mansri announced that political parties are banned from campaigning for the legislative elections and that candidates must campaign individually. He adds that it is forbidden for candidates to indicate in their application file the party they represent. Following the denunciation of these prohibitions by politicians, the Head of State specifies that political parties can participate in the electoral campaign but only by supporting them in a personal capacity. The ISIE spokesperson also clarified that parties can support candidates without taking part in the campaign, and that their candidates can use the official logo and program of the political party during their campaign. However, the parties having decided to boycott the elections cannot be concerned by the legislative elections.

The ISIE spokesperson announces on 3 October that political parties and associations cannot finance legislative candidates since they are not considered as natural persons who can participate in private financing.

On 26 October the secretary general of the People's Movement Zouhair Maghzaoui announced that his party will present candidates in at least 120 constituencies, including deputies from the last legislature.

=== Illegal sponsorship case ===
On 6 October 2022, the ISIE announced that some potential legislative candidates had attempted to illegally obtain sponsorships by exploiting public resources, abusing their power or in return for compensation. An investigation is therefore opened and the suspected persons are arrested.

According to the President of the Republic, among the offenses are the refusal of the legalization of signatures of sponsorships by municipal councils, the facilitation of the legalization of signatures for certain candidates, or the fact of "terrorizing citizens" to obtain their sponsorships.

Faced with this affair, Kais Saied compares sponsorships to "merchandise that is sold and bought" and evokes, on 8 October 2022, the need to amend the electoral law a second time. The president of the ISIE reacts to this statement by saying that it would be preferable not to amend the law when the electoral period has begun and sponsorships have already been collected. It specifies that it will not be possible to renounce the sponsorships that the candidates received before a potential second amendment. He also insists on the importance of examining the situation before making technical adjustments to the law and of consulting the ISIE at this stage of the campaign.

On 10 October, the vice-president of the ISIE Maher Jedidi confirms that the presidency of the Republic is preparing a new amendment to the electoral law and that the independent body will have an advisory role when it is ready. He insists all the same on the importance of keeping the candidacy conditions as they are and that, if certain technical points were changed, the ISIE will have its say, suggesting a mistrust of such an action on the part of the president by the ISIE.

== Opinion polls ==
Ennahda Heart of Tunisia Free Destourian Party Democratic Current Dignity Coalition People's Movement Tahya Tounes Afek Tounes Nidaa Tounes Popular Front Party of Kais Saied Party of Safi Saïd

Parties boycotting the election are marked in italics.

The polls also feature the hypothetical parties of Kais Saied and Safi Said.

Polling firm	Fieldwork date	Sample	Ennahda	Qalb	PDL	Tayyar	Karama	People's	Tahya	Afek	Nidaa	Popular Front	Party of Kais Saied	Party of Safi Saïd	Ind.	Others	Abst.	Lead
	25 September 2022	Beginning of the electoral period prohibiting the publication of opinion polls																
	3 June 2022	Beginning of the pre-referendum phase banning the publication of opinion polls																
Emrhod	26–31 May 2022	1,060	16	1	33	5	3	4	–	4	–	–	20	2	7	5	62	13.0
Sigma Conseil	May 2022	1,005	8.7	–	29.9	3.8	–	4.9	–	–	–	–	26.2				57.8	3.7
Emrhod	Apr 2022	980	15	1	35	4	1	5	–	4	–	–	19	1	6	9	63	16.0
Sigma Conseil	Apr 2022	1,715	9.7	–	33.1	4.6	–	6.2	–	–		–	26.2				69.6	6.9
Emrhod	Mar 2022	1,080	13	1	34	3	2	6	–	3	–	–	24	1	5	8	65	10.0
Sigma Conseil	Mar 2022	2,009	10.4	–	30.1	–	2.5	3.3	–	–		–	29.2				71.6	0.9
Emrhod	Feb 2022	1,100	13	1	33	3	1	4	–	2	–	–	25	3	4	11	64	8.0
Sigma Conseil	Feb 2022	1,788	10.4	–	32.6	–	–	4.1	–	–		–	30.6	2.9			67	2.0
Emrhod	Jan 2022	1,060	14	1	34	2	2	5	–	2	–	–	25	–	4	11	62	9.0
Sigma Conseil	Jan 2022	2,000	9.9	–	34.0	3.3	–	4.5	–	–		–	33.0	–			72.5	1.0
Emrhod	Dec 2021	1,200	16	2	33	4	2	6	–	2	–	–	21	–	5	–	65	12.0
Sigma Conseil	Dec 2021	1,940	16.8	–	36.2	4.8	–	6.7	–	–		–	20.8	–			67.2	15.4
Emrhod	Nov 2021	1,150	15	2	29	4	3	5	–	3	–	–	26	–	6	6	68	3.0
Sigma Conseil	Nov 2021	1,638	10.5	–	38.8	3.4	–	5.3	–	–	–	–	21.4	–			71.3	17.4
Emrhod	Oct 2021	1,190	14	2	29	5	1	4	1	–	–	–	35	–	6	3	72	6
Sigma Conseil	Oct 2021	2,002	9.5	–	32.2	3.6	–	6.7	–	–		–	30.7	–			66.1	1.5
Emrhod	Sep 2021	900	11.6	–	17.6	2.1	2.1	3.0	–	–	–	–	48.1	2.1	7.3	6.0	76.7	30.5
Sigma Conseil	Sep 2021	1,983	12.1	–	34.0	6.1	–	3.5	–	–	–	–	26.1	–	–	–	70.2	7.9
Emrhod	Aug 2021	1,400	15	3	30	4	2	–	–	–	2	–	20	2	18	–	69	10.0
Sigma Conseil	Aug 2021	1,707	10.9	7.8	30.8	5.9	–	–	–	–	–	–	20.1	–			74.6	10.7
	25 Jul 2021	Start of the political crisis. President Kais Saied invokes article 80 of the Constitution.																
Emrhod	Jun 2021	1,400	18	7	37	6	4	3	2	1	2	–	–	3	8	–	60	19.0
Sigma Conseil	Jun 2021	1,882	18.7	11.5	38.6	5.7	5.3	3.4				–	–	–	–	–	61.3	19.9
Emrhod	May 2021	1,400	20	8	34	7	2	3	2	1	–	–	–	3	10	–	52	14.0
Sigma Conseil	May 2021	2,003	18.6	10.1	36	–	3.8	5.8	–	–	–	–	–	–			62.1	17.4
Emrhod	Apr 2021	1,000	26	6	37	9	3	2	2	1	–	–	–	3	4	–	68	11.0
Sigma Conseil	Apr 2021	1,997	20.4	11.8	38.5	3.8	4.1	2.2	–	–	–	–	3.1	2.9	–	–	58.8	26.7
Emrhod	Mar 2021	1,400	22	8	39	6	2	4	2	2	–	–	–	2	5	–	72	17.0
Sigma Conseil	Mar 2021	2,007	18.4	7.8	43.6	4.8	4.3	–	–	–	–	–	–	–	–	–	57	25.2
Emrhod	Feb 2021	1,420	20	6	42	6	4	3	2	1	–	–	–	2	5	–	68	22.0
Sigma Conseil	Feb 2021	2,009	16.8	10.7	36.1	6	6.3	–	–	–	–	–	–	–	–	–	67	19.3
Emrhod	Jan 2021	–	19	4	41	8	7	3	2	1	–	–	–	5	5	–	70	22.0
Sigma Conseil	Jan 2021	2,013	15.4	8.7	41.0	5.5	9.1	–	–	–	–	–	1	4	–	–	68.7	25.6
Emrhod	Dec 2020	–	20	7	38	4	5	2	2	–	1	–	–	3	8	–	65	18.0
Emrhod	Nov 2020	–	19	8	38	4	5	2	2	–	–	–	–	2	9	–	68	19.0
Sigma Conseil	Nov 2020	–	17	9.6	35.4	5.9	8.8	–	–	–	–	–	–	–	–	–	74.7	18.4
Emrhod	Oct 2020	1,000	21	7	33	5	5	3	3	–	–	–	–	2	6	–	–	12.0
Sigma Conseil	Oct 2020	2,038	21.1	13.7	26.5	7.2	6.9	5.9	–	–	–	–	3.3	3.6	–	–	72.8	5.4
Emrhod	Sep 2020	1,000	23	8	36	5	6	2	3	–	–	–	–	1	6	–	–	13.0
Sigma Conseil	Sep 2020	2,011	23.6	11.4	27.2	5.6	5.5	–	–	–	–	–	–	–	–	–	65.6	3.6
Sigma Conseil	Aug 2020	803	21.9	10	35.8	6.6	6.3	5.7	3	–	3	0.5	0.5	1	–	5.7	62.4	13.9
Emrhod	Jul 2020	–	23	9	28	8	4	2	4	–	–	–	–	–	2	6	–	5.0
Sigma Conseil	Jul 2020	–	24.1	11	29	7	6.7	–	–	–	3.7	–	–	–	–	–	61.3	4.9
Emrhod	Jun 2020	1,000	23	11	22	8	7	5	7	–	–	–	–	5	6	–	–	1.0
Sigma Conseil	May 2020		24.3	12.1	22.2	8.3	–	–	–	–	–	–	–	–	–	–	–	2.1
Emrhod	Apr 2020	–	22	16	22	12	11	6	7	–	–	–	–	6	5	–	–	Tie
Sigma Conseil	Mar 2020	787	24.3	11.4	22	10.9	6.9	–	–	–	–	–	–	–	–	–	–	2.3
Emrhod	Feb 2020	1,100	7.4	7.2	7.6	5.2	4.5	–	–	–	1.2	–	–	2.9	–	2.5	–	0.2
Sigma Conseil	Jan 2020	–	15.9	7.5	16.6	11.3	10.2	4.7	4.5	–	2.6	–	2.2	3.8	1.9	10.6	43.0	0.7
Emrhod	Dec 2019	–	6.9	7.5	7.8	4.7	4.9	2.5	3.0	–	2.0	–	–	1.5	–	3.8	–	0.3
Emrhod	Nov 2019	–	12.5	13.9	11.4	7.9	9.6	3.6	6.4	–	3.6	3.2	–	8.6	4.6	14.6	–	1.4
2019 election	6 Oct 2019	2,858,187	19.6	14.6	6.6	6.4	5.9	4.5	4.1	1.5	1.5	1.1	–		2.9	31.1	–	5.0

== Results ==
Party	First round			Second round			Total seats	+/–
Party	Votes	%	Seats	Votes	%	Seats	Total seats	+/–
Independents	956,016	100.00	23	849,104	100.00	131	154	+142
Vacant							7	—
Total	956,016	100.00	23	849,104	100.00	131	161	–56
Valid votes	956,016	93.23		849,104	94.87			
Invalid votes	45,613	4.45		28,524	3.19			
Blank votes	23,789	2.32		17,374	1.94			
Total votes	1,025,418	100.00		895,002	100.00			
Registered voters/turnout	9,136,502	11.22		7,853,447	11.40			
Source: ISIE

== Analysis ==
Turnout for the election in the first round was 8.8% at 18h, a record low not just for Tunisia, but for the entirety of north Africa.

According to the President of the opposition National Salvation Front coalition, Ahmed Najib Chebbi, President Saied lost legal legitimacy in the face of the 91% abstention rate.

The elections were experiencing a historically low turnout, initially estimated at just under 10% of registered voters, then refined to just over 11%, compared to 41% in 2019. The rejection of the political class in general, coupled with the calls for a boycott on the part of the main parties as well as the disinterest in an assembly with considerably restricted powers, lead as expected to a massive disaffection of the voters, who are more concerned about the economic conditions which affect the country.

A total of 23 candidates are elected in the first round, including ten automatically in the absence of opponents: seven in Tunisia itself and three in the diaspora. Of the ten seats reserved for the diaspora, only the last three are filled, the other seven remaining vacant in the absence of candidates in the constituencies. The 25th of July Movement, a pro-Saied party, which presented 152 candidates, won 10 seats in the first round, and 65 of its candidates ended up in the second round. The People's Movement, which critically supported the head of state and nominated 87 candidates, won a place in the first round.
