= Fakhfakh Cabinet =

- Cabinet of Tunisia

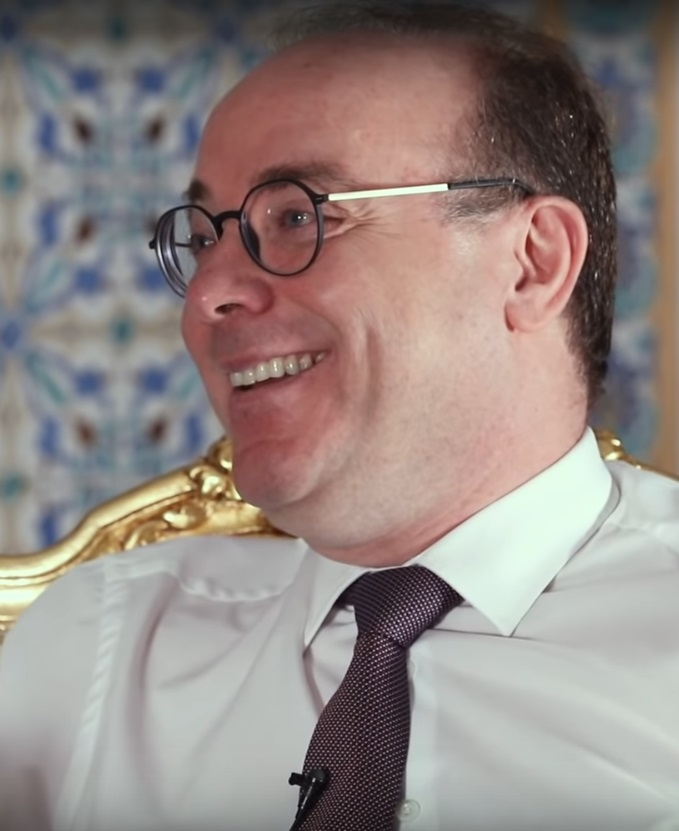
- Date formed: 27 February 2020
- Date dissolved: 2 September 2020 (6 months and 6 days)

People and organisations
- Head of state: Kais Saied
- Head of government: Elyes Fakhfakh
- Total no. of members: 33 (incl. Prime Minister)
- Member parties: Ennahda, Democratic Current, People’s Movement, Tahya Tounes, Tunisian Alternative, Nidaa Tounes, Ettakatol, Independent politicians External support: Machrouu Tounes, Afek Tounes, Aïch Tounsi, Republican People’s Union
- Status in legislature: Coalition government
- Opposition parties: Heart of Tunisia, Free Destourian Party, Dignity Coalition, Popular Front, Democratic and Social Union (VDS-PR-MDS), Farmers' Voice Party

History
- Election: 2019 Tunisian parliamentary election
- Legislature term: II legislature (2019-2021)
- Predecessor: Chahed Cabinet (2016–2020)
- Successor: Mechichi Cabinet (2020–2021)

The Fakhfakh Cabinet was the 30th government of the Tunisian Republic. It was formed by Elyes Fakhfakh on the appointment of President Kais Saied.

== History ==
=== Background and formation ===
The October 2019 general election resulted in a highly fractured parliament, with no party or list receiving more than 20 percent of the vote. No party or alliance obtained enough seats for a majority. Despite losing seats, Ennahdha became the largest party due to the fracturing of votes between other smaller, newer, or less established parties. According to article 89 of the Tunisian Constitution the President of the Republic shall within one week of the declaration of the definitive election results ask the candidate of the party or the electoral coalition which won the largest number of seats in the parliament to form a government, within a one-month period, extendable once. On 15 November 2019 leader of Ennahda Rached Ghannouchi presented Habib Jemli for the post of prime minister when he met Kais Saied at the presidential palace Jemli has been given one month, with the potential to renew for another month, to form a coalition government. Although Jemli was independent it was known he was very close to Ennahdha. He presented his list of ministers on 2 January 2020. On 10 January 2020, he failed to gain the confidence of the Tunisian parliament.

== Cabinet members ==
Office	Name	Party	Photo
Head of Government	Elyes Fakhfakh	Ettakatol	
Minister of State, Minister attached to the Prime Minister in charge of Civil Service, Governance and the Fight against Corruption	Mohamed Abbou	Democratic Current	
Minister of State, Minister of Transport and Logistics	Anouar Maârouf	Ennahda	
Minister of Interior	Hichem Mechichi	Independent	
Minister of Defence	Imed Hazgui	Independent	
Minister of Justice	Thouraya Jeribi Khémiri	Independent	
Minister of Foreign Affairs	Noureddine Erray	Independent	
Minister of Finance	Nizar Yaïche	Independent	
Minister of Religious Affairs	Ahmed Adhoum	Independent	
Minister of Social Affairs	Habib Kchaou	Independent	
Minister of Culture	Chiraz Latiri	Independent	
Minister of Women, Family, Children and Elderly and Government Spokesperson	Asma Shiri	Independent	
Minister of Industry	Salah Ben Youssef	Independent	
Minister of Energy, Mines and Energy Transition	Mongi Marzouk	Independent	
Minister of Agriculture, Fisheries and Water Resources	Oussama Kheriji	Independent	
Minister of Communication Technologies and Digital Transformation	Mohamed Fadhel Kraiem	Independent	
Minister of Higher Education, Scientific Research	Slim Choura	Ennahda	
Minister of Health	Abdellatif Mekki	Ennahda	
Minister of the Local Affairs	Lotfi Zitoun	Ennahda	
Minister of Youth and Sports	Ahmed Gaâloul	Ennahda	
Minister of Equipment, Housing and Regional Planning	Moncef Sliti	Ennahda	
Minister of State Domains and Land Affairs	Ghazi Chaouachi	Democratic Current	
Minister of Education	Mohamed Hamdi	Democratic Current	
Minister of Employment and Vocational Training	Fethi Belhaj	People’s Movement	
Minister of Commerce	Mohamed Msilini	People’s Movement	
Minister of Development, Investment and International Cooperation	Selim Azzabi	Tahya Tounes	
Minister of Environment	Chokri Belhassen	Tahya Tounes	
Minister of Tourism and Handicrafts	Mohamed Ali Toumi	Tunisian Alternative	
Minister in charge of Relations with Parliament	Ali Hafsi Jeddi	Nidaa Tounes	
Minister responsible for major national projects	Lobna Jribi	Independent	
Minister in charge of Human Rights and Relations with constitutional bodies and civil society	Ayachi Hammami	Independent	
Secretary of State for Foreign Affairs	Selma Ennaifer	Independent	
Secretary of State for Water Resources	Akissa Bahri	Independent	
