= 2019 Tunisian presidential election =

- 15 September 2019 (first round); 13 October 2019 (second round)
- Turnout: 48.98% (first round) ▼14.20pp 55.02% (second round) ▼5.32pp
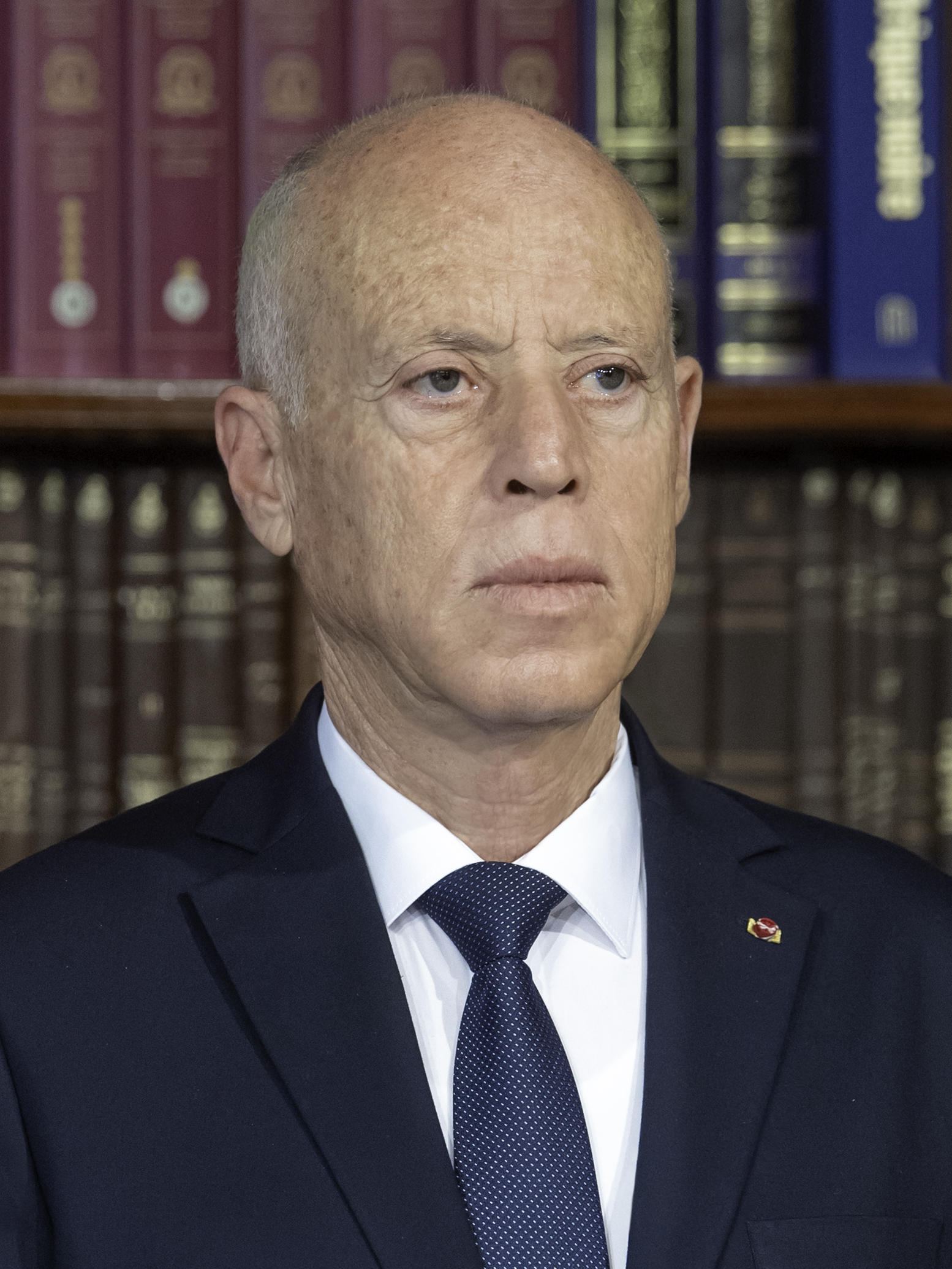

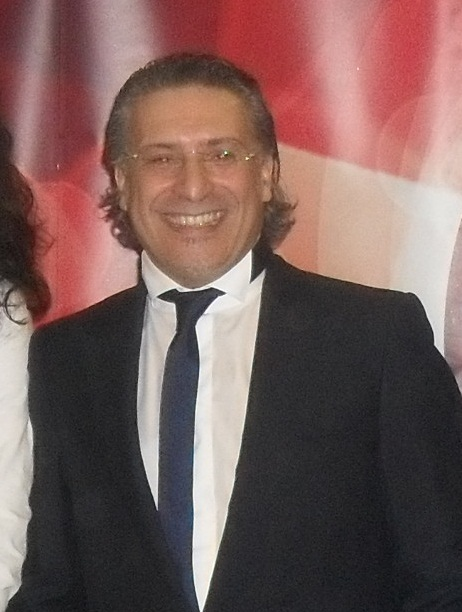
| Candidate | Kais Saied | Nabil Karoui |
| Party | Independent | Heart of Tunisia |
| Popular vote | 2,777,931 | 1,042,894 |
| Percentage | 72.71% | 27.29% |
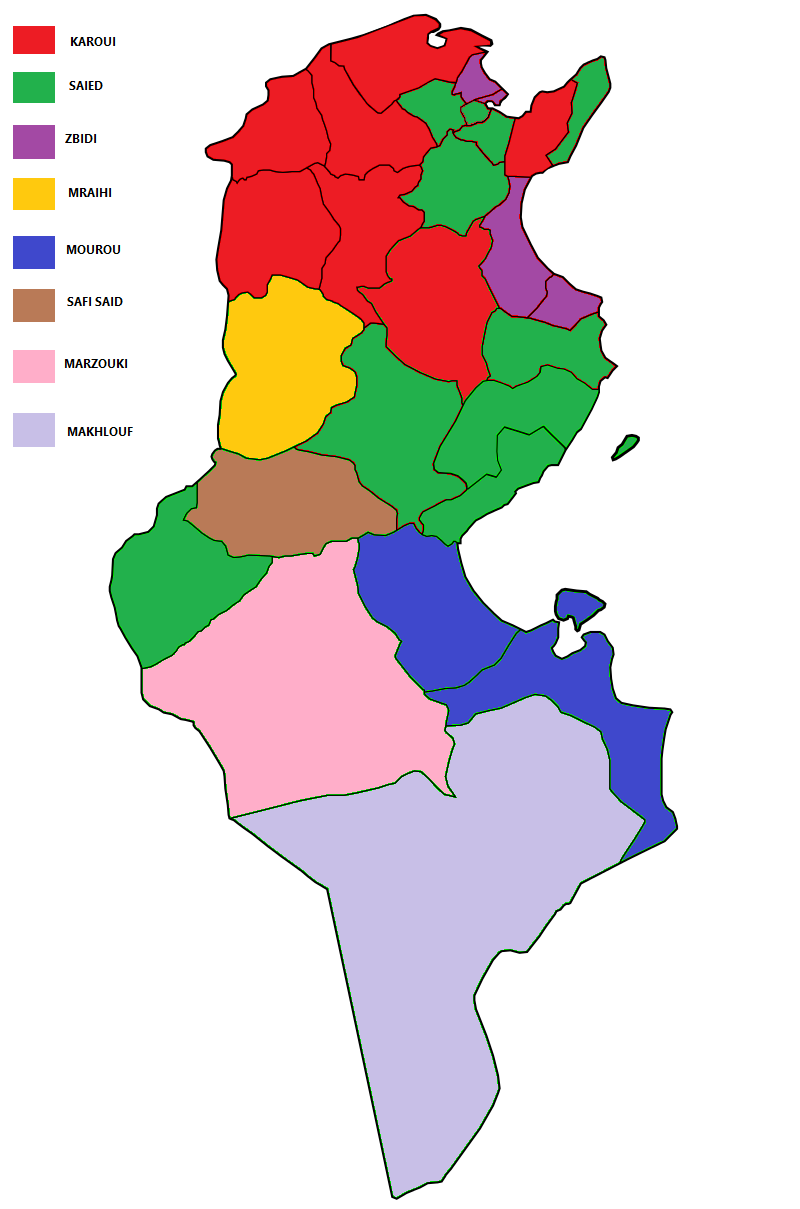
President before election
Mohamed Ennaceur (interim)
Nidaa Tounes
Elected President
Kais Saied
Independent

Presidential elections were held in Tunisia on 15 September 2019, the second direct vote for the presidency since the 2011 revolution. The elections had originally been planned for 17 and 24 November, but were brought forward after the death of incumbent President Beji Caid Essebsi on 25 July to ensure that a new president would take office within 90 days, as required by the constitution.

As no candidate received a majority of the vote in the first round, a runoff was held on 13 October between the top two candidates, Kais Saied and Nabil Karoui. Saied won the second round with 73% of the vote.

== Background ==
In April 2019, incumbent President Beji Caid Essebsi said that he would not seek re-election, opening the candidate field to other candidates. However, Essebsi died on 25 July at age 92, with five months left in his term. The President of the Assembly of the Representatives of the People, Mohamed Ennaceur, became interim president, according to the Constitutional provision for presidential succession. According to Article 84 of the Tunisian constitution, an interim president may serve for a maximum of 90 days, meaning Ennaceur's role was due to expire on 23 October 2019. In order to comply with this, the High Authority for Elections announced the election will be held sooner than scheduled, being moved up from 17 and 24 November to 15 September and 13 October.

== Electoral system ==
The President of Tunisia is directly elected by universal suffrage using the two-round system. If no candidate receives a majority of the vote in the first round, a second round is held between the top two candidates. Candidates must be at least 35 years old on the day of filing for candidacy, and are also required to be Muslim. Candidates must have Tunisian citizenship, and are required to give up any other citizenship they hold.

=== Electoral reform controversy ===
On 18 June 2019, the Assembly of Representatives passed amendments to the country's electoral law, accused by some of blocking candidates like Nabil Karoui and Olfa Terras from being eligible to run in the election. The amendments prohibited those with a criminal record, as well as those who run charitable organizations or received foreign funding for political advertising in the year preceding an election. On 25 June, members of Nidaa Tounes and the Popular Front filed a motion in the Assembly of Representatives, calling the move unconstitutional.

== Candidates ==
=== Approved candidates ===
| Image | Candidates | Party | Reference |
|---|---|---|---|
| | Mohamed Abbou | Democratic Current | |
| | Saïd Aïdi | Beni Watani | |
| | Hatem Boulabiar | Independent | |
| | Abid Briki | Tunisia Forward | |
| | Youssef Chahed | Long Live Tunisia | |
| | Selma Elloumi | Al Amal | |
| | Elyes Fakhfakh | Democratic Forum for Labour and Liberties | |
| | Hechmi Hamdi | Current of Love | |
| | Hamma Hammami | Popular Front | |
| | Néji Jalloul | Independent | |
| | Hamadi Jebali | Independent | |
| | Mehdi Jomaa | Tunisian Alternative | |
| | Nabil Karoui | Heart of Tunisia | |
| | Seifeddine Makhlouf | Dignity Coalition | |
| | Omar Mansour | Independent | |
| | Mohsen Marzouk | Machrouu Tounes | |
| | Moncef Marzouki | Al-Irada | |
| | Abdelfattah Mourou | Ennahda Movement | |
| | Abir Moussi | Free Destourian Party | |
| | Lotfi Mraïhi | Republican People's Union | |
| | Mohamed Esghaier Nouri | Independent | |
| | Mongi Rahoui | Popular Front | |
| | Slim Riahi | New National Union | N/A |
| | Safi Saïd | Independent (supported by People's Movement) | |
| | Kais Saied | Independent | |
| | Abdelkrim Zbidi | Independent (supported by Nidaa Tounes) | |

=== Rejected candidates ===
- Mounir Baatour, the first openly LGBT candidate in the Arab world. Leader of the Liberal Party.

=== Candidates who declined to run ===
- Samia Abbou, Member of the Assembly representing the Democratic Current.
- Beji Caid Essebsi, President of Tunisia at the start of election campaign. Leader of Nidaa Tounes.

== Televised debates ==
For the first time in the country's history, presidential election debates were held in Tunisia. Organised by the Munathara Initiative and sanctioned by Tunisia's election authority, ISIE, the debates were held on 7, 8 and 9 September 2019. The debates were broadcast on 11 public and private Tunisian TV channels, on Al Jazeera, as well as on Algerian, Libyan, and Iraqi TV stations. Some three million viewers, or 42 percent of the country's registered voters, followed the first debate. The figure does not include live streaming audiences or audiences outside Tunisia.

Participating candidates in the ISIE-sanctioned debates
Candidate
| Candidate | P Present A Absent I Invited O Invited to other debate W Withdrawn | | |
| Candidate | 1A - 7 Sept | 1B - 8 Sept | 1C - 9 Sept |
|---|---|---|---|
| Abbou | P | O | O |
| Aïdi | O | O | P |
| Boulabiar | O | P | O |
| Briki | P | O | O |
| Chahed | O | O | P |
| Elloumi | O | O | P |
| Fakhfakh | O | P | O |
| Hamdi | O | P | O |
| Hammami | O | O | P |
| Jalloul | P | O | O |
| Jebali | O | P | O |
| Jomaa | P | O | O |
| Karoui | A | O | O |
| Makhlouf | O | O | P |
| Mansour | P | O | O |
| Marzouk | O | P | O |
| Marzouki | P | O | O |
| Mourou | P | O | O |
| Moussi | P | O | O |
| Mraihi | O | P | O |
| Nouri | O | P | O |
| Rahoui | O | P | O |
| Riahi | O | O | A |
| Safi Saïd | O | O | P |
| Kais Saied | O | O | P |
| Zbidi | O | P | O |

== Results ==
| Candidate | Party | First round | | Second round | |
| Candidate | Party | Votes | % | Votes | % |
|---|---|---|---|---|---|
| Kais Saied | Independent | 620,711 | 18.40 | 2,777,931 | 72.71 |
| Nabil Karoui | Heart of Tunisia | 525,517 | 15.58 | 1,042,894 | 27.29 |
| Abdelfattah Mourou | Ennahda Movement | 434,530 | 12.88 | | |
| Abdelkrim Zbidi | Independent | 361,864 | 10.73 | | |
| Youssef Chahed | Long Live Tunisia | 249,049 | 7.38 | | |
| Safi Saïd | Independent | 239,951 | 7.11 | | |
| Lotfi Mraïhi | Republican People's Union | 221,190 | 6.56 | | |
| Seifeddine Makhlouf | Dignity Coalition | 147,351 | 4.37 | | |
| Abir Moussi | Free Destourian Party | 135,461 | 4.02 | | |
| Mohamed Abbou | Democratic Current | 122,287 | 3.63 | | |
| Moncef Marzouki | Movement Party | 100,338 | 2.97 | | |
| Mehdi Jomaa | Tunisian Alternative | 61,371 | 1.82 | | |
| Mongi Rahoui | Popular Front | 27,355 | 0.81 | | |
| Hechmi Hamdi | Current of Love | 25,284 | 0.75 | | |
| Hamma Hammami | Independent | 23,252 | 0.69 | | |
| Elyes Fakhfakh | Democratic Forum for Labour and Liberties | 11,532 | 0.34 | | |
| Saïd Aïdi | Beni Watani | 10,198 | 0.30 | | |
| Omar Mansour | Independent | 10,160 | 0.30 | | |
| Mohsen Marzouk | Machrouu Tounes | 7,376 | 0.22 | | |
| Hamadi Jebali | Independent | 7,364 | 0.22 | | |
| Néji Jalloul | Independent | 7,166 | 0.21 | | |
| Abid Briki | Tunisia Forward | 5,799 | 0.17 | | |
| Selma Elloumi Rekik | Al Amal | 5,093 | 0.15 | | |
| Mohamed Esghaier Nouri | Independent | 4,598 | 0.14 | | |
| Slim Riahi | New National Union | 4,472 | 0.13 | | |
| Hatem Boulabiar | Independent | 3,704 | 0.11 | | |
| Total | | 3,372,973 | 100.00 | 3,820,825 | 100.00 |
| Valid votes | | 3,372,973 | 97.34 | 3,820,825 | 98.17 |
| Invalid/blank votes | | 92,211 | 2.66 | 71,260 | 1.83 |
| Total votes | | 3,465,184 | 100.00 | 3,892,085 | 100.00 |
| Registered voters/turnout | | 7,074,566 | 48.98 | 7,074,566 | 55.02 |
Source: ISIE, ISIE
