= National Salvation Front (Tunisia) =

Political group in Tunisia

- Leader: Ahmed Najib Chebbi
- Presidium: Samira al-Shawashi; Johar bin Mubarak; Ridha Belhaj; Riad Al-Shuaibi; Omar Al-Saifawi; Samir Dilou; Yousry Al-Dali; Sami Al-Shabi; Mohammed Amin Al-Saeedani
- Founded: 31 May 2022
- Ideology: Anti-Kais Saied; Big tent

The “National Salvation Front” in Tunisia (NSFT) is a Tunisian political group headed by Ahmed Najib Chebbi, founded on 31 May 2022, 10 months after the political crisis in Tunisia. The Front includes several Tunisian political entities who oppose actions taken by President Kais Saied, including his suspension of the House of Representatives as well as other measures which the Front considers a coup against legitimate political rule. Among the front's participants are Ennahda Movement, Amal Movement, Tunisia Movement of Will, Dignity Coalition and Heart of Tunisia, Citizens’ Movement against the Coup, the Democratic Initiative, the National Salvation Meeting, the Tunisian Movement for Democracy, the Meeting for Tunisia, the Youth Meeting for Democracy and Social Justice, and the Coordination of Parliament Representatives. In April 2024, the National Salvation Front coalition announced that it was boycotting the 2024 presidential election, denouncing an “electoral farce”.

== Executive Body ==
It was announced that the executive body of the Front includes Ahmed Najib Chebbi, Samira al-Shawashi, Johar bin Mubarak, Rida Belhaj, Riad Al-Shuaibi, Omar Al-Saifawi, Samir Dilou, Yousry Al-Dali, Sami Al-Shabi, and Mohammed Amin Al-Saeedani.

== Democracy and Ennahda ==
NSFT have been accused of siding with Ennahda Movement and trying and bring it back to the political scene. On 20 August 2022, Najib Chebbi denied the claim that the front was trying to bring Ennahda back to power, and said that the front's ultimate objective is to restore democracy in the country.

== Members ==
Members
Name	Leader	Ideology	Position
Ennahda	Rached Ghannouchi	Islamic democracy	Centre-right
Al Amal	Selma Elloumi Rekik	Bourguibism	N/A
Movement Party	Moncef Marzouki	Social democracy	Centre-left
Dignity Coalition	Seifeddine Makhlouf	Islamism	Far-right
Heart of Tunisia	Nabil Karoui	Bourguibism	Centre
Citizens’ Movement against the Coup	N/A	Anti-Kais Saied	N/A
Democratic Initiative	N/A	N/A	N/A
National Salvation Meeting	N/A	N/A	N/A
Tunisian Movement for Democracy	N/A	N/A	N/A
Meeting for Tunisia	N/A	N/A	N/A
Youth Meeting for Democracy and Social Justice	N/A	N/A	N/A
Coordination of Parliament Representatives	N/A	N/A	N/A
