= 2019 Tunisian parliamentary election =

- 6 October 2019

All 217 seats in the Assembly of the Representatives of the People 109 seats needed for a majority
- Turnout: 41.70% (▼ ~27 pp)
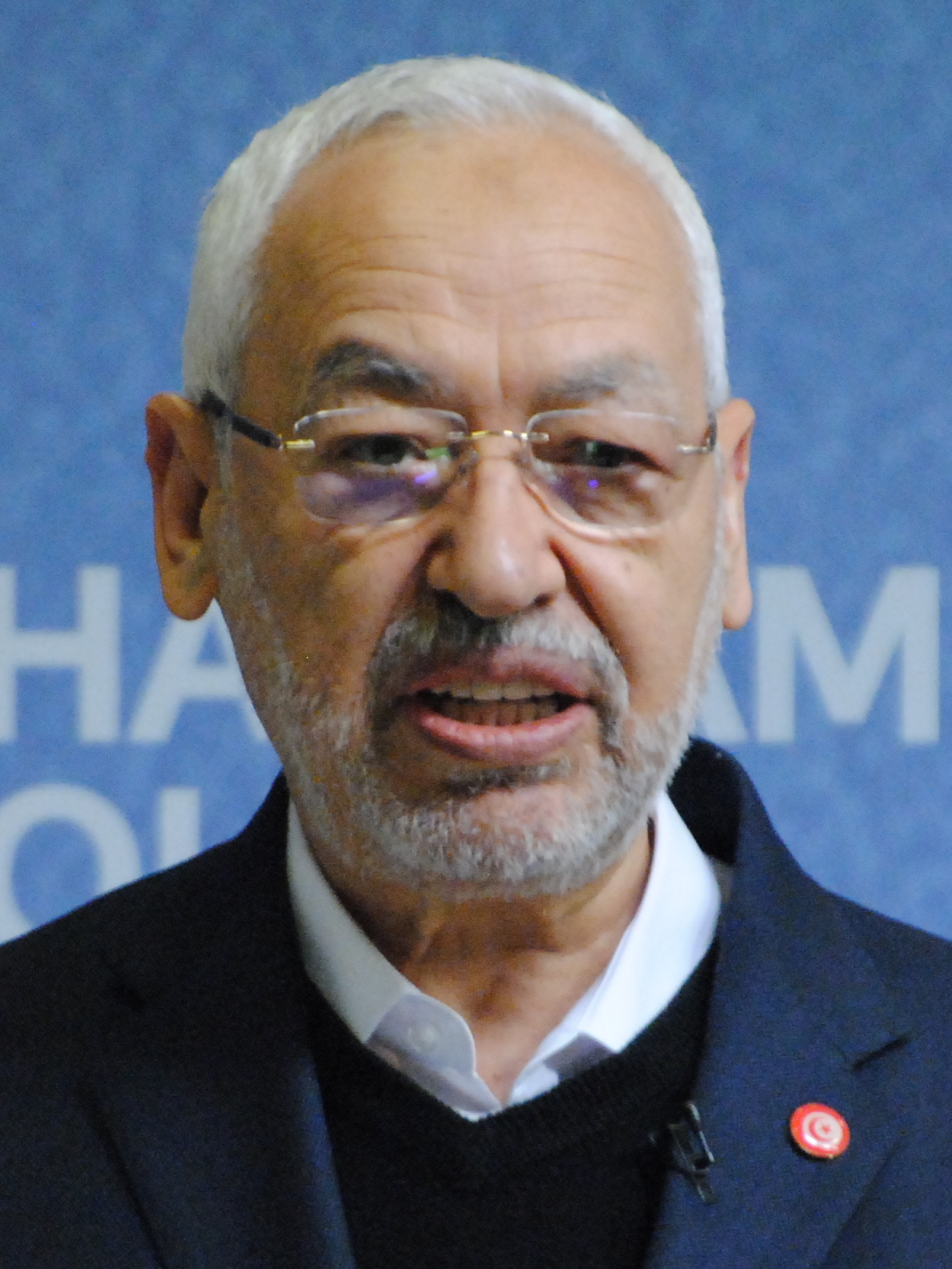

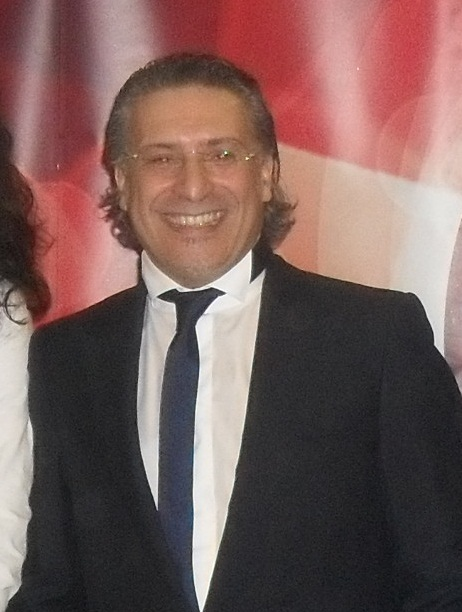

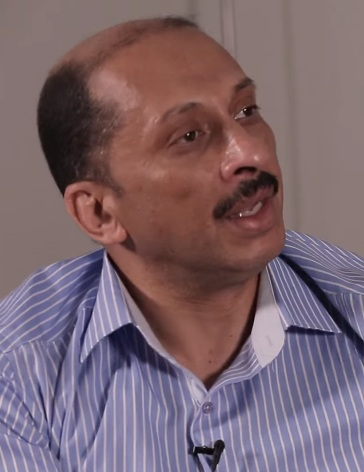

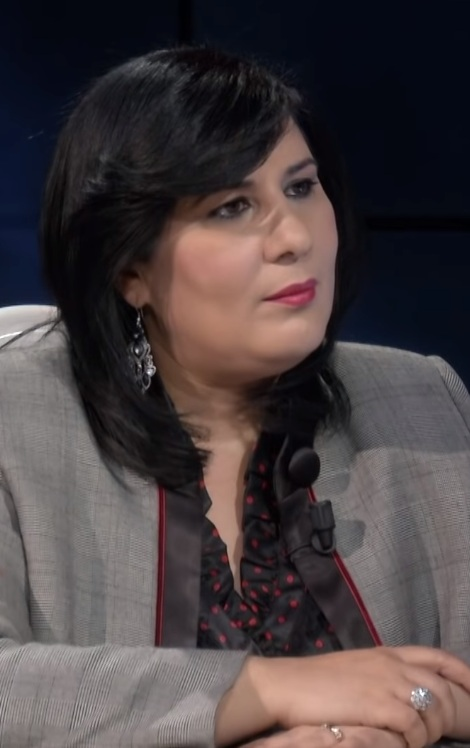
	First party	Second party	Third party
Leader	Rached Ghannouchi	Nabil Karoui	Mohamed Abbou
Party	Ennahda	Heart of Tunisia	Democratic Current
Last election	69 seats, 27.79%	New party	3 seats, 1.95%
Seats won	52	38	22
Seat change	▼17	New party	▲19
Popular vote	561,132	415,913	183,464
Percentage	19.63	14.55	6.42
	Fourth party	Fifth party	Sixth party
	Al Karama		PM
Leader	Seifeddine Makhlouf	Abir Moussi	Zouhair Maghzaoui
Party	Dignity Coalition	Free Destourian Party	People's Movement
Last election	New party	0 seats	3 seats, 1.34%
Seats won	21	17	15
Seat change	New party	▲17	▲12
Popular vote	169,651	189,356	129,604
Percentage	5.94	6.63	4.53
- Map showing the seats won by each party in each constituency.
Prime Minister before election
Youssef Chahed
Tahya Tounes
Prime Minister
Elyes Fakhfakh
Ettakatol

Parliamentary elections took place in Tunisia on 6 October 2019.

== Electoral system ==
The 217 members of the Assembly of the Representatives of the People were elected by closed list proportional representation in 33 multi-member constituencies (27 in Tunisia and 6 representing Tunisian expatriates). Seats were allocated using the largest remainder method. Lists were required to use a zipper system with alternating female and male candidates and have a male and female candidate under the age of 35 in the top four in constituencies with four or more seats.

== Results ==
Party	Votes	%	Seats	+/–
Ennahda Movement	561,132	19.63	52	–17
Heart of Tunisia	415,913	14.55	38	New
Free Destourian Party	189,356	6.63	17	+17
Democratic Current	183,464	6.42	22	+19
Dignity Coalition	169,651	5.94	21	New
People's Movement	129,604	4.53	15	+12
Tahya Tounes	116,582	4.08	14	New
Republican People's Union	59,924	2.10	3	+3
Aïch Tounsi	46,401	1.62	1	New
Tunisian Alternative	46,046	1.61	3	New
Afek Tounes	43,892	1.54	2	–6
Nidaa Tounes	43,213	1.51	3	–83
Machrouu Tounes	40,869	1.43	4	New
Popular Front	32,365	1.13	1	–14
Democratic and Social Union (VDS-PR-MDS)	29,828	1.04	1	New
Errahma	27,944	0.98	4	+4
Current of Love	17,749	0.62	1	–1
Socialist Destourian Party	16,235	0.57	1	New
Farmers' Voice Party	9,366	0.33	1	0
Green League	5,667	0.20	1	+1
Other parties/lists	590,602	20.66	0	–30
Independent lists	82,384	2.88	12	+12
Total	2,858,187	100.00	217	0
Valid votes	2,858,187	97.00		
Invalid/blank votes	88,441	3.00		
Total votes	2,946,628	100.00		
Registered voters/turnout	7,066,940	41.70		
Source: ISIE, ISIE, ISIE

== Aftermath ==
No party or alliance obtained enough seats for a majority. Despite losing seats, Ennahdha became the largest party due to the fracturing of votes between other smaller, newer, or less established parties. Habib Jemli, a former Minister of Agriculture (2011 to 2014), was expected to be put forward as their candidate for Prime Minister. Heart of Tunisia, the Free Destourian Party, and Tahya Tounes announced after the results were released that they would prefer to sit in opposition.

In February 2020, Parliament approved a new coalition government in a confidence vote after months of negotiations. The new coalition included Ennahdha, Tahya Tounes, the People's Movement, Democratic Current and the Tunisian Alternative, as well as several independents.
