= Nabil Karoui =

Tunisian politician and businessman

Nabil Karoui نبيل القروي
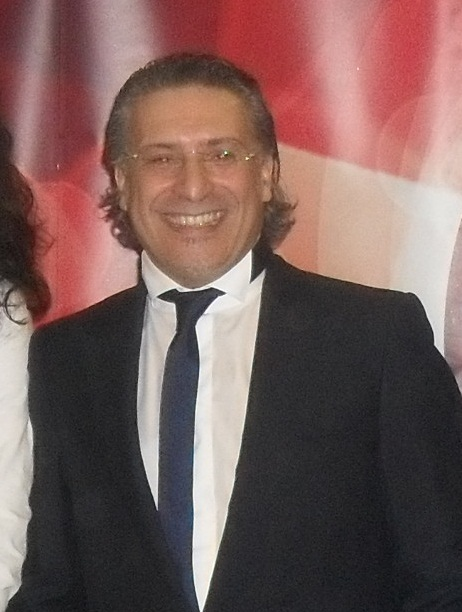
- Nabil Karoui in 2009

Leader of Heart of Tunisia
- Incumbent
- Assumed office 25 June 2019
- Preceded by: Office established

Personal details
- Born: 1 August 1963 (age 63) Bizerte, Tunisia
- Party: Heart of Tunisia (from 2019)
- Other political affiliations: Nidaa Tounes (2012–2017); Independent (2017–2019)
- Spouse: Salwa Smaoui
- Children: 2
- Education: Aix-Marseille University
- Profession: Politician, businessman

Nabil Karoui (Arabic: نبيل القروي; born 1 August 1963) is a Tunisian politician and businessman. One of the key figures in the Tunisian media landscape, Karoui is CEO of Karoui & Karoui World and owner of the Tunisian television station Nessma. Karoui ran as a candidate in the 2019 Tunisian presidential election, finishing in second place.

== Professional career ==
Karoui began his career in marketing and sales at several multinational corporations. After working sales in Southern France for Colgate-Palmolive, he joined the sales and marketing team at Henkel. While there, he was approached by a recruiter to join the growing North Africa division of Canal+ Group, where he served for two years.

In 1996, with his brother Ghazi, he founded his own communications agency KNRG. This was followed in 2002 with the brothers founding Public relations firm Karoui & Karoui World. The firm quickly grew, with offices across the Middle East and North Africa.

In parallel with his international public relations work, Karoui expanded his domestic business, creating subsidiaries around audiovisual production, digital media, urban advertising and a record label. In 2009, he became head of the company's television company, Nessma.

As a supporter of the Arab Maghreb Union, Karoui wanted to use the television channel to demonstrate the feasibility of a Pan-Maghreb movement by focusing on cultural similarities. This involved a focus on Music of the Maghreb and the broadcast of a local version of Star Academy.

On 25 April 2019, equipment from Nessma studios was seized by the Independent High Authority for Audiovisual Communication, who said that the channel had been broadcasting without a license since 2014 and that the seizure was done "after several attempts to find a solution with the channel". On 23 August, the Independent High Authority for Audiovisual Communication and the Independent High Authority for Elections forbade Nessma from covering the 2019 Tunisian presidential election.

== Political career ==
On 30 December 2010, during the beginning of the Tunisian Revolution, the government of Zine El Abidine Ben Ali muzzled the media from reporting on the unrest. Karoui used his position at Nessma to begin a political debate on the ongoing protests, providing some viewers with their first information on local media about the protests.

After the revolution, Karoui changed the channel's programming from entertainment to news, becoming one of the country's leading sources for information. During an interview with former politician and protégé of Habib Bourguiba, Beji Caid Essebsi, Essebsi was suggested as a possible Prime Minister of Tunisia, a role Essebsi would take on in February 2011.

On 7 October 2011, the film Persepolis was shown on the Tunisian private television station Nessma. A day later, a demonstration formed and marched on the station. The main Islamic party in Tunisia, Ennahda, condemned the showing of the film. Nabil Karoui, the owner of Nessma TV, faced trial in Tunis on charges of "violating sacred values" and "disturbing the public order." He was found guilty and ordered to pay a fine of 2,400 dinars ($1,700; £1,000), a much more lenient punishment than predicted. Amnesty International said that criminal proceedings against Karoui were an affront to freedom of expression.

=== Nidaa Tounes ===
After the victory of the Islamist Ennahda Movement in the 2011 Tunisian Constituent Assembly election, Karoui worked with Beji Caid Essebsi and a small group of political personalities to develop a political counter-movement to Ennahda. The party, later named Nidaa Tounes, held some of its first meetings in Karoui's office, and Nessma was used to mobilize activists and voters for the party.

Karoui has been praised by some for organizing a meeting in Paris between Rached Ghannouchi and Beji Caid Essebsi, surprising observers and lowering tension between Islamist and secularist supporters in the country. Karoui would later accompany Essebsi on a trip to Algeria, though some pundits criticized him for his ambition, impatience and intrigue.

In less than two years, Nidaa Tounes became one of the largest political parties in the country, winning the 2014 Tunisian parliamentary election. Karoui's communications firm Karoui & Karoui was instrumental in running the election campaign for Nidaa Tounes. During the 2014 Tunisian presidential election, the firm was the visual services provider for Beji Caid Essebsi's campaign.

While under investigation by the Independent High Authority for Audiovisual Communication in 2015 for his role in the Nidaa Tounes campaign, he worked with Hafedh Caid Essebsi, the son of the president, in Essebsi's campaign for leadership of Nidaa Tounes. After helping remove Mohsen Marzouk from the internal leadership of the party, Karoui became a member of the party's executive board and left his position at Nessma.

Disagreements with Hafedh Caid Essebsi led to Karoui leaving the party in April 2017.

=== Presidential campaign and Heart of Tunisia ===
In 2017, Karoui started charitably distributing staple goods in poorer areas of the country, earning him the nickname "Nabil Macaroni."

In June 2019, Karoui announced his candidacy for the 2019 Tunisian presidential election, quickly pulling ahead of his opponents in opinion polling. On 18 June 2019, the parliament passed amendments to the country's electoral law, accused by some of blocking candidates like Karoui from being eligible to run in the election. The amendments prohibited those with a criminal record, as well as those who ran charitable organizations or received foreign funding for political advertising in the year preceding an election, from standing for election. On 25 June, members of Nidaa Tounes and Popular Front filed a motion in Parliament calling the move unconstitutional. That same day, Karoui founded a new party called "Heart of Tunisia" (Au cœur de la Tunisie/Qalb Tounes).

In July 2019, Heart of Tunisia presented its candidates for the 2019 Tunisian parliamentary election in 33 electoral districts. The party's electoral list included eight women and twenty-five men, including former Nidaa Tounes officials like Ridha Charfeddine. He is supported in his campaign by Lotfi Bel Hadj. Despite Karoui's previous arrest, his candidacy was allowed to remain in place, as he was still being investigated by the courts. His party won the second-most seats behind Ennahdha.

He moved on to face Kaïs Saïed in the second round of the presidential election, held in mid-October, and came in second place in the second round.

== Controversy ==
Opponents have been critical of Karoui's consolidation of the Tunisian media landscape and the intentions of his charitable activities, often referring to him as the "Tunisian Berlusconi".

In 2016, the NGO I-Watch accused Karoui of money laundering and embezzlement through a foreign shell company. A 2017 recording leaked of Karoui attacking the organization, calling them "traitors", "foreign agents" and calling on his staff to file false reports against them.

Additionally, Karoui's links to the Algerian military and Libyan Islamist Abdelhakim Belhaj have been called into question.

On 8 July 2019, Karoui and his brother Ghazi were charged with money laundering around the 2016 allegations. Their assets were frozen and both were forbidden from leaving the country. He was arrested on 23 August following a warrant by the Tunis Court of Appeal. A communiqué from Nidaa Tounes referred to the arrest as "Fascist practices".

However, Ari Ben-Menashe's company, Dickens & Madson, alleged that it had lobbied a meeting for Karoui with US President Donald Trump and Russian President Vladimir Putin on 15 September, ahead of the first round of presidential polls. Later on, Karoui's lawyer confirmed that there is no connection between Karoui and that company.

On 9 October, he was released from prison, prior to the second round of presidential election.

On 24 December 2020, a Tunisian judge ordered the detention of Karoui on suspicion of financial corruption. The Tunis Afrique Presse state news agency said Karoui was to face charges of tax evasion and money laundering. He was later released from prison in June 2021.

On 29 August 2021, Algerian authorities arrested Nabil Karoui along with his brother Ghazi in Tébessa, near the Algeria–Tunisia border, after he had illegally entered the country.

== Personal life ==
Karoui has four children, three sons and one daughter. His son Khalil was killed on 21 August 2016 in a drunk driving crash near Gammarth at the age of 19. The Karoui family established the charity "Khalil Tounes" in memory of his son.
