= 2018 Tunisian local elections =

- 6 May 2018

7,212 council seats in 350 electoral constituencies.
- Turnout: 1,806,969 (35.65)%
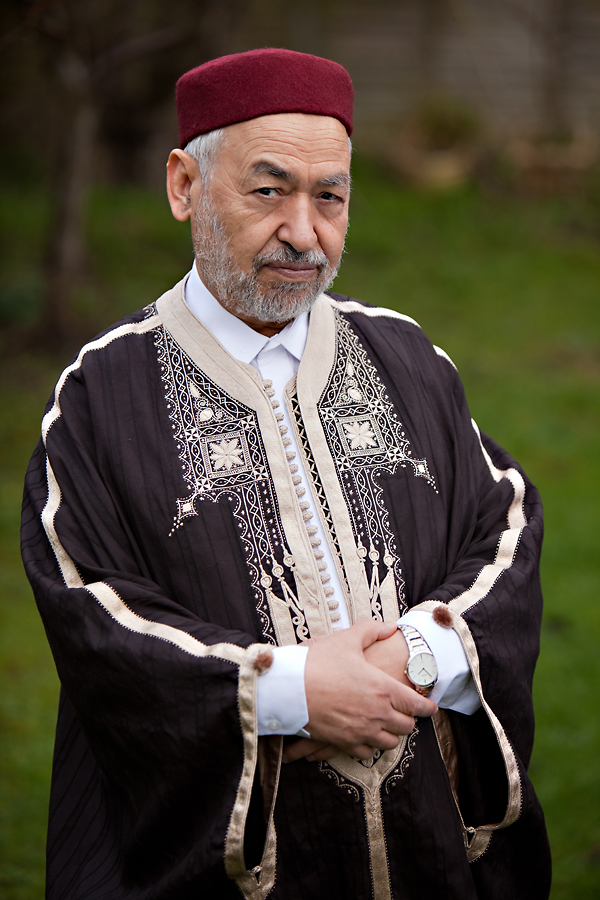

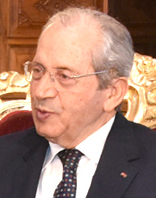

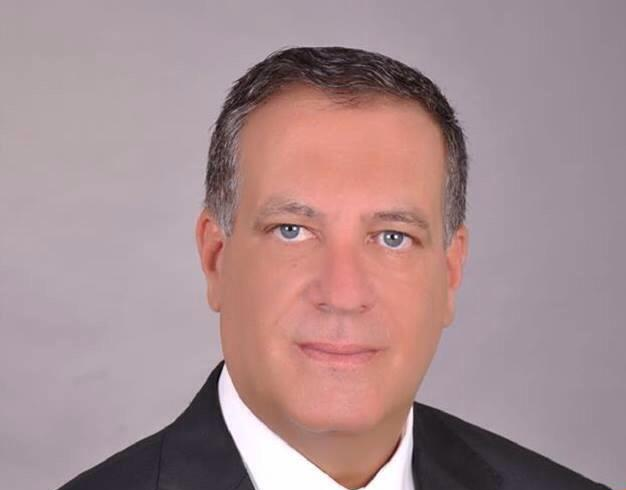

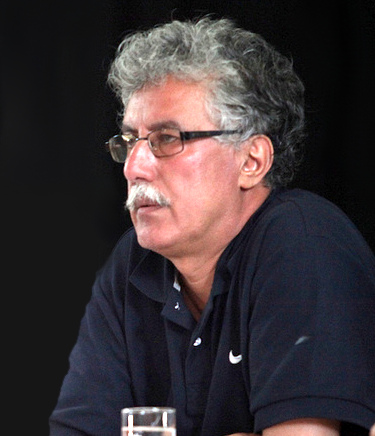
	First party	Second party	Third party
Leader		Rached Ghannouchi	Mohamed Ennaceur
Party	Independent	Ennahdha	Nidaa Tounes
Popular vote	581,930	517,234	377,121
Percentage	32.2%	28,64 %	20.85%
Councillors		2,135 / 7,212	1,600 / 7,212
Councils		131 / 350	76 / 350
	Fourth party	Fifth party
Leader	Ghazi Chaouachi	Hamma Hammami
Party	Democratic Current	Popular Front
Popular vote	75,619	71,551
Percentage	4.19%	3.85%
Councillors	205 / 7,212	261 / 7,212
Councils	3 / 350	8 / 350

Local elections were held in Tunisia on 6 May 2018 under the supervision of the Independent High Authority for Elections. These were Tunisia's first free and democratic local elections following the Tunisian Revolution and saw unaffiliated independent lists win the most votes but on a very low turnout especially in terms of youth turnout which was down sharply.
