= UPL =

UPL may refer to:

- UPL (company), a multinational agribusiness company formerly United Phosphorus Limited
- Unauthorized practice of law, an act sometimes prohibited by statute, regulation, or court rules
- Ukrainian Premier League, highest division of Ukrainian football
- Uganda Premier League, highest division of Ugandan football
- University Press Limited, publishing company based in Dhaka, Bangladesh
- Free Patriotic Union, Tunisian political party
- Leonese People's Union, regional political party in Castile and León, Spain
- Ukko-Pekka Luukkonen, Finnish ice hockey goaltender
- Universal Playland, a Japanese video game developer
