= Nessma El Jadida =

Tunisian commercial television channel

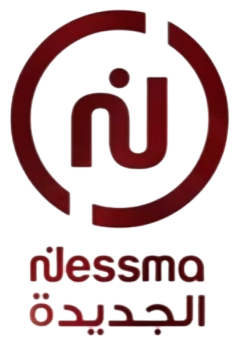
- Logo of the channel from 2022 to the present
- Country: Tunisia; Algeria; Libya; Mauritania; Morocco
- Broadcast area: North Africa; Middle East; Europe; Americas; Asia
- Headquarters: Khalil Karoui Studio, Radès, Ben Arous, Tunisia

Programming
- Languages: Arabic; French
- Picture format: 576i SDTV

Ownership
- Owner: Current: Maghreb Broadcast (75%); Mediaset (25%); Former: Karoui & Karoui Interactive (50%); Mediaset (25%); Quinta Communications (25%)

History
- Launched: March 16, 2007; 19 years ago (original); March 11, 2022; 4 years ago (relaunch)
- Replaced: Nessma Red (2013–2016); Nessma Green (2013–2013); Nessma Blue (2013–2016)

Links
- Website: www.nessma.tv

Nessma El Jadida (Arabic: الجديدة نسمة, translation: New Breeze), formerly known as Nessma TV (Arabic: قناة نسمة, translation: "Breeze TV") and Nessma Rouge (Arabic: نسمة روج, translation: Red Breeze) was a commercial TV channel based in Tunisia, targeting Tunisia and the Maghreb countries. It was 25% formerly owned by the Italian company Mediaset, controlled by Silvio Berlusconi.

All programmes broadcast on this channel had subtitles in French or Maghrebi Arabic. It broadcast such programs as the Maghrebi version of Who Wants to Be a Millionaire?, called Man sa yarbah al malyoon.

== History ==
The TV channel was launched on 16 March 2007, by Nabil and Ghazi Karoui, in partnership with Berlusconi and Tarak Ben Ammar. It was created as a subsidiary of Karoui & Karoui World Group.

In January 2017, Nessma Live was launched. On October 4, Nessma Sport, a streaming channel dedicated to sports, was launched on the Internet.

On 27 October 2021, the channel was ordered to shut down by Tunisia's broadcasting regulator, which said it was operating without a license. The channel's studios were also raided by Tunisian state security forces, and may have been politically motivated, as Nessma owner Nabil Karoui (the runner-up in the 2019 Tunisian presidential election) who has since been recently and frequently jailed is a rival of President Kais Saied. The seizure was also sudden as the network had been unlicensed for years, but no action had previously been taken.

The channel was granted a temporary license by HAICA to reoperate on 8 March 2022 after a negotiation between the representatives of the channel and the president of HAICA on 15 February 2022.

The channel was officially relaunched on 11 March 2022. The channel is now owned by the new managing director Zied Riba under his company Maghreb Broadcast. The channel's name was also changed to Nessma El Jadida or New Nessma (Arabic: الجديدة نسمة, translation: "New Breeze"). The channel became available on the Iraqi satellite ShababSat on DMN.

== Programming ==
=== Shows ===
- Bissiyassa
- Braquage
- Couzinetna Hakka
- Dhayf Al Ousboua
- Envoyé spécial Maghreb
- Imine Issar
- Jek El Mersoul
- Les guignols du Maghreb
- Memnoua Al Rjel
- Moustawdaa Nessma
- Ness El CAN
- Ness El Hand
- Ness Hollywood
- Ness Nessma
- Ness Sport
- NetMag
- Non Solo Moda
- PlayR
- Star Academy Maghreb

=== Soap operas ===
- Aşk-ı Memnu
- Bab al-Hara
- Cello
- Kurtlar Vadisi
- Muhteşem Yüzyıl
- Nsibti Laaziza

== Controversy ==
=== Persepolis ===
On October 7 2011, Nessma broadcast Persepolis, which caused public outrage after a scene depicting God is shown talking to a young girl, which is considered to be forbidden in Islam.

Nabil Karoui's home in Tunis was then damaged with Molotov cocktails on October 14, despite having apologized 2 days prior.

The legal battle started on November 16, 2011 but then delayed until January 23, 2012 due to erupted chaos. 140 lawyers blamed Karoui for "violating sacred values" and "disturbing the public order". Outside court, multiple Islamists assaulted independent journalists by kicking them, insulting them or even spitting in their faces. On May 3 2012, Nessma was later found guilty, Karoui was ordered to pay a fine of 2,400 Tunisian Dinars (~US$1,500).

== Brand identity ==
2007–2013

2014–2016

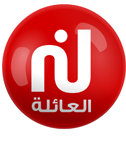
2017–2022

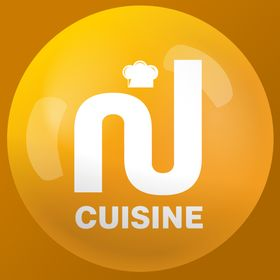
Nessma Cuisine (Nessma Kitchen)
