= Yassine Brahim =

Tunisian politician

- ياسين إبراهيم
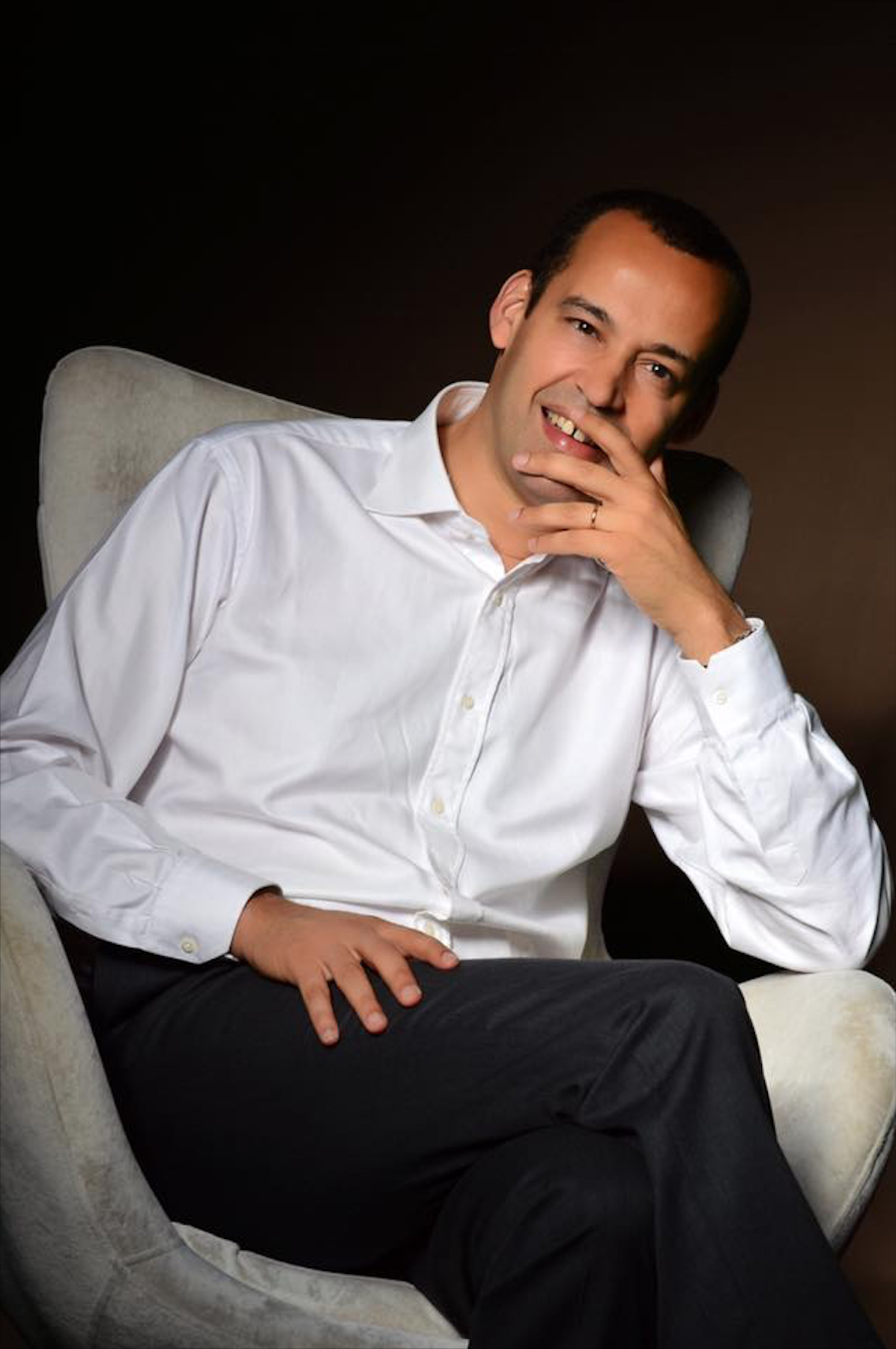

Minister of Development, Investment and International Cooperation
- In office 6 February 2015 – 27 August 2016
- Prime Minister: Habib Essid
- Preceded by: Noureddine Zekri
- Succeeded by: Fadhel Abdelkefi

Personal details
- Born: 20 February 1966 (age 60) Mahdia, Tunisia
- Party: Afek Tounes
- Children: three
- Education: École Centrale Paris
- Profession: Engineer, manager
- Website: yassine.brahim.over-blog.com

Yassine Brahim (Arabic: ياسين إبراهيم; born 20 February 1966 in Mahdia, Tunisia) is a Tunisian engineer, manager and politician. Leader of the secular liberal Afek Tounes party, he was appointed Minister of Development, Investment and International Cooperation in February 2015.

== Early life and education ==
Born 1966 in Mahdia, Brahim was raised in Bizerte by Tunisian Air Force officer Mahfoudh Brahim and his mother, a teacher and daughter of revolutionary Abdelaziz Mastouri. When he was ten years old, they moved to Carthage where Brahim visited secondary school. With a stipend of the Tunisian government, he left Tunisia in 1983 for a preparatory course in Toulouse, France. In 1989 he received his diploma in Engineering at École Centrale Paris.

== Professional career ==
Brahim subsequently worked for Capgemini. A job with French bank Société Générale led him back to Tunisia, where in 2000 he founded his own information services company 2ic which in 2004 he sold to French company Teamlog. He joined financial software company Ubitrade and when his company was sold to GL Trade in 2006, he moved to London being appointed general director of the new company, which he led into the following acquisition by U.S. based SunGard.

== Political career ==
In 2010 he turned back to Tunisia, just before the Tunisian Revolution would lead to his appointment as Minister of Transport and Equipment in the short-lived second Ghannouchi cabinet and the subsequent Essebsi cabinet. He resigned on 17 June 2011 to become general secretary of the newly founded Afek Tounes party which he led into a merger with Ahmed Najib Chebbi's Progressive Democratic Party, the Republican Party Al Joumhouri. On 28 August 2013, Brahim however announced the cession from the Republican Party reestablishing Afek Tounes as an independent liberal party.

In the 2014 legislative election, Afek Tounes won 8 seats and Brahim himself was elected to represent the Mahdia constituency at the Assembly of the Representatives of the People. In February 2015, Afek Tounes agreed in a unity government with Nidaa Tounes and rival UPL. In prime minister Habib Essid's cabinet, he became Minister of Development, Investment and International Cooperation.
