= Amine and Hamza =

Swiss-Tunisian musical duo

Amine and Hamza are two Tunisian musician brothers, playing respectively the oud and the qanun, the two major instruments of the classical Arabic music.

== Biography ==
Since a very young age, the M'raihi brothers were raised with classical Arab music which allowed them to develop an extensive mastery of their instruments. They have since then evolved into diverse musical traditions including classical western music, jazz, flamenco, Indian, Persian music and many others. Their father Lotfi Mraïhi is a politician who is leader of the Republican People's Union. He was a candidate in the 2019 presidential election. In July 2024, Lotfi Mraïhi, founder of the People's Republican Union (UPP) party, was arrested on suspicion of money laundering.

== Performances ==
Amine and Hamza are leaders of a new voice into the Arabic music scenery; anchored in the classical Arabic tradition but opened on the diverse musical styles. They are the image of a new generation, proud of their multiple identities but open and tolerant towards other cultures.

Amine and Hamza have performed in many prestigious scenes all over the world, including the Arab World Institute in Paris, the BBC, the Medina Theatre in Beirut and the Cairo Opera house. They have recorded and published six albums featuring musicians from all over the world and from different musical traditions.

The duo released Fertile Paradoxes in 2017. The band included Baiju Bhatt as violinist and Valentin Conus as saxophonist.

== Discography ==
- 2003: Ala Mar Azaman
- 2004: Ila Hounak
- 2005: Asfar
- 2006: Ilayha wa Ilayh
- 2007: Mani Nassi
- 2009: Tunifunk
- 2010: Perpetual Motion
- 2017: « Fertile Paradoxes »
