= Republican People's Union =

Political party in Tunisia

The Republican People's Union (French: Union populaire républicaine; Arabic: الاتحاد الشعبي الجمهوري) is a neo-Bourguibist political party in Tunisia.

== History ==
The party was founded by Lotfi Mraïhi after the Tunisian Revolution.

They won three seats in the Assembly of the Representatives of the People in the 2019 parliamentary election.

In July 2024, Lotfi Mraïhi was arrested on suspicion of money laundering.

== See also ==
- List of political parties in Tunisia
