= Abid Briki =

Tunisian politician

Abid Briki (born 20 June 1957; Arabic: عبيد البريكي) is a Tunisian trade unionist and politician. He served as Minister of Civil Service, Governance and the Fight against Corruption in the Chahed Cabinet.

== Early life ==
Briki was born in Zarzis.

== Political career ==
Briki founded the Tunisia Forward party in 2018. He was a candidate in the 2019 presidential election and came in 17th place. Briki announced he would not stand as a candidate in the 2022 parliamentary election.
