= Errahma =

Tunisian political party

Errahma حزب الرحمة
- Leader: Saïd Jaziri
- Founded: August 2012
- Ideology: Islamism; Islamic democracy Religious conservatism
- Religion: Salafism
- Tunisian Parliament: 0 / 161

Website
- http://errahmah.com

Errahma (Arabic: حزب الرحمة, lit. 'Party of Divine Mercy') is a Salafi Islamist political party in Tunisia. The party, founded in 2012, is led by Saïd Jaziri, former spokesperson for the Tunisian community in Canada.

The party supports the parliamentary system and the inclusion of Islamic law in the Constitution.

The party ran in the 2014 and 2019 parliamentary elections; in the latter election, they won four seats.

== Election results ==
Election results by year
Election year	No. of overall votes	% of overall total	No. of candidates run	No. of seats won	+/−	Government
2019	27,944	0.98	4	4 / 217	+4	Opposition

== Elected representatives ==
In the 2019 elections, the party gained four seats in the Assembly of People's Representatives.

- Salwa Ben Aycha, elected in Tunis' first district
- Ahmed Ben Ayed, elected for Ariana district (until January 21, 2020)
- Saïd Jaziri, elected in Ben Arous district
- Mouadh Ben Dhiaf, elected in Manouba district (until January 21, 2020).

On January 21, 2020, MPs Mouadh Ben Dhiaf and Ahmed Ben Ayed resigned from the party, accusing leader Said Jaziri of authoritarianism.
