= Tunisnews =

Tunisnews is an archive of news events, dispatches, articles, features, and documents related to Tunisia's political, economic, social, and cultural events.

Tunisnews gained a reputation during the years (May 2000 to january 2012) for been a free and Independent news agency. Reporting daily on events happening in Tunisia concerning Tunisians (living inside and outside the country), North Africans, Arabs and Muslims in general.

It is a collection of a daily newsletters sent to subscribers and browsed online on the official website Tunisnews.net.

It includes information about the Tunisian opposition parties, NGOs, organisations in Tunisia, list of events, documents, and daily discussions amongst the readers, thinkers and some of the opposition activists.

Since May 2000 to January 14, 2011, Tunisnews.net was blocked by authorities inside Tunisia.

== See also ==
- Media of Tunisia
