= Tunisia Forward =

Political party in Tunisia

Tunisia Forward (French: Tunisie en avant; Arabic: تونس إلى الأمام ) is a political party in Tunisia.

== History ==
The party is left-wing and was founded 7 May 2018 by Abid Briki.

The party participated in the 2022 parliamentary election and won one seat - despite reservations on certain articles of the electoral law which could have repercussions on the results, according to the movement. They also call for the formation of an electoral front bringing together all the progressive forces that support the July 25 process. Party secretary general Abid Briki would not stand as a candidate.

In April 2026, the party joined the Sovintern, a socialist political international led by Sergey Mironov.

== See also ==
- List of political parties in Tunisia
