= Slim Riahi =

- سليم الرياحي
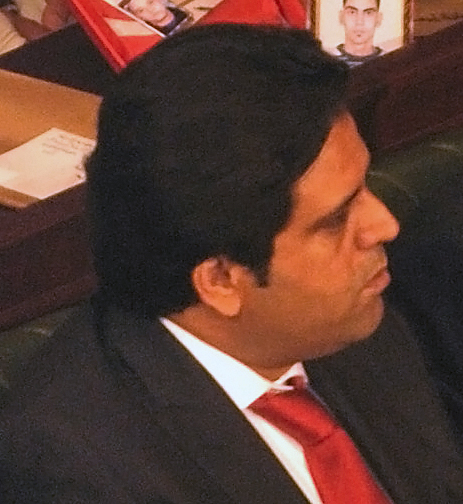

Personal details
- Born: 13 July 1972 (age 54) Bizerte, Tunisia
- Party: Call of Tunisia (2018-2019); Free Patriotic Union (2011-2018, 2019-)
- Education: University of Tripoli

Slim Riahi (Arabic: سليم الرياحي; born 1972) is a Tunisian businessman and politician. He was the founder and leader of the Free Patriotic Union (UPL).

== Biography ==
Slim Riahi was born on 13 July 1972 in Bizerte, Tunisia. In 1980, his family went into exile in Libya, as his father was an Arab nationalist opposed to President Habib Bourguiba, as well as to his successor Zine El Abidine Ben Ali. Slim Riahi grew up in Libya. He studied management at the Al Fateh University in Tripoli. Then, he engaged in the oil production, energy, aviation and property development industries, which acquired him great wealth. Later, he moved to London, and holds dual British and Tunisian citizenship.

Returning to Tunisia after the Tunisian revolution in January 2011, he founded a political party, the Free Patriotic Union (UPL), which promotes an economically liberal and modernist program and positions itself at the centre of the political spectrum. The party run into controversy for mingling political and business interests, extensive campaigning and unclear financial resources. In August 2011, Riahi announced that he was planning to enter into Tunisia's media business with acquiring a 20-percent stake of the newspaper publisher Dar Assabah. He also established three TV stations, namely Ettounsiya Al-Oula, Ettounsiya Sport and Ettounsiya News.

He advertised to become the president of Club Africain on 6 June 2012 and his love for Club Africain made him the president of the club. He was officially confirmed as the new president of Club Africain on 16 June 2012.

On 28 June 2017, his assets were frozen by the Tunis Court of First Instance on suspicion of money laundering. Riahi is in self-imposed exile in the United Arab Emirates following the issuing of a five year jail sentence against him for issuing checks without balance, as well as corruption related to his leading the Tunisian sports club Club Africain., On 16 October 2017 the Tunisian court decided to drop the verdicts against businessman Salim Riahi in the case of checks without balance. Al Riahi attended accompanied by a statement stating that he had cleared the checks, after objecting to a 5-year prison sentence.
