= Abir Moussi =

Tunisian lawyer and politician (born 1975)

Abir Moussi MP
- عبير موسي
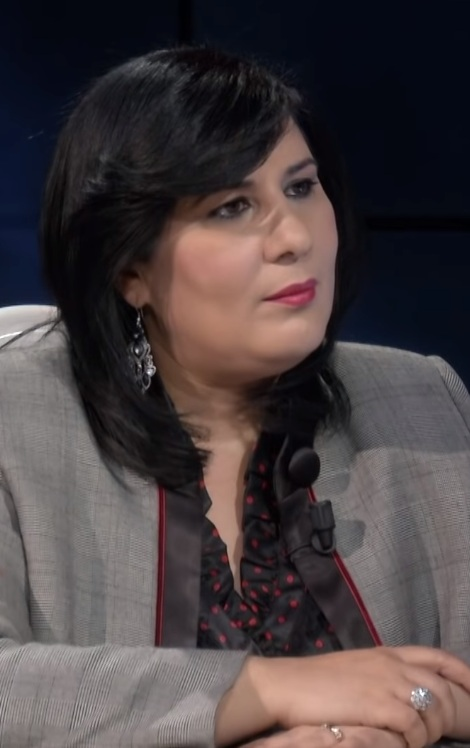
- Moussi in 2019

Member of the Assembly of the Representatives of the People for Tunis 2
- Incumbent
- Assumed office 13 November 2019

President of Free Destourian Party
- Incumbent
- Assumed office 13 August 2016

Personal details
- Born: 15 March 1975 (age 51) Jemmal, Tunisia
- Party: Free Destourian Party (2013–present)
- Other political affiliations: Democratic Constitutional Rally (2000–2011); Independent (2011–2013)
- Children: 2
- Education: Tunis University
- Occupation: Lawyer
- Profession: Politician

Abir Moussi (Arabic: عبير موسي; born 15 March 1975) is a Tunisian lawyer and politician. She has been the president of the Free Destourian Party since 2016 and a member of Parliament since 2019. Abir Moussi is considered one of the most important and famous Tunisian politicians who defend the civil state and Bourguiba's approach. She is also known for her absolute rejection of political Islam movements and all forms of confusion between religion and politics. On 3 October 2023, Abir Moussi was arrested in front of the presidential palace of Carthage, in a series of political arrests and crackdown on the opposition launched by Tunisian president Kais Saied.

== Biography ==
Abir Moussi was born on 15 March 1975, in Jemmal to a father working in the national security service (from Béja) and a mother who was a teacher (from Bab Souika).

=== Professional career ===
Holder of a master's degree in law and a DEA in economic and business law, she became a lawyer at the Bar of the Court of Cassation, the highest court in Tunisia. She is also vice-president of the municipality of Ariana, president of the litigation committee and member of the national forum of lawyers of the Democratic Constitutional Rally (RCD) and secretary general of the Tunisian Association of Victims of Terrorism.

=== Political career ===
On 10 January 2010, she was appointed Assistant Secretary General in charge of Women at RCD. Following the fall of President Zine El Abidine Ben Ali's regime and the dissolution of the RCD in 2011, which she opposed as a lawyer, Moussi joined the Destourian Movement, founded by former Prime Minister Hamed Karoui. On 13 August 2016, Moussi was appointed President of the Destourian Movement, renamed the Free Destourian Party. Regularly referred to as an extreme right-wing party, the latter brings together sympathisers of the former Democratic Constitutional Rally which dominated the country before the revolution. She therefore does not recognize the 2014 Constitution and advocates for the establishment of a presidential system.

Moussi has declared herself opposed to the decriminalization of homosexuality. On 16 August 2018, the NGO Association of Help, Homosexual Defense for the Equality of Sexual Orientations (ADHEOS) called for Moussi to be banned from the Schengen Area following homophobic and hate speech, in which she called for the systematic imprisonment of homosexuals, whom she associated with criminals. The NGO also called on the authorities to take measures to protect the rights of homosexuals in the Schengen area. In March 2019, Moussi declared in an interview with the Pan-African Jeune Afrique magazine "I will not legislate on people's privacy. I will ban anal testing, except for rape and felony".

Although she is in favor of equality between men and women in matters of inheritance, Moussi is opposed to the current government's plan to implement it, arguing that by extending rights to children born out of wedlock, it represents an attack on the institution of the family. The proposal of the Individual Freedoms and Equality Committee (COLIBE) to introduce this equality while leaving the legatees the choice of using the old system based on the Quran also attracts criticism from the candidate, who sees it as "the door open to customary marriages and discrimination between women themselves".

In June 2020, Moussi sharply criticized speaker of the parliament Rached Ghannouchi and his political party the Ennahda Movement for his ties to the Muslim Brotherhood and for spreading Islamist ideology in Tunisia. Moussi claimed that Ghannouchi were trying to divide Tunisians based on religious views and re-write Tunisian history.

=== Persecution ===
On 3 October 2023, Moussi was detained after being arrested at the entrance to the Carthage Palace. On 22 November 2024, she was sentenced on appeal to one year and four months. On 12 June 2025, she was sentenced to two years' imprisonment for criticising the legislative electoral process. In December 2025, she was sentenced to 12 years' imprisonment on charges of assault intended to cause chaos.

==== Reactions ====
===== Domestic =====
The day after her arrest, several Tunisian civil society organizations and political parties condemned the detention of Abir Moussi. The Tunisian Human Rights League criticized the arrest and called for her immediate release, noting what it described as multiple legal violations. The Tunisian Association of Democratic Women stated in a communiqué that the arrest would further worsen the political situation and contribute to the deterioration of public life, also demanding her prompt release. The Tunisian Order of Lawyers commissioned three of the country’s most prominent attorneys to represent her during the trial. In November 2025, the Tunis section of the Order called on lawyers to mobilize and attend her hearing in order to show support and help safeguard her rights. In January 2024, the country’s main labour organization, the Tunisian General Labour Union (UGTT), announced that it would withdraw a previous complaint it had filed against Moussi. The UGTT stated that it did not want the complaint to be used against her in a way that could further complicate her situation.

On 15 October 2025, the Free Destourian Party organized a demonstration in Tunis in which thousands of supporters protested the arrest of Abir Moussi and called for her release. Additional protests followed, including a demonstration on 3 December 2023 in front of the representative of the Office of the United Nations High Commissioner for Human Rights in Tunisia, human chain was organized on 7 December 2023 around Manouba Prison, where Moussi was being held. Another demonstration was organized in January 2024 in the capital. Several of the party’s planned protests have reportedly been banned.

===== International =====
Her detention has been widely described as politically motivated. In February 2025, the United Nations Working Group on Arbitrary Detention issued an opinion declaring Abir Moussi’s detention arbitrary and unlawful, noting that it met four out of the five categories of arbitrary deprivation of liberty. The Working Group found that her detention lacked any legal basis, resulted from the exercise of her fundamental rights, gravely violated her right to a fair trial, and was discriminatory on account of her political or other opinions contrary to the principles of equality before the law and non-discrimination. In the same opinion, the Working Group called for her immediate release.

Amnesty International issued two public letters concerning her case, the first in February 2024 and the second in October 2025. In its 2024 letter, the organization called on the Tunisian authorities to release her, drop the charges, and end what it described as judicial harassment. Amnesty International characterized her detention as arbitrary and stated that she had been imprisoned for the legitimate exercise of her rights to freedom of expression and peaceful assembly. In its 2025 letter, the organization reiterated its call for her release, noting that she had been detained for more than two years and was facing charges carrying the death penalty.

== Electoral history ==
=== Legislative elections ===
In the 2014 legislative election, Abir Moussi was the president of the electoral list of the Free Destourian Party in the constituency of Béja, her list got 1.05% (836 votes) and she failed to enter the parliament.

In the 2019 legislative election she was again candidate, this time she was head of the list of her party in the second constituency, she got 15.8% (26.076 votes) and came in second place just after the Heart of Tunisia list, she got elected deputy.

=== Presidential elections ===
Abir Moussi was the candidate of her party to the 2019 presidential election where she got 4% of the votes (135,461 votes) and came in 9th place and therefore eliminated since the first round. She was the woman who got the most votes in a presidential elections in Tunisia's history. Abir Moussi is a candidate for the 2024 presidential election.

Election year	# of total votes	% of overall vote	# of seats
2014	11,403	0.33%	0 / 217
2019	189,356	6.63%	17 / 217

== Personal life ==
She is married and has two daughters.

== Distinctions ==
- Order of the Republic.
