= Samia Abbou =

Tunisian lawyer and politician

Samia Hamouda Abbou
- سامية عبو
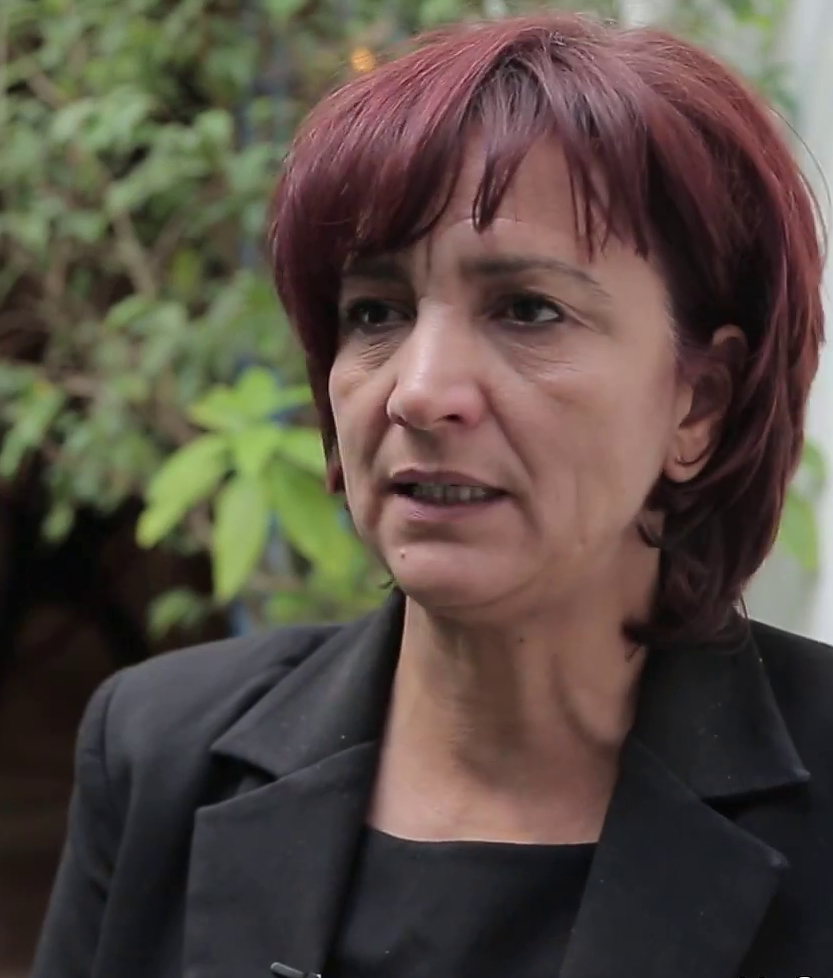

Member of the Constituent Assembly (Elect)
- Constituency: Tunis I

Member of the Assembly of the Representatives of the People
- Incumbent
- Assumed office 27 December 2011
- Preceded by: Moncef Marzouki
- Constituency: Nabeul II

Personal details
- Born: 3 November 1965 (age 60) Tebourba, Tunisia
- Party: Democratic Current (since 2013)
- Other political affiliations: Congress for the Republic (2006–2013)
- Spouse: Mohamed Abbou
- Children: 3
- Education: Tunis El Manar University

Samia Hamouda Abbou (Arabic: سامية حمودة عبو, born 3 November 1965) is a Tunisian lawyer and politician. On 27 December 2011, she replaced Moncef Marzouki in the Constituent Assembly after he assumed office as the interim President of Tunisia.

Before the Tunisian Revolution she was one of the founding members of and joined the Congress for the Republic (CPR) in 2006. She is married to Mohamed Abbou, who until June 2012 served as Deputy Prime Minister for Administrative Reform in the Jebali Cabinet. On 17 February 2013, they both left the CPR and founded the Democratic Current in May.

In the 2014 parliamentary election she was head of her party's list in the Tunis I constituency and succeeded in being reelected to the Assembly of the Representatives of the People.

== Biography ==
She completed her primary and secondary studies in Tebourba, then joined the Faculty of Law and Political Science in Tunis until she graduated in 2010.

She is one of the founding members of the National Council for Freedoms in Tunisia and joined the Congress for the Republic in 2006.

Member of the Constituent Assembly, replacing Moncef Marzouki, from 27 December 2011.

She left the Congress for the Republic in 2013 and joined the Democratic Courts, under whose colors she was elected to the Assembly of People's Representatives in the elections of 26 October 2014 with 5,404 votes.

In 2014, she was decorated with the insignia of Knight of the National Order of Merit of Tunisia.
