= Secularism in Tunisia =

Tunisian experience of secularism

Secularism in Tunisia is an ideological and political movement aiming at defining the relationship between religion and state and the place of religion in society during an ongoing modernization. The Tunisian Constitution of 2022 affirmed Tunisia as a civil state founded on citizenship.The constitution Doesn't contain any state religion but it says that Tunisia is part of The Islamic ummah(nation).The following religious festivals are recognized as national holidays: the Islamic New Year, the birth of the Islamic prophet Muhammad, Eid al-Fitr, and Eid al-Adha.

== History ==
In 1956, Tunisia achieved formal independence from France. From 1956 to 1987, under the presidency of Habib Bourguiba, the first president, Tunisia's post independence government pursued a program of secularization. Bourguiba, "who has been one of the most avowedly secularist political strategists in the Arab world", modified laws regarding religious endowments (habus), secularized education and unified the legal system so that all Tunisians, regardless of religion, were subject to the state courts. He restricted the influence of the religious University of Ez-Zitouna and replaced it with a faculty of theology integrated into the University of Tunis, banned the headscarf for women, made members of the religious hierarchy state employees and ordered that the expenses for the upkeep of mosques and the salaries of preachers to be regulated.

Moreover, his best known legal innovation was the ‘Code du Statut Personel’ (CSP), the laws governing issues related to the family: marriage, guardianship of children, inheritance and most importantly the abolishing of polygamy and making divorce subject to judicial review.

Bourguiba sought to undercut the religious establishment's ability to prevent his secularization program, and although he was careful to locate these changes within the framework of a modernist reading of Islam and presented them as the product of ijtihad (independent interpretation) and not a break with Islam, he became well known for his secularism.

Following increasing economic problems, Islamist movements came about in 1970 with the revival of religious teaching in Ez-Zitouna University and the influence which came from Arab religious leaders from the Syrian and Egyptian Muslim Brotherhoods. There was also influence by Hizb ut-Tahrir, whose members issued a magazine in Tunis named Azeytouna.

Government-induced secularization triggered the formation of the Islamic Tendency Movement; the movement and its leader Rached Ghannouchi turned into a rallying point for government opponents. In the aftermath, the struggle of Bourguiba and then Zine El Abidine Ben Ali, who succeeded him, with political Islamists went out of control, and in order to suppress the opposition the Islamist leaders were harassed, tortured, and exiled.

== Post-Arab Spring developments ==
The Arab Spring changed government in Tunisia and resulted in adoption of the Tunisian Constitution of 2014 following a considerable debate between Islamic and secular political groups and movements. On 1 March 2011, after the secularist dictatorship of Zine El Abidine Ben Ali collapsed in the wake of the 2011 Tunisian revolution, Tunisia's interim government granted the Ennahda, a moderate Islamist movement in Tunisia, permission to form a political party. Since then, the Ennahda Islamic Party has become the biggest and most well-organized party in Tunisia, so far outdistancing its more secular competitors. In the Tunisian Constituent Assembly election, 2011, the first free election in the country's history with a turn out of 51.1% of all eligible voters, the party won 37.04% of the popular vote and 89 (41%) of the 217 assembly seats, far more than any other party. In 2016, Ennahda rebranded itself as the post-Islamist political party of Muslim Democrats drawing a line between religion and politics. The Tunisian President Kais Saied’s July 2021 coup marked the end of a political cycle in post-revolutionary Tunisia, ushering in a period of repression against Ennahda and its leaders.

=== Women’s rights ===
In July 2017, the Tunisian parliament passed the Law on Eliminating Violence Against Women, before there had been no specific law on domestic violence. The new law also includes provisions on harassment in public spaces and economic discrimination. It also abolished “marry-your-rapist law”.

Since September 2017, Tunisian Muslim women are allowed to marry non-Muslim men. The ban had been in place since 1973. Tunisian president Beji Caid Essebsi argued that the ban “violated Tunisia's constitution”, and that he wants to create "total, actual equality between men and women citizens in a progressive way". Under Islamic law, as per Quran, a Muslim woman is not allowed to marry outside the Islamic faith (a non-Muslim).

In addition to the afromentioned, Tunisian parliament is working on changing inheritance rights to make them equal for men and women. In addition to codifying equal inheritance, the Parliament advocates abolishing the death penalty, decriminalizing homosexuality and annulling dowries. Such rapid changes provoked a backlash from Islamists, conservatives and even some moderates who view it as “an unwelcome departure from Islamic values.”

== Civil state ==
A compromising notion of a Civil state that merges concepts of a Secular state and an Islamic state was suggested by Rached Ghannouchi. Interviewed in Turkey in 2011, he said, "We need democracy and development in Tunisia and we strongly believe in the compatibility between Islam and democracy, between Islam and modernity. So we do not need secularism in Tunisia."

== See also ==
- Secularity
- Secular state
- Islam and secularism
- Separation of church and state
