= Safi Saïd =

Tunisian journalist and writer (born 1953)

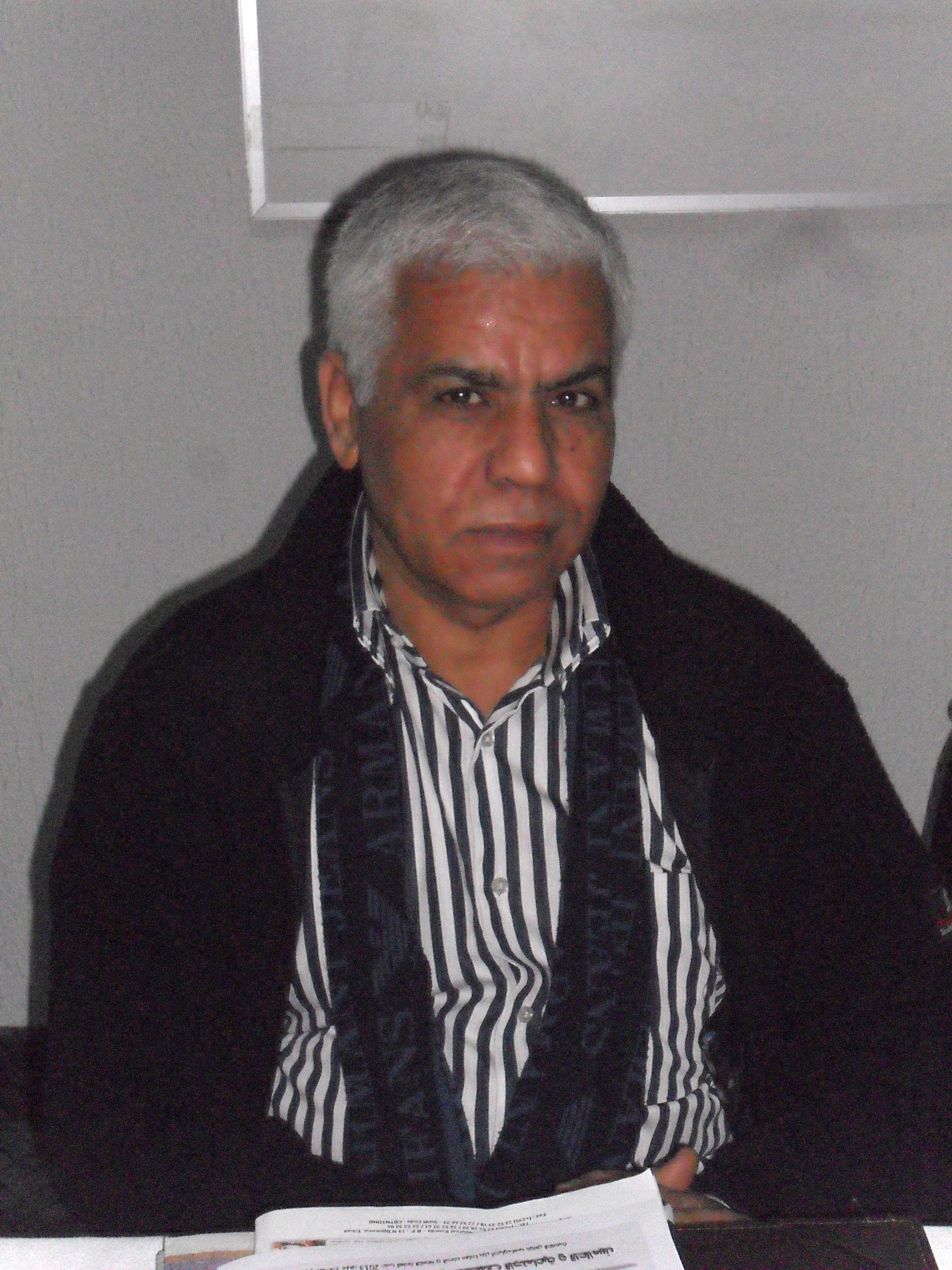
Safi Said

Ahmed Safi Ben Ibrahim Ben Haj Ali Saïd (Arabic: أحمد الصافي بن إبراهيم بن الحاج علي سعيد; born 22 September 1953), better known as simply Safi Saïd, is a Tunisian journalist and writer. He was a candidate in the 2014 Tunisian presidential election and in the 2019 presidential election.

He is considered to be one of the major intellectuals in Tunisia since 2011, especially after the spread of his expression "the Arab Spring" that he coined to refer to the appraisals that took place across several countries in the Arab world back then.

== Personal life ==
In his twenties, Safi Saïd left Tunisia to study history, journalism and political sciences in Algeria. At university, he attended lectures of prominent journalists such as Mohamed Hassanein Heikal, John Fontain, John Daniel and Saad Zahran. Inspired by the left atmosphere that prevailed among the intellectuals at that time, he founded along with a group of Arab and African students the "Voluntaria" movement which allowed him to travel to big cities and across continents.

Saïd visited Angola during the Angolan War of Independence and then he visited Cuba, Vietnam and Iraq. He was arrested in Jordan due to doubts about his left-wing relations and visit to these countries. After his release, he moved to Beirut where he witnessed the Lebanese Civil War starting from the year 1976. He joined the press and published articles in many famous Lebanese newspapers. In the late 1980s he settled in Paris where he established two magazines; Gallery 4 and Africana. He returned to Tunisia, and launched in collaboration with "Jeune Afrique" the Arabic version of the same newspaper.

After the Tunisian Revolution, he launched the newspaper Orabia which was first released as a magazine.

In October 2011, Safi Saïd ran as an independent for Constituent Assembly of Tunisia election, representing the city Gafsa. On the occasion of the 2019 Tunisian parliamentary election, he was elected independent deputy from the second district of Tunis.

== Career ==
As a contributor :

"Al Hadaf" magazine, "Assafir" magazine, "Likul Al Arab" magazine, "Acharq Al Awsat" newspaper, "Al Majala" magazine.

As an Editor in Chief :

"Riwaq 4", Africana, Jeune Afrique in Arabic, Geoarabia, Arabia.

== Main publications ==
- (in Arabic) Biography of Ben Bella (بن بلة يتكلم : المذكرات السياسية و الثقافية، لأحمد بن بلا), ed. Sin Sad, Beirut, 1981
- (in Arabic) The satanic triangle (مثلث الشياطيني الاستيوائي), ed. Sin Sad, Beirut, 1986
- (in Arabic) The years of the labyrinth: on the altar of the 21st century (سنوات المتاهة : على مذبح القرن 21), ed. Sin Sad, Beirut, 1994
- (in Arabic) Fever 42 (الحمى 42: لا أنبياء و لا شياطين), ed. Bissan Publishers, 1996
- (in Arabic) Casino (كازينو), ed. Dar El Moultaka, Beirut, 1997
- (in Arabic) The cursed thresholds in the Middle East (العتبات المدنسة في الشرق الأوسط), ed. Bissan Publishers, Beirut, 1999
- (in Arabic) Bourguiba, a semi-prohibited biography (بورقيبة، سيرة شبه محرمة), ed. Riad El Rayyes Books, Beirut, 2000
- (in Arabic) The divine gardens (حدائق الله), ed. Soutimidia, Tunis, 2001
- (in Arabic) Arab's autumn (خريف العرب : البئر و الصومعة و الجنرال), ed. Bissan Publishers, Beirut, 2005
- (in Arabic) The return of imperial time and the end of the fatherland (عودة الزمن الإمبراطوري و نهاية الأوطان), ed. Riad El Rayyes Books, Beirut, 2006
- (in Arabic) The prostate years (سنوات البروستاتا), ed. Ourabia, Beirut, 2011
- (in Arabic) Revolution's dialogues (حوارات الثورة), ed. Ourabia, Beirut, 2012
- (in Arabic) Pre-revolutionary deliveries (المضاد الحيوي: مخاضات بين زمنين ما قبل الثورة), ed. Ourabia, Beirut, 2013
- (in Arabic) Royal seduction (الإغواء الملكي), ed. Ourabia, Beirut, 2013
- (in Arabic) Post-revolutionary controversy (جدل ما بعد الثورة), ed. Ourabia, Beirut, 2014
- (in Arabic) The Tunisian equation (المعادلة التونسية), ed. Ourabia, Beirut, 2014
- (in Arabic) Bloodthirsty geopolitics (جيوبوليتيك الدم . التاريخ الاسير و الجغرافيا المتصدعة), ed. Soutimidia, Tunis, 2015
- (in Arabic) Kitsch 2011 (الكيتش 2011), ed. Soutimidia, Tunis, 2016
- (in Arabic) The great call to the last of the Beys (المانفستو : النداء الاخير الي الباي الكبير), ed. Soutimidia, Tunis, 2017
- (in Arabic) Gaddafi, an intact biography (القذافي ،سيرة غير مدنسة), ed. Soutimidia, Tunis, 2018
- (in Arabic) Tunisia. How to create the future ? (المعادلة التـونسـيــة كيــف نصنـع المستقبل؟ رؤية متكاملة), ed. Soutimidia, Tunis, 2019
- (in Arabic) Geopolitics of Nations : The Critical Transition from Imperialism to Meta-imperialism (جيوبوليتيك الأمم : الانتقال الحرج من الامبريالي إلى الميتا-امبريالي), ed. Soutimidia, Tunis, 2021
