= Ghazi Chaouachi =

Tunisian politician

Ghazi Chaouachi غازي الشواشي
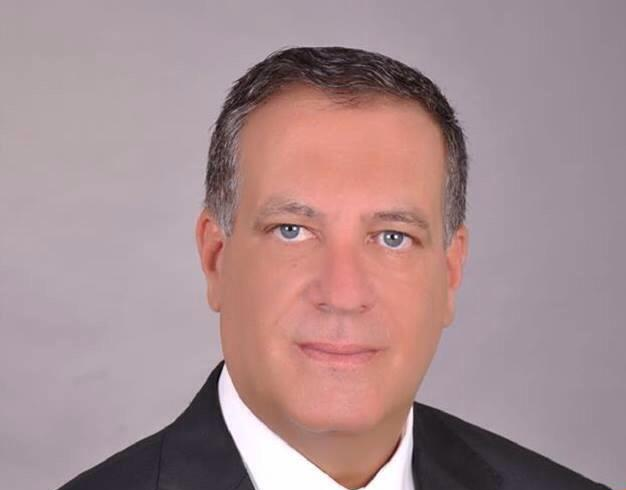

Personal details
- Born: Ghazi Chaouachi; 5 February 1963 (age 63) Le Bardo, Tunisia
- Party: Democratic Current
- Children: 3
- Education: Tunis El Manar University
- Profession: Lawyer

Ghazi Chaouachi (Arabic: غازي الشواشي), born on February 5, 1963, is a Tunisian lawyer and politician.

He was elected to the Assembly of the Representatives of the People in 2004 and he is the co-founder and current Secretary General of the Democratic Current.

In 2020, he became Minister of State Property and Land Affairs and then interim Minister of Equipment, Housing and Spatial Planning.
