= Heart of Tunisia =

Tunisian political party

Heart of Tunisia قلب تونس Au cœur de la Tunisie Ul en Tunest (Berber)
- Leader: Nabil Karoui
- Founded: 20 June 2019
- Split from: Free Patriotic Union
- Ideology: Bourguibism; Populism; Secularism
- Political position: Centre
- Assembly of the Representatives of the People: 0 / 161

Website
- 9albtounes.com (Link dead) Wayback Machine (2019)

Heart of Tunisia (Arabic: قلب تونس, Berber: Ul en Tunest, French: Au cœur de la Tunisie) is a Tunisian political party founded on 20 June 2019 by lawyer Houda Knani, a former member of the Free Patriotic Union. The party's candidate for the 2019 Tunisian presidential election, party head Nabil Karoui, placed second, earning him a spot in the runoff election.

On 10 March 2020, 11 members of the party in the parliament announced their resignation from the party and the party's parliamentary bloc. The resignations of almost one third of the party's parliamentarians reduced the number of the party's seats in the parliament from 38 to 27.
