= Al Amal (political party) =

Tunisian political party

Hope Party الأمل
- Leader: Ahmed Néjib Chebbi
- Founded: 29 January 2012 (as political coalition); December 2018 (as political party)
- Ideology: Bourguibism
- Assembly of the Representatives of the People: 0 / 161

Website
- amal.com.tn

The Hope Party (Arabic: الأمل, romanized: Al Amal) is a Tunisian political party that fielded Selma Elloumi Rekik as its candidate in the 2019 Tunisian presidential election.
