= Free Patriotic Union =

Tunisian political party

Free Patriotic Union الاتحاد الوطني الحرّ
- French name: Union patriotique libre
- Chairperson: Slim Riahi
- Founded: 19 May 2011; 20 June 2019 (refoundation)
- Dissolved: 14 October 2018
- Merged into: Call of Tunisia (split from the party in 2019)
- Headquarters: Immeuble Forum du Lac; Les Berges du Lac; 1053 Tunis
- Newspaper: Tounès El Horra
- Ideology: Economic liberalism Secularism
- Political position: Centre-right
- Colours: Red
- Assembly of the Representatives of the People: 0 / 161

The Free Patriotic Union (Arabic: الاتحاد الوطني الحرّ, romanized: el-Itiḥād el-Waṭanī el-Ḥurr; French: Union patriotique libre), known by its French acronym UPL, is a political party in Tunisia.

== History and profile ==
Established in May 2011 as Union patriotique libérale and renamed to Union patriotique libre in June 2011, the party was founded and has been led by the British-Tunisian petroleum entrepreneur Slim Riahi who had been raised in his family's Libyan exile and had returned from London right after the Tunisian revolution in January 2011.

The party proposes free-market economy and a modern society and rejects Islamism.

The UPL has mainly been noted for its expensive and lavish electoral campaign. It has offered bus trips to party rallies to potential voters. As opposed to most other parties that rely on the voluntary commitment of their members, the Free Patriotic Union can afford to pay its candidates and campaigners. This has earned the party the accusation of "buying" candidates and supporters. Party leader's Riahi decision to buy 20% of the Dar Assabah media group raised suspicions of mixing business interests with political activity. At the same time, the party came into conflict with Tunisia's Independent High Authority for Elections (ISIE) because it continued its advertising campaign from 12 to 30 September, ignoring ISIE's ban of canvassing during this period.

In the parliamentary election in October 2011, the party received only 1.26% of the votes. However, in the Siliana district, the party managed to receive 6.3% of the votes and Noureddine Mrabti won the party's only seat for the Constituent Assembly. Together with twelve defectors from the Aridha Chaabia list, Mrabti founded the Liberty and democracy parliamentary group, which was later reorganized into the Democratic transition parliamentary group. However, only Hanène Sassi remained a permanent member of the party.

On 7 March 2013, it was announced that to create a new "centrist party of socialist-liberal orientation", seven minor parties decided to join forces with the UPL: the Third Alternative Party, the Modern Left Party, the Citizenship Movement, the Tunisian Liberal Party, the Social-Democratic Alternative, the Citizenship and Justice Party, and the Path of Will Party.

For the parliamentary election in October 2014, the party submitted lists to all 33 electoral districts. With 4.02% of the votes it managed to win 16 of the 217 seats in the Assembly of the Representatives, making it the third largest parliamentary group right after the two dominant parties Nidaa Tounes and Ennahda.

=== Resignations ===
In April 2016, UPL president Slim Riahi accused former UPL secretary general and current Minister of Youth and Sport Mehdi Ben Dhia of being to lax towards the Tunisian Football Federation, after the Riahi's Club Africain lost to Etoile Sportive du Sahel. Ben Dhia left the UPL after Riahi unsuccessfully called on Prime Minister Essid to replace him as minister. Later in May, the UPL lost three more deputies to Nidaa Tounes. The party subsequently announced it would "suspend its activities" in the coalition government.

Following a party meeting on 22 May in Sousse, Hatem El Euchi was appointed the party's new secretary general. Jamel Tlili who, obviously in absence, was appointed the new deputy secretary general, resigned within 24 hours from the party, claiming he had not even been made aware of his appointment or nomination. Two days later, executive director Samir Maghraoui also resigned from the UPL criticizing Riahi for "considering the party a one-man project".

In June, resigned UPL member Tlili accused Riahi and the UPL ministers Deriouche and El Euchi of "systemic corruption". Because of the corruption allegations, MP Taher Foudhil announced his resignation from the UPL later in August.

== Election results ==
| Election year | # of total votes | % of overall vote | # of seats |
Constituent Assembly of Tunisia
| 2011 | 51,655 | 1,26% | 1 / 217 |
Assembly of the Representatives of the People
| 2014 | 137,110 | 4,02% | 16 / 217 |
