= Mohamed Abbou (Tunisian politician) =

Tunisian lawyer and politician

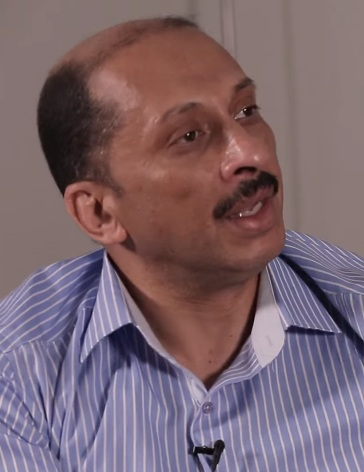
- Mohamed Abbou, 12 July 2019

Secretary General Democratic Current

Personal details
- Born: 10 May 1966 (age 60) Tunisia
- Party: Democratic Current; Congress for the Republic
- Spouse: Samia Abbou
- Occupation: Lawyer
- Profession: Politician

Mohamed Abbou (Arabic: محمد عبو), born on 10 May 1966 in Tunis, is a Tunisian lawyer and politician.

He was an adviser to the prime minister. From December 2011 to June 2012, Abbou was in charge of administrative reform in Jebali Cabinet. From May 2012 to March 2013, he was general secretary of the General Conference for the Republic (CPR). Abbou held the same position in his own party, the Democratic Current, until March 2016 and then continued until April 2019.

== Training ==
After receiving his master's degree of law and a DEA in criminology, on 28 August 2012 he presented a doctoral thesis on private law, at Tunis – El Manar University. The subject of his thesis was Limits of freedom of the press.

== Activities ==
His actions as a lawyer at the Court of Cassation of Tunis made Mohamed Abou known by his activism for human rights. He was also a member of the National Council for Liberties in Tunisia. At the same time, he was a member of the steering committee of the Young Lawyers Association. A young member of the executive board of the Tunis Center for the independence of the judiciary and the bar, also a leading member of his political party, Congress for the Republic.

Following his articles that were published on Tunisnews, a website of opposition to the regime of Zine el-Abidine Ben Ali, he was arrested on 1 March 2005 and on 29 April was sentenced to three years and six months in prison. This was especially for the articles titled Ben Ali – Sharon in which he compared Ben Ali to Israeli Prime Minister Ariel Sharon.

== Political responsibilities ==
After the 2011 revolution and the overthrow of the Ben Ali regime, he was elected on 23 October 2011 as a member of the Constituent Assembly of Tunisia in the Nabeul 1 constituency before being appointed on 24 December as adviser to the Prime Minister, in charge of Administrative Reform in the Hamadi Jebali government. Following the latter appointment, he preferred to resign from the Constituent to devote himself to his ministry.

On 13 May 2012, the national council of the CPR elected Abbou as its secretary general. He replaced Abderraouf Ayadi. On 13 May 2012, CPR's national council elected Abbou as the party ‘s Secretary General. He succeeded Abderraouf Ayadi5. On 30 June, however, at a press conference at the CPR headquarters, he announced his resignation from the government. He declared that his decision was an objection to the limited prerogatives that did not allow him to fight corruption. On 26 August, at the end of the party's congress, he was reinstated as Secretary General of the CPR.

On 27 March 2016, Ghazi Chaouachi succeeded him as Secretary General of the Democratic Movement. On 21 April 2019, he took over the head of the party to become a candidate for the 2019 Tunisian presidential election, at the second national congress.

== Private life ==
Mohamed Abbou is married to Samia Abbou, who is a member of constitution Assembly. They have three children.
