= Seifeddine Makhlouf =

Tunisian politician

Seifeddine Makhlouf سيف الدين مخلوف

Dignity Coalition Parliamentary group leader
- Incumbent
- Assumed office 13 November 2019

Deputy for 1st constituency of Tunis
- Incumbent
- Assumed office 13 November 2019

Spokesperson of Dignity Coalition
- Incumbent
- Assumed office February 2019

Personal details
- Born: Seifeddine Makhlouf; 12 August 1975 (age 51) Tunis, Tunisia
- Party: Dignity Coalition
- Children: 1
- Education: Faculty of Law and Political Sciences of Tunis
- Profession: Lawyer

Seifeddine Makhlouf ((Arabic: سيف الدين مخلوف), born 12 August 1975) is a Tunisian lawyer and politician.

Makhlouf was elected to the Assembly of the Representatives of the People in 2019 and he is the spokesperson and parliamentary group leader of Dignity Coalition.

Makhlouf was the Dignity Coalition candidate for the 2019 Tunisian presidential election in which he gained 147,351 votes in the first round, or 4.37% of the vote.

In June 2022, he was sentenced to a year in prison for insulting a judge.
