= Bourguibism =

Policies of the first Tunisian president, Habib Bourguiba

Bourguibism (Tunisian Arabic: البورقيبية il-Būrgībiyah, French: bourguibisme) refers to the policies of Habib Bourguiba, the first President of Tunisia, and his followers.

Bourguibism is defined by a strong commitment to national independence and specifically Tunisian nationalism (as opposed to pan-Maghrebi or pan-Arab ideas), a state capitalist approach on economic development, welfare state, a statist and corporatist interpretation of populism, strict secularism, and cultural modernity, advocating Tunisia's place as a bridge between Arab-Islamic and Western civilisation. While Bourguibists condemned Tunisians who had collaborated with the French colonial rulers, they did not repress the strong European cultural influence on Tunisia and French continued to be the language of higher education and elite culture. Bourguibism is sometimes described as a variety of Kemalism but with focus on the Tunisian identity.

As a political style or strategy, Bourguibism is characterised by intransigence in pursuing certain goals and non-negotiable principles combined with flexibility in negotiations and readiness to compromise considering the means to effectuate them. It is therefore described as pragmatic, non-ideological, moderate, and reformist rather than revolutionary, but determined and relentless at the same time. For example, despite being decidedly secularist, Bourguiba made sure to curtail the public role of Islam only carefully and gradually, in order not to arouse opposition from conservative Muslims.

== Political parties with Bourguibist platforms ==
- Neo Destour/Socialist Destourian Party/Democratic Constitutional Rally (1934–2011)
- National Destourian Initiative (2011–2019)
- El Watan Party (2011–2013)
- Nidaa Tounes (2012–)
- El Amal (2012–)
- Free Destourian Party (2013–)
- Machrouu Tounes (2016–)
- Tahya Tounes (2019–)
