= Dignity Coalition =

Tunisian political party

Dignity Coalition ائتلاف الكرامة
- Spokesperson: Seifeddine Makhlouf
- Founded: February 2019
- Split from: Ennahdha
- Ideology: Islamism; Francophobia; Social conservatism
- Political position: Far-right
- International affiliation: Muslim Brotherhood (accused)
- Colours: Green
- Assembly of the Representatives of the People: 0 / 161

The Dignity Coalition (Arabic: ائتلاف الكرامة, romanized: Itilaf al-Karama) or Al Karama is an Islamist political party in Tunisia that was founded in 2019 in response to Ennahdha abandoning Islamism.

== Election results ==
=== Parliamentary elections ===
| Election | Leader | Party list | | Seats | | |
| Election | Leader | # | % | # | ± | Position |
|---|---|---|---|---|---|---|
| 2019 | Seifeddine Makhlouf | 169,651 | 5.91 | 21 / 217 | New | 5th |

=== Presidential elections ===
| Election | Candidate | Votes | Percentage | Result |
|---|---|---|---|---|
| 2019 | Seifeddine Makhlouf | 147,351 | 4.37% | 8th |
