= Tunisian Alternative =

Tunisian political party

Tunisian Alternative البديل التونسي
- Leader: Mehdi Jomaa
- Founded: 29 March 2017
- Ideology: Centrism; Liberalism
- Assembly of the Representatives of the People: 0 / 161

Website
- www.albadilettounsi.net (Link dead) Wayback Machine (2019)

Tunisian Alternative (Arabic: البديل التونسي, al-Badil Ettounsi) is a Tunisian political party founded on 29 March 2017 by former prime minister Mehdi Jomaa.

== History ==
The party was founded by Jomaa in February 2016 as a think tank named Tunisia Alternatives. In 2018, it merged with Tounes Alawan.

== Ideology ==
The party aims to "unite Tunisians" and be "non-ideological" and "merit-based".
