= Mohsen Marzouk =

Tunisian politician

- محسن مرزوق
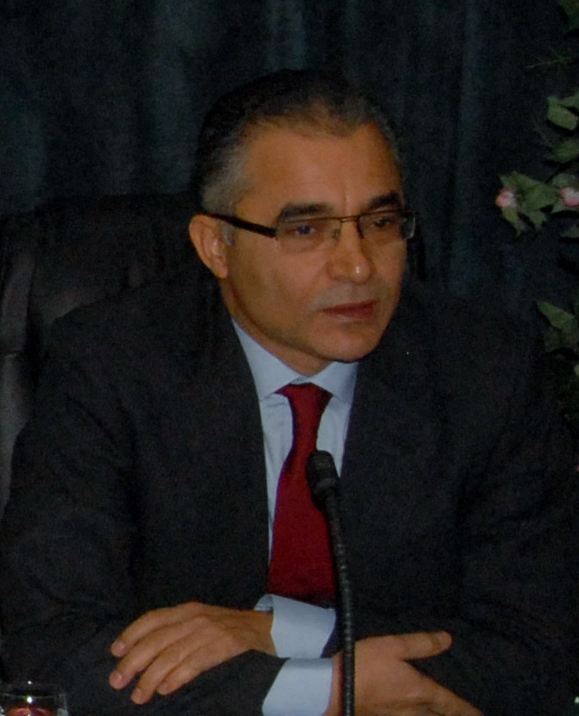

Personal details
- Born: July 1965 (age 60–61) Sfax, Tunisia
- Party: Machrouu Tounes

Mohsen Marzouk (Arabic: محسن مرزوق; born July 1965) is a Tunisian politician. He holds a degree in political sociology and International Relations from the International Studies Association in Tunis.

== Early life ==
Mohsen Marzouk was born in July 1965 and raised in a poor working-class neighborhood in the city of Sfax. At fourteen, he was expelled from school for his oppositional political activities. He managed to re-enter and finish high school in Sfax.

At the University of Tunis, Marzouk was a leading student activist. In 1987, while still enrolled, he was arrested by Tunisia's secret police. He was interrogated and tortured for many days before being sent to a labor camp in the southern desert.

When he was allowed to return, Marzouk remained politically active. He worked towards reinstating the General Union of Tunisian Students (UGET) which after Ben Ali's rise to power became deeply divided over its further political course. Marzouk was appointed to the UGET's executive bureau while at the same time, he was conspiratively active for the outlawed leftist movement El Amal Ettounsi.

== Career ==
From 1989 on, he worked as a coordinator for the newly founded Arab Institute for Human Rights. Since 2008 he has been secretary-general of the non-governmental Arab Democracy Foundation and member of the International Steering Committee of the Community of Democracies.

Marzouk is one of the founders of Nidaa Tounes and was member of the party's Executive Committee. As Beji Caid Essebsi's campaign manager in the 2014 presidential election he announced Essebsi's victory in the runoff vote on 21 December, stating that Tunisians were now turning the page of the transitional phase and that Tunisia was now a stable democracy. Marzouk’s faction within Nidaa Tounes supported a more assertive, secularist government. Marzouk left the party in early January 2016 and later became part of Machrouu Tounes.

== Publications and working papers ==
- Marzouk, M. (1997): The Associative Phenomenon in the Arab World: engine of democratisation or witness to the crisis? in: David Hulme and Michael Edwards (ed.): "NGOs, States and Donors. Too close for comfort?" New York: St. Martin's Press, 1997. Republished: London: Palgrave Macmillan, 2013, ISBN 9781137355140.
- Marzouk, M. (2003): Social Movements in Tunisia: Searching for the Absent. Arab Research Center, 2003.
- Marzouk, M. (2005): Social Movements in Tunisia and the Democratization Process. Santiago: Community of Democracies, 2005. (archived)
