= Movement Party (Tunisia) =

Tunisian political party

Movement Party حزب الحراك
- French name: Parti du Mouvement
- Founder: Moncef Marzouki
- Founded: 20 December 2015
- Preceded by: Congress for the Republic
- Headquarters: 41 Hedi Chaker, 1000 Tunis
- Newspaper: Tunisie Avenir (in French)
- Ideology: Social democracy Left-wing populism
- Political position: Centre-left
- International affiliation: Progressive Alliance
- Colors: red, silver
- Assembly of the Representatives of the People: 0 / 217

Website
- www.alirada.tn

The party's old logo before renaming

The Movement Party (Arabic: حزب الحراك, romanized: Ḥizb al-Harāk), previously known as the Tunisia Will Movement (Arabic: حراك تونس الإرادة, romanized: Harāk Tūnis al-Irādah) and by its shortened name Al-Irada (Arabic: الإرادة, romanized: al-Irādah, lit. 'The Will'), is a Tunisian political party that was founded on 20 December 2015 by former Tunisian president Moncef Marzouki.

== History ==
After his defeat in the 2014 presidential election, Moncef Marzouki announced that he would create a new political party before the end of 2015. It was given a temporary name, Citizen People Movement.

The party was officially established on 20 December 2015.

In September 2018, 80 executives and other members left the party. They justified their decision by the impossibility of reforming the party at the political and organizational levels as well as the presidential ambitions of Marzouki. The latter hindered the party from positioning seriously against the ruling coalition, according to a statement of the resigning members. They also accused the coalition of having plunged Tunisia into an unprecedented political crisis, contributed to the impoverishment of the people and the rooting of fraudulent and corrupt practices. Irada's spokesman Abdulwahid Yahyawi reacted to the wave of departures by calling them painful but predictable due to the conflicts that were dividing the party before.

In April 2019 after the defections, the party changed its name to the Movement Party.

== See also ==
- List of political parties in Tunisia
