= Tahya Tounes =

Tunisian political party

Tahya Tounes تحيا تونس
- French name: Vive la Tunisie
- Leader: Youssef Chahed
- Secretary-General: Selim Azzabi
- Spokesperson: Kamel Morjane
- Founder: Youssef Chahed
- Founded: 27 January 2019
- Legalized: 4 March 2019
- Split from: Nidaa Tounes
- Headquarters: 16, rue du Brésil. Tunis
- Membership (2019): 84,291
- Ideology: Bourguibism; Secularism; Liberalism
- Political position: Centre
- Assembly of the Representatives of the People: 0 / 217

Website
- tahyatounes.tn

Tahya Tounes (Arabic: تحيا تونس, French: Vive la Tunisie) is a secular party in Tunisia. Youssef Chahed was elected its president on 2 June 2019.
