= Machrouu Tounes =

Tunisian political party

Machrouu Tounes مشروع تونس
- Arabic name: مشروع تونس
- French name: Projet de la Tunisie
- Leader: Mohsen Marzouk
- Founded: 20 March 2016
- Split from: Nidaa Tounes
- Ideology: Big tent Secularism; Bourguibism; Tunisian nationalism Economic liberalism
- Political position: Centre-left to centre-right
- Colors: red, black
- Assembly of the Representatives of the People: 0 / 161

Website
- www.machrou3na.com

Machrouu Tounes (Arabic: مشروع تونس; French: Projet de la Tunisie; English: Project Tunisia) is a big tent secularist Tunisian political party founded on 20 March 2016 by Mohsen Marzouk as a breakaway from Nidaa Tounes, the then ruling party. It includes members of the centre-left and centre-right, as well as nationalists.
