= Democratic Current =

Tunisian political party

Democratic Current التيار الديمقراطي
- General Secretary: Nabil Hajij
- Founder: Mohamed Abbou
- Founded: 30 May 2013; 11 years ago
- Headquarters: Rue de Marseille Tunis
- Youth wing: Democratic Students Current
- Ideology: Social democracy Arab nationalism Progressivism; Pan-Arabism
- Political position: Centre-left
- Colours: Orange
- Slogan: "Conscience, will, realization"
- Assembly of the Representatives of the People: 0 / 161

Website
- www.attayar.net^{[usurped]}

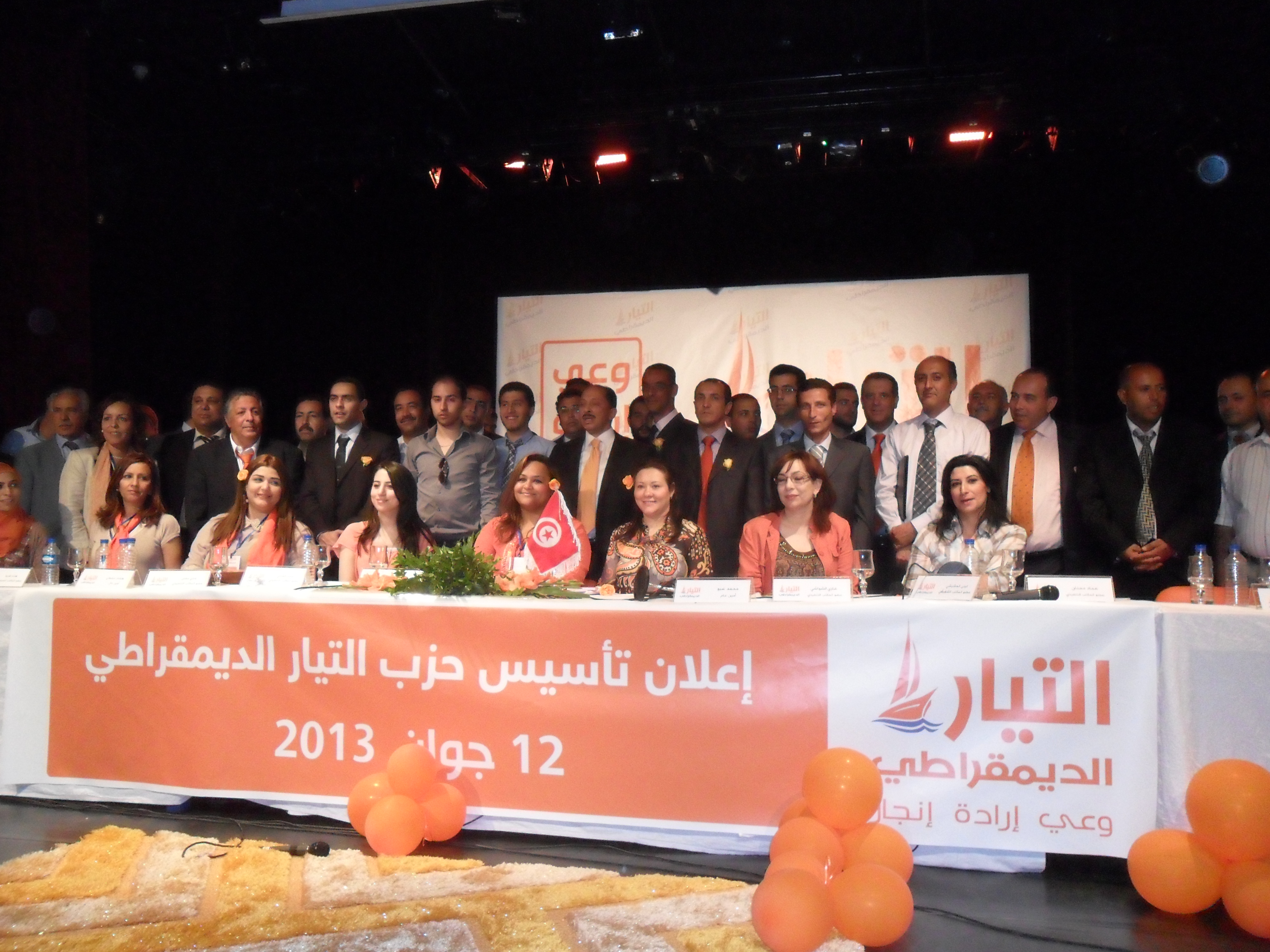
Foundation ceremony on 12 June 2013

The Democratic Current (Arabic: التيّار الديمُقراطي, romanized: at-Tayyār ad-Dīmuqrāṭī) is a social-democratic political party in Tunisia that was founded in 2013.

The party was initiated by the former secretary-general of the Congress for the Republic, Mohamed Abbou who also served as deputy prime minister in the Jebali Cabinet until June 2012. It is committed to the project of realizing an "Arab federal state reuniting the Arab nations freed from the yoke of dictatorship".

After the 2019 Tunisian parliamentary election, the party agreed to form a parliamentary bloc with the People's Movement.

== Election results ==
=== Parliamentary elections ===
Election	Leader	Party list		Seats		
Election	Leader	#	%	#	±	Position
2014	Mohamed Abbou	66,396	1.95	3 / 217	▲3	7th
2019	Mohamed Abbou	183,464	6.42	22 / 217	▲19	▲4th

=== Municipal elections ===
Election	Leader	Party list		Seats		
Election	Leader	#	%	#	±	Position
2018	Ghazi Chaouachi	75 619	4,19	205 / 7,212	▲205	3rd
