= Nidaa Tounes =

Tunisian political party

Nidaa Tounes حركة نداء تونس
- Chairperson: Khemaies Jhinaoui
- Secretary General: Kassem Makhlouf
- Founder: Beji Caid Essebsi
- Founded: 16 June 2012; 13 years ago
- Headquarters: 3, rue du Lac de Garde; Les Berges du Lac; 1053 Tunis
- Youth wing: Nidaa Tounes Youth Movement
- Membership (2014): 110,000
- Ideology: Bourguibism; Social democracy Secularism
- Political position: Centre to centre-left and Big tent
- Colours: Red
- Slogan: "Call of Tunisia, A call for all Tunisians"
- Assembly of the Representatives of the People: 0 / 161

Website
- nidaatounes.org

Nidaa Tounes (Arabic: حركة نداء تونس Ḥarakat Nidā’ Tūnis, French: Appel de la Tunisie; usually translated as "Call of Tunisia", "Call for Tunisia", or "Tunisia's Call") is a big tent secularist political party in Tunisia. After being founded in 2012, the party won a plurality of seats in the October 2014 parliamentary election. The party's founding leader Beji Caid Essebsi was elected President of Tunisia in the 2014 presidential election.

== History ==
=== Foundation ===
The party's foundation was announced when former prime minister Beji Caid Essebsi on 20 April 2012 launched his Call for Tunisia as a response to post-revolutionary "instances of disturbing extremism and violence that threaten public and individual liberties, as well as the security of the citizens". It was officially founded on 16 June 2012 and describes itself as a "modernist" and "social-democratic" party of the moderate left. However, it also includes notable economically liberal currents.

The party has patched together former members of ousted president Ben Ali's Constitutional Democratic Rally, secular leftists, progressive liberals and Destourians (followers of Tunisia's "founder" Habib Bourguiba). In addition, the party has the support of many members of the Tunisian General Labour Union (UGTT) and the national employers' union, UTICA. They believe that Tunisia's secular forces have to unite to counter the dominance of the Islamist Ennahda Movement.

From its foundation until July 2013, 11 members of the Constituent Assembly joined the party by defecting from various other parties.

=== Union for Tunisia ===
On 11 February 2013, the Republican Party joined Nidaa Tounes and four other parties in a political alliance called Union for Tunisia (UPT). Moreover, it participated in the formation of the broad oppositional National Salvation Front in July 2013. However, ahead of the October 2014 legislative election, Nidaa Tounes decided to run its own lists and not to contest the election as part of the UPT.

=== 2014 to present ===
The party has seen tensions between supporters of Essebsi's son, Hafedh Essebsi, and others. Former member Mohsen Marzouk went on to create a party named Machrouu Tounes while prime minister Youssef Chahed formed a new party named Tahya Tounes.

== Prominent members ==
- Beji Caid Essebsi, former president of the party, former prime minister of the 2011 post-revolution transitional government, former minister under Habib Bourguiba
- Taïeb Baccouche, the party's secretary-general, former secretary-general of the Tunisian General Labour Union, former president of the Arab Institute of Human Rights, minister of education in the post-revolution transitional government led by Essebsi (2011)
- Faouzi Elloumi, a wealthy businessman and member of the executive committee
- Mohsen Marzouk, member of the executive committee charged with external relations
- Mahmoud Ben Rhomdane, one of the party's chief economic advisors
- Lazhar Karoui Chebbi, former minister of justice in Essebsi's cabinet (2011)
- Boujemaa Remili, former leader of the Tunisian Communist Party
- Wafa Makhlouf Sayadi, head of the Center for Young Corporate Leaders (CJD)
- Ridha Belhaj, one of the party founders, actual Chief of Staff of the Tunisian presidency and former Chief Cabinet Secretary in Beji Caid Essebsi's 2011 post-revolution transitional government.
- Faïza Kefi, member of the first executive committee

== Election results ==
Election year	# of total votes	% of overall vote	# of seats	Government
Assembly of the Representatives of the People
2014	1,279,941	37.56%	86 / 217	Coalition (2014-2019)
2014	1,279,941	37.56%	86 / 217	Opposition (2019)
2019	43,213	1.51%	3 / 217	Coalition (2020-2020)
2019	43,213	1.51%	3 / 217	Opposition (2020-present)
