= 2014 Tunisian presidential election =

- 23 November 2014 (first round); 21 December 2014 (second round)
- Registered: 5,285,625
- Turnout: 63.18% (first round); 60.34% (second round)
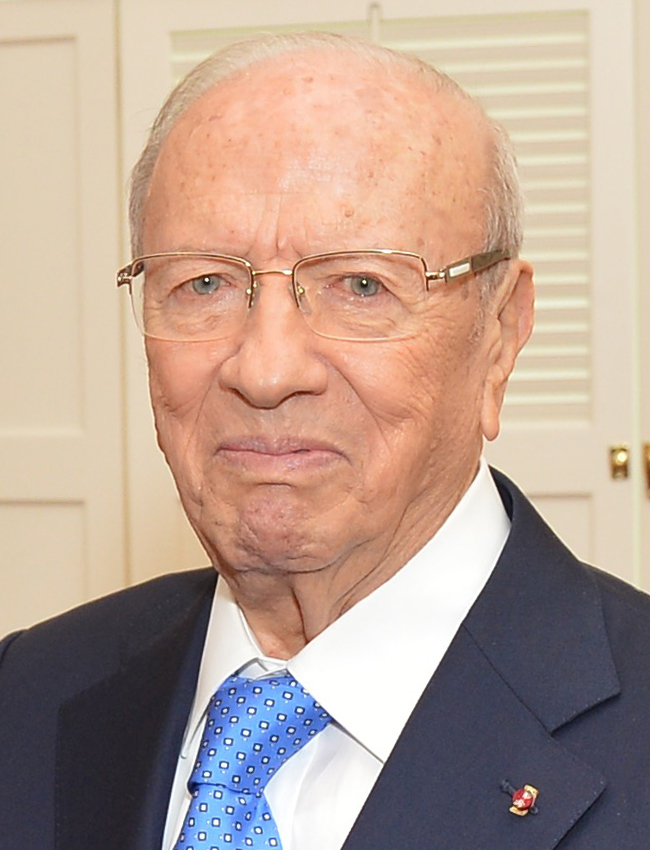

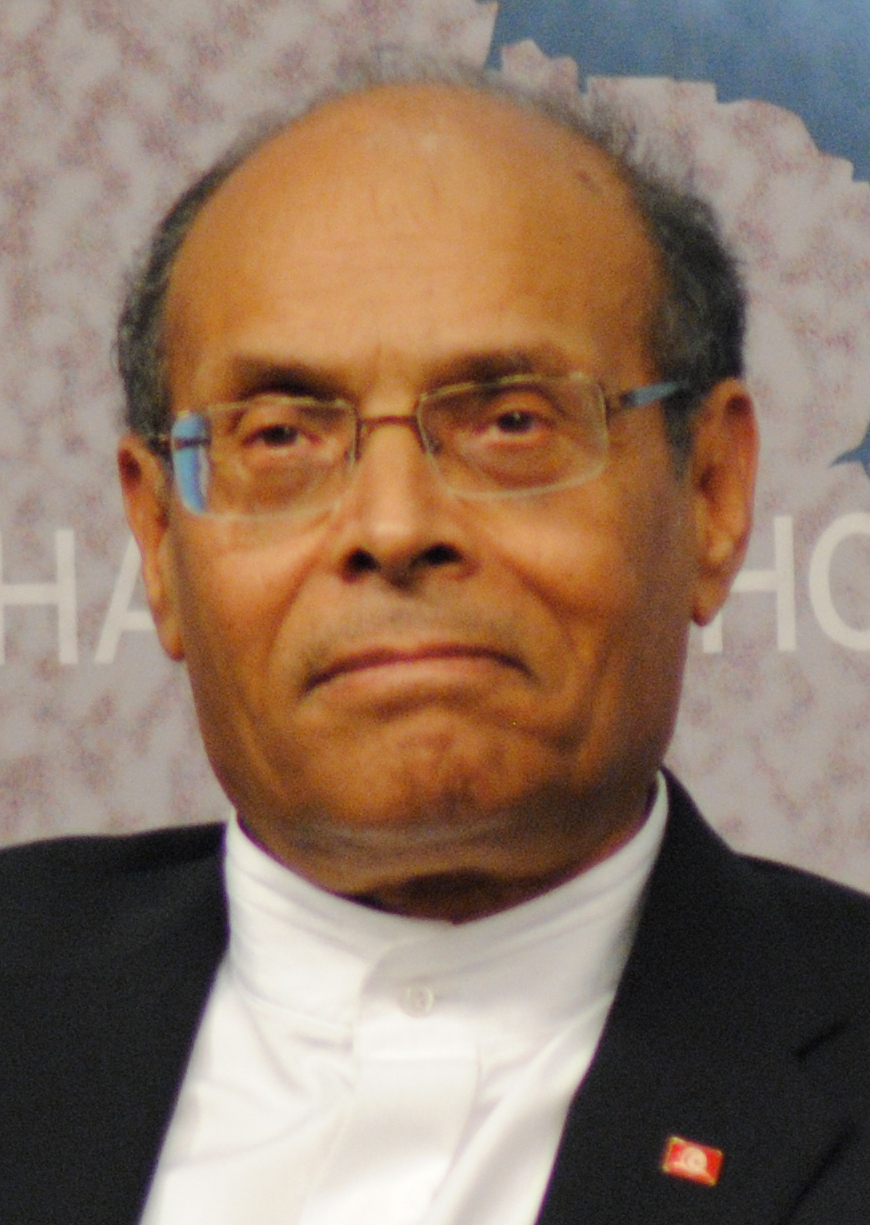
| Candidate | Beji Caid Essebsi | Moncef Marzouki |
| Party | Nidaa Tounes | CPR |
| Popular vote | 1,731,529 | 1,378,513 |
| Percentage | 55.68% | 44.32% |
President before election
Moncef Marzouki
CPR
Elected President
Beji Caid Essebsi
Nidaa Tounes

Presidential elections were held in Tunisia on 23 November 2014, a month after parliamentary elections. They were the first free and fair presidential elections since the country gained independence in 1956, and the first direct presidential elections after the Tunisian Revolution of 2011 and the adoption of a new Constitution in January 2014.

As no candidate won a majority in the first round, a second round between incumbent Moncef Marzouki and Nidaa Tounes candidate Beji Caid Essebsi took place on 21 December. Official results released on 22 December showed that Essebsi won the elections with 56% of the vote.

== Background ==
Protests in Tunisia began in December 2010 with riots in Sidi Bouzid after Mohamed Bouazizi set himself alight in protest against the confiscation of his fruit and vegetable cart. The riots then spread across the country and continued into 2011. Days after a curfew was imposed in the capital Tunis amid continuing conflagrations, President Zine El Abidine Ben Ali left the country. Ben Ali's Prime Minister Mohamed Ghannouchi briefly took over as acting president before he handed power over to parliamentary speaker Fouad Mebazaa after the head of Tunisia's Constitutional Court, Fethi Abdennadher, declared that Ghannouchi did not have the right to take power and Mebazaa would have 60 days to organise a new general election. For his part, Mebazaa said it was in the country's best interest to form a national unity government.

Ben Ali's Constitutional Democratic Rally considered changing its name (retaining the "Constitution" part in some form) and running in the general election on an anti-Islamist platform. However, the party was banned on 6 February 2011 and dissolved on 9 March 2011.

Upon being elected in 2011, the Troika coalition made a "moral pledge" to cede power within a year. However, Ennahdha and its allies, the Congress for the Republic and Ettakatol, were still in power and the Constituent Assembly had not finalized a new constitution. This led to the opposition accusing the government of overstaying their implicit term and also of using intimidation to try to silence dissent. The opposition also accused the government of using the Constituent Assembly to push through legislation that would enable them to stay in power. Former speaker of the Assembly, Ettakatol's Mustapha Ben Jaafar, then supported the opposition's call for a non-partisan government after he dissolved the assembly in August. Ennahda, on the other hand, feared that some parts of the opposition were trying to keep it from regaining power and had been emboldened by the August 2013 Egyptian raids. At the same time, a Gallup poll suggested that Tunisians were losing faith in their government.

The head of the Higher Political Reform Commission, Yadh Ben Achour, warned that Tunisia risked anarchy if the transitional period was not handled with care, as institutions and mechanisms of the state were either in disarray or still tainted by links to Ben Ali's regime. Ben Achour also stated that the commission was unsure whether it would be better to reform the constitution or elect a constitutional assembly to write a completely new one, but that it had to be decided soon, as the public was growing tired of waiting. He also confirmed elections would not be held by 15 March 2011 as theoretically stipulated by the constitution, pointing to force majeure as legitimate grounds for taking longer until the election. The election was delayed further by the annulment of 36 candidates who were elected to Tunisia's Board of Elections. The election board was created by giving the candidates' lists to the Constituent Assembly, thus bypassing the judiciary, which cannot review plenary sessions of the Constituent Assembly. The electoral law, which did not include a ban on former regime officials running from office, was approved on 1 May 2014. The filing period for presidential candidates lasted from 8 September until 22 September.

== Dates ==
The interim government announced on 25 February 2011 that the election would be held by mid-July "at the latest". The constitution of Tunisia mandates an election to occur within 45 to 60 days of the Constitutional Council's declaration of the presidency being vacant, but there were calls by the opposition to delay the elections and hold them only within six or seven months, with international supervision. The elections were then delayed until late 2013. On 15 March 2013, the constituent assembly voted 81–21 to hold elections between 15 October 2013 and 15 December 2013.

As a result of the assassination of Mohamed Brahmi and ensuing protests, which called for the dismissal of the government and the dissolution of the government, that turned violent, Prime Minister Ali Larayedh set 17 December as the date of the election. He said: "This government will stay in office: we are not clinging to power, but we have a duty and a responsibility that we will exercise to the end. We think that the National Constituent Assembly will complete the electoral code by October 23 at the latest so elections can be held on December 17." This followed Education Minister Salem Labiadh submitting his resignation and calls by Ennahda ally Ettakatol to dissolve the government. Lobni Jribi said: "We have called for the dissolution of the government in favour of a new unity government that would represent the broadest form of consensus. If Ennahda refuses this suggestion, we will withdraw from government." A government of independents was sworn in on 29 January 2014.

== Candidates ==
Ennahda announced on 8 September 2014 that it would not put forth a presidential candidate. Beji Caid Essebsi submitted his candidacy on 9 September 2014. Kamel Morjane, a foreign minister under former president Zine El Abidine Ben Ali, announced on 13 September 2014 that he would run for the presidency. Incumbent president Moncef Marzouki announced on 20 September 2014 that he would run for re-election. Other candidates included Mohamed Hechmi Hamdi, Mustapha Kamel Nabli, Ahmed Najib Chebbi, Mustapha Ben Jafar and Mondher Zenaidi. 27 candidates were allowed to run out of the 70 who applied. Five candidates withdrew before the election: Abderraouf Ayadi, Abderrahim Zouari (throwing his support to Essebsi), Mohamed Hamdi, Noureddine Hached and Mustapha Kamel Nabli.

The final list of presidential candidates included:

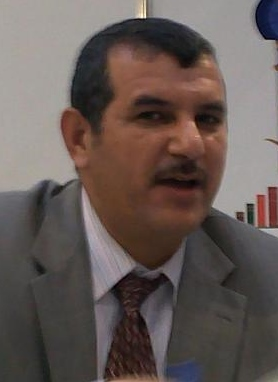
Hechmi Hamdi
Current of Love

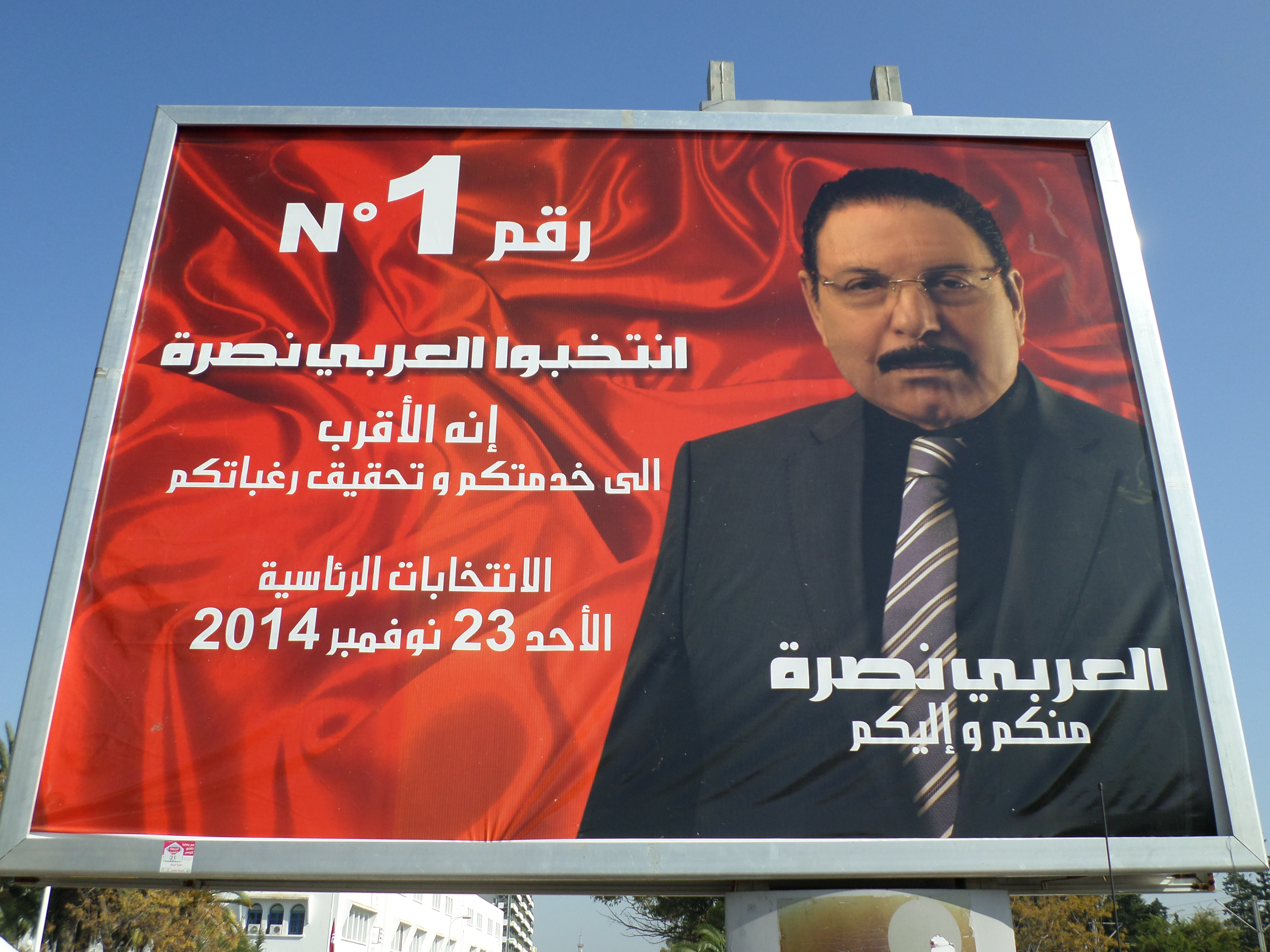
Larbi Nasra
Voice of the People of Tunisia

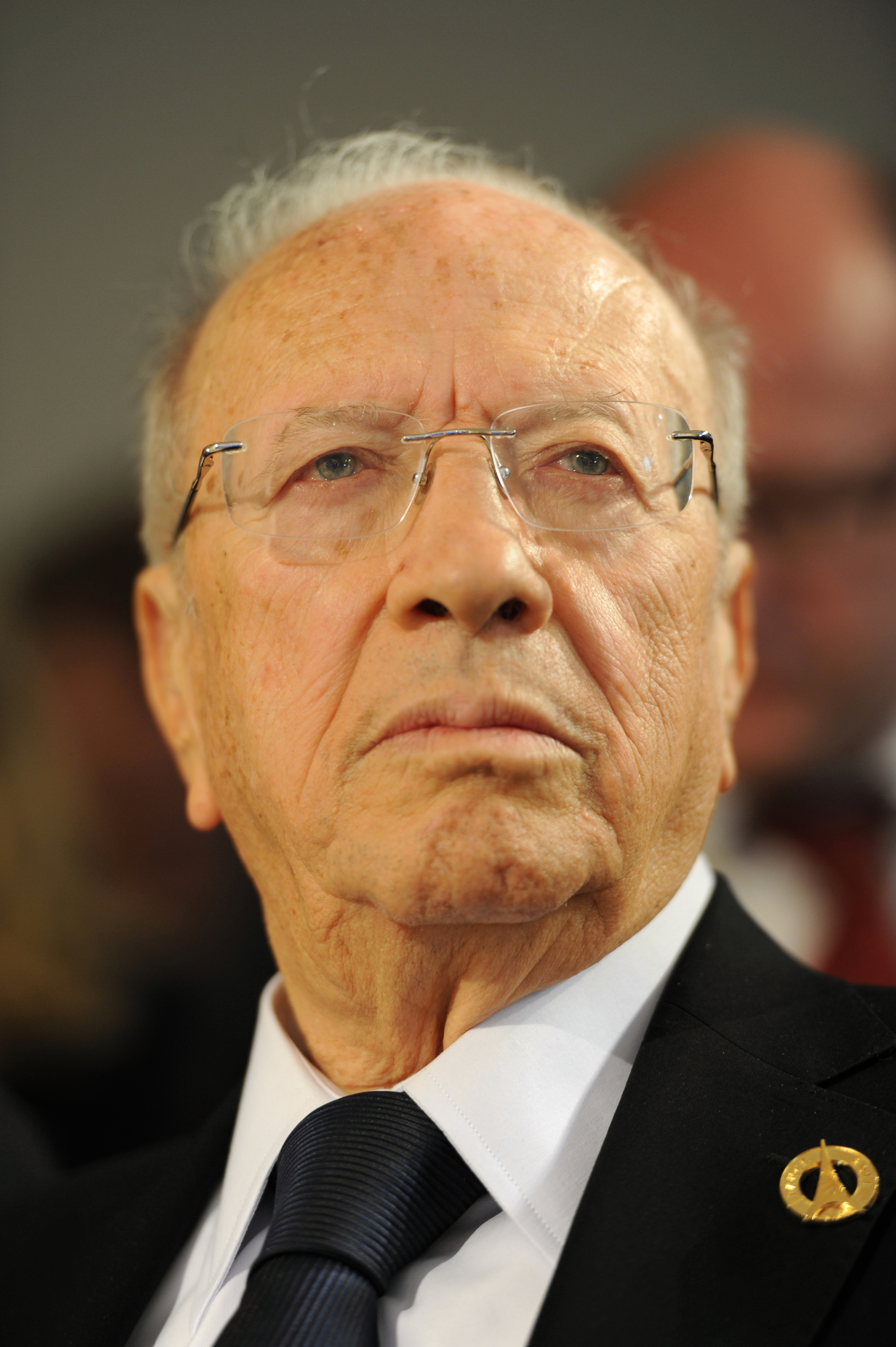
Beji Caid Essebsi
Nidaa Tounes

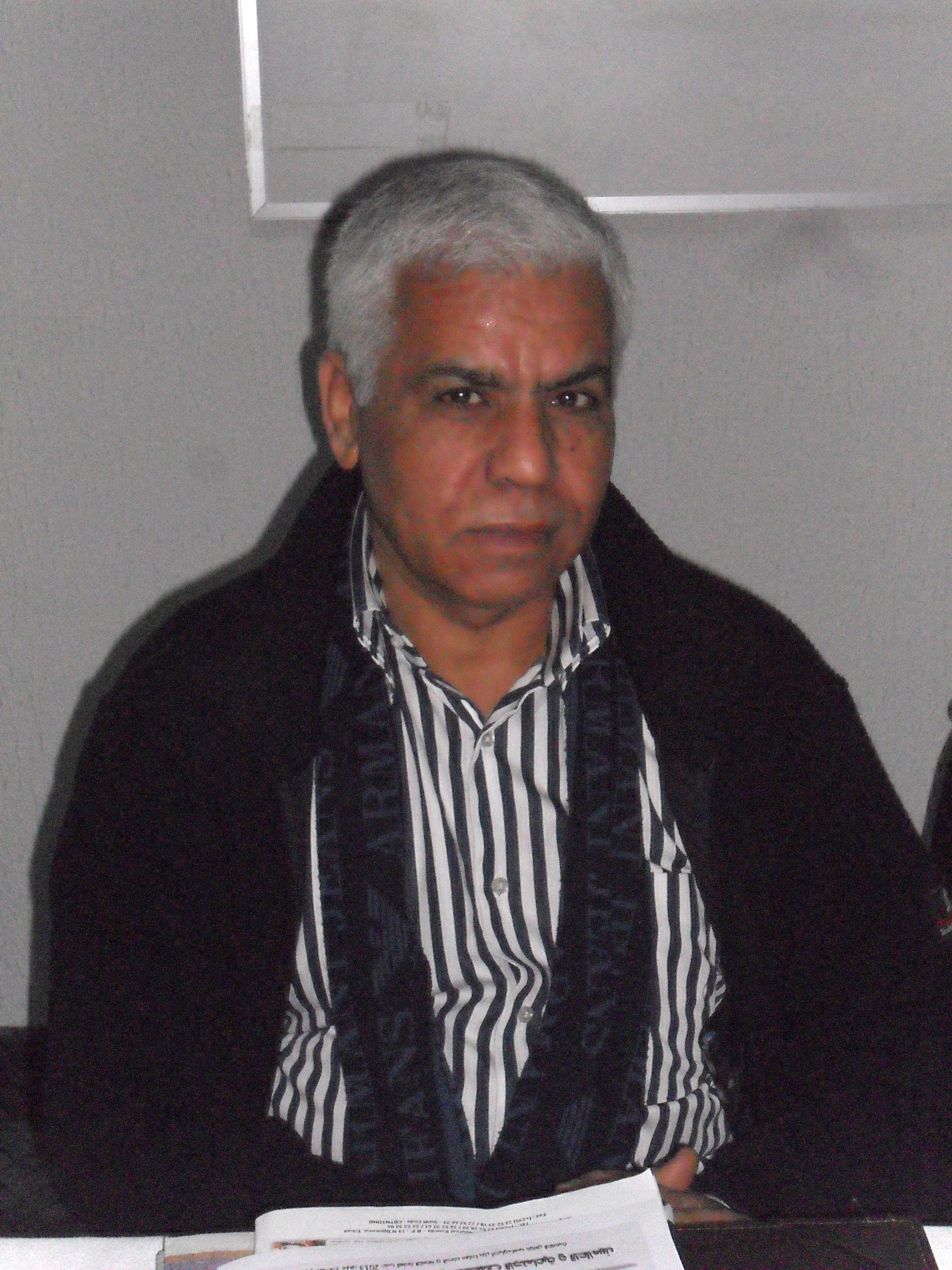
Safi Saïd
Independent

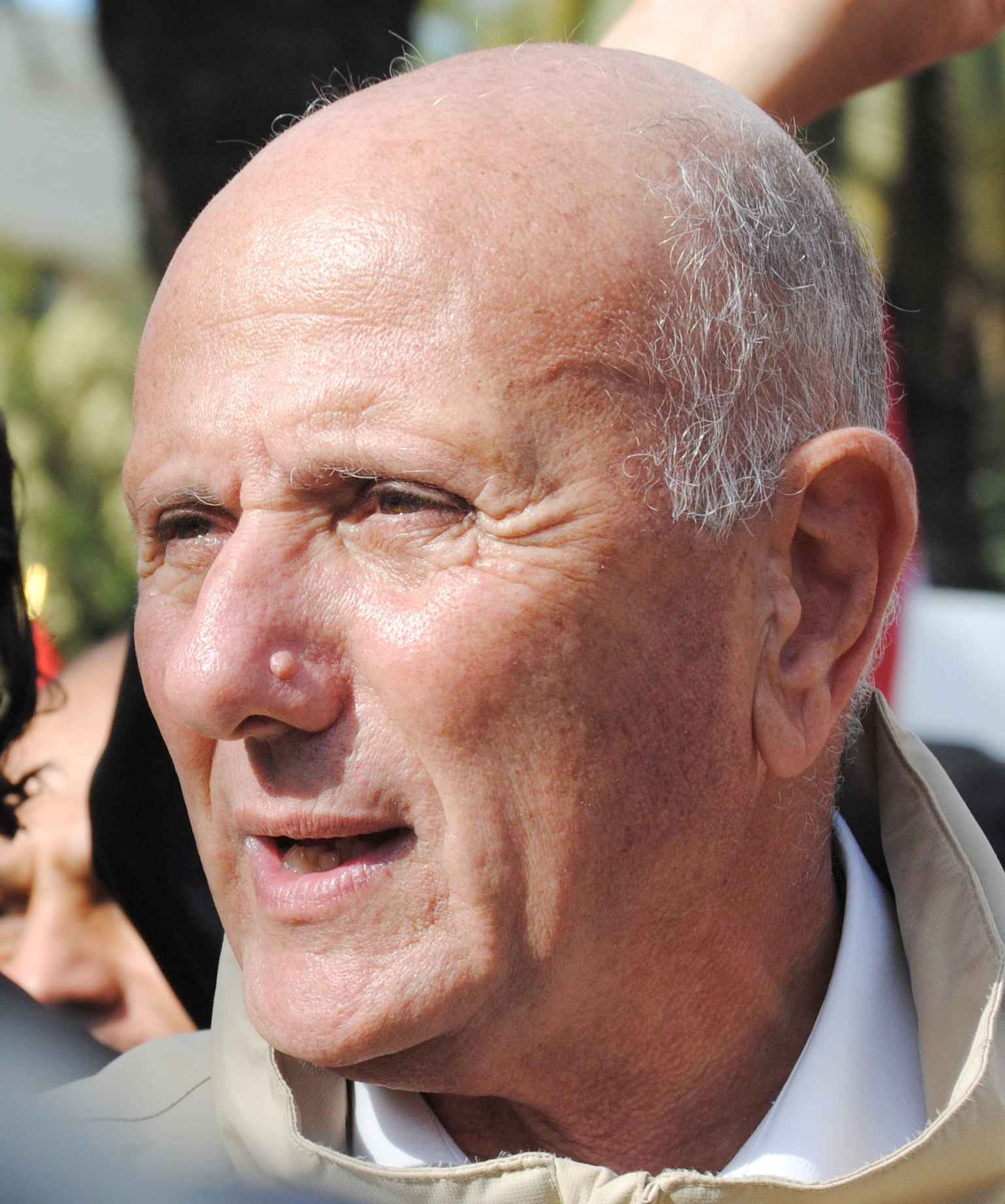
Ahmed Néjib Chebbi
Republican Party

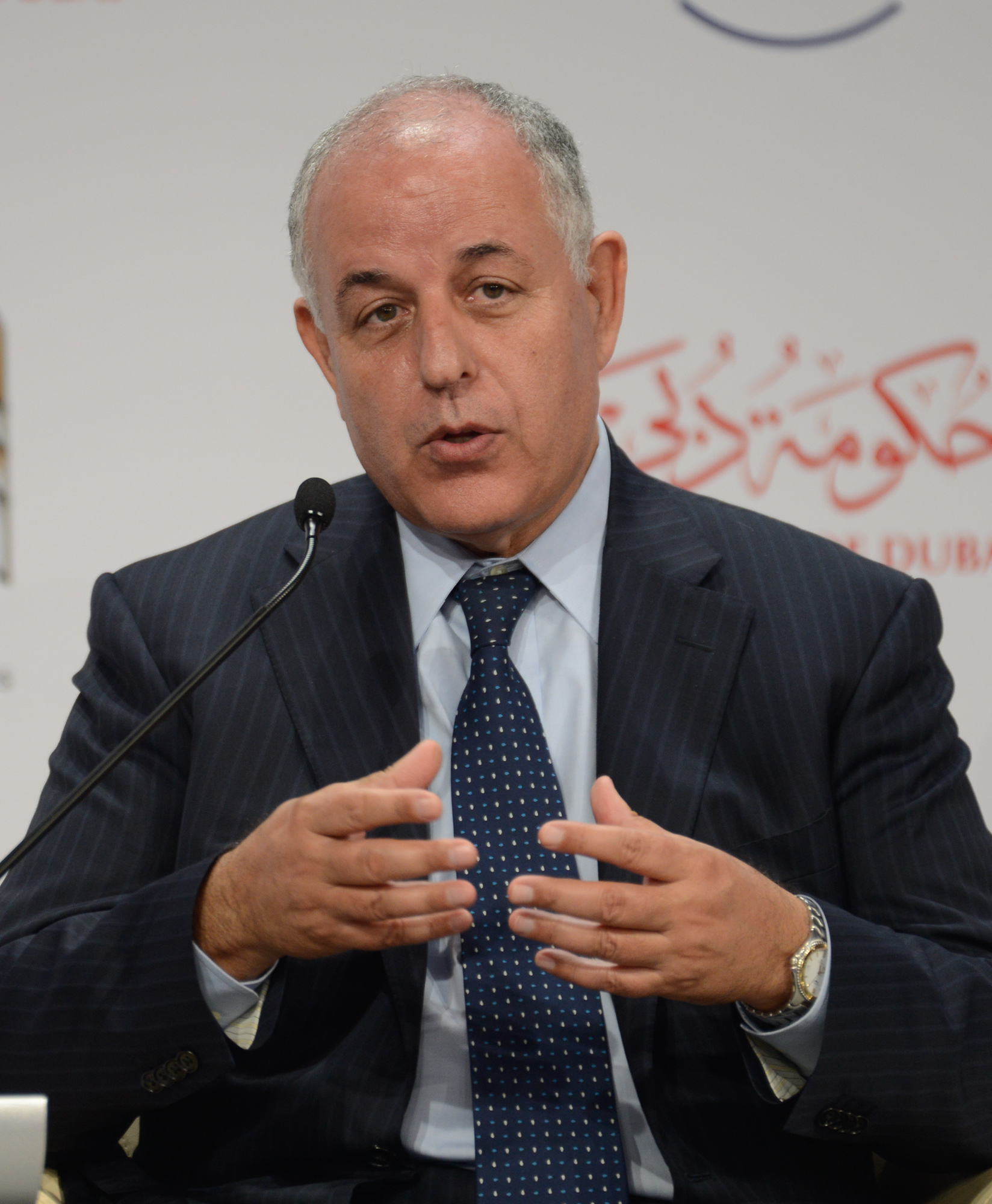
Mustapha Kamel Nabli
Independent
Withdrew

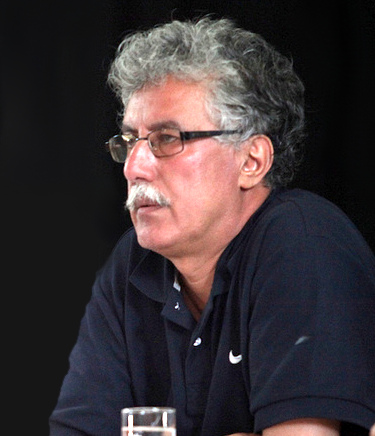
Hamma Hammami
Popular Front

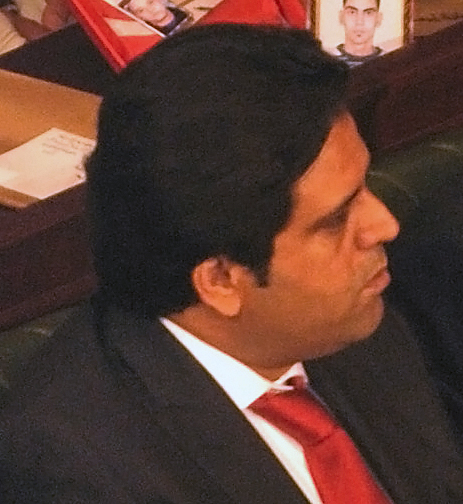
Slim Riahi
Free Patriotic Union

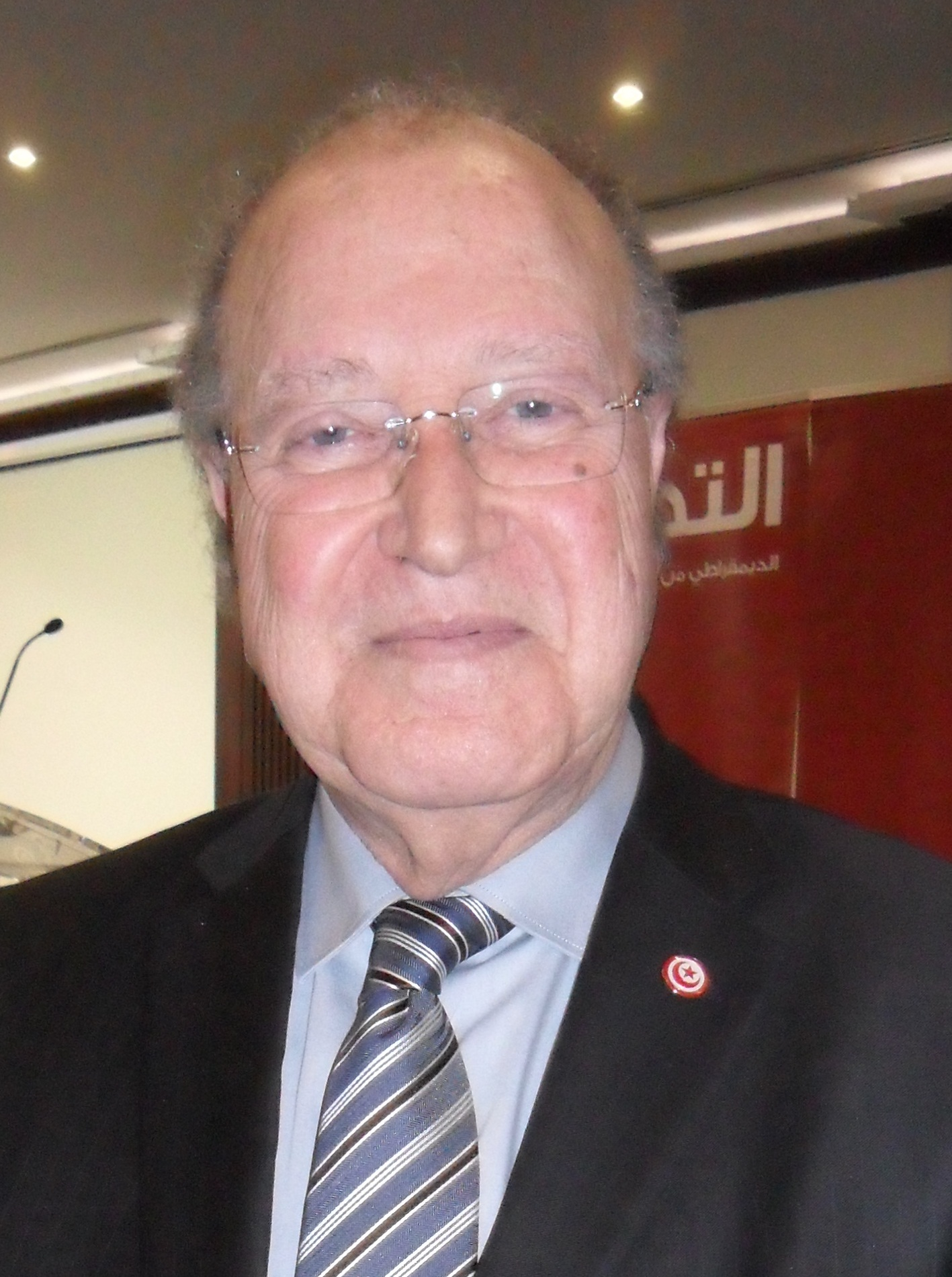
Mustapha Ben Jaafar
Ettakatol

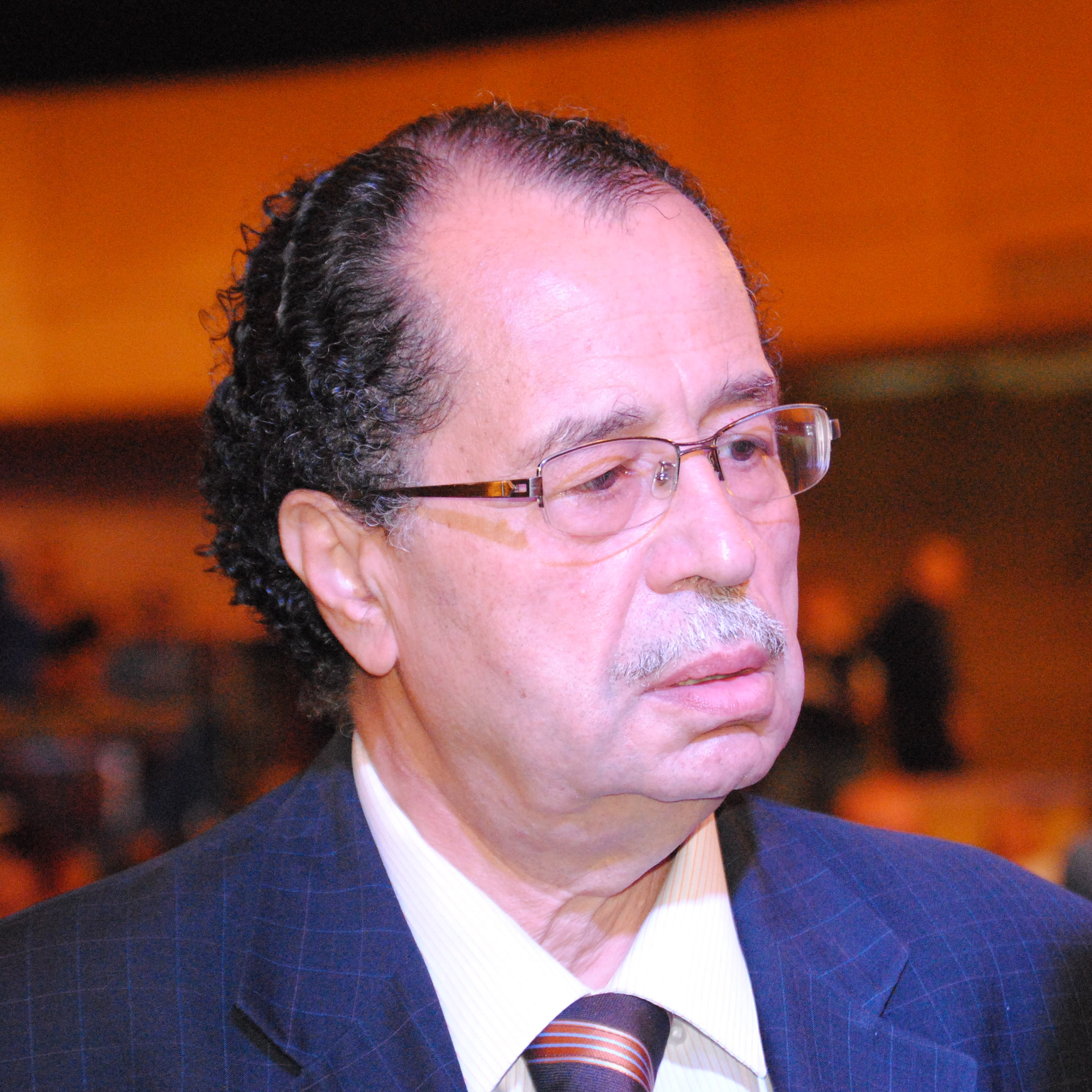
Noureddine Hached
Independent
Withdrew

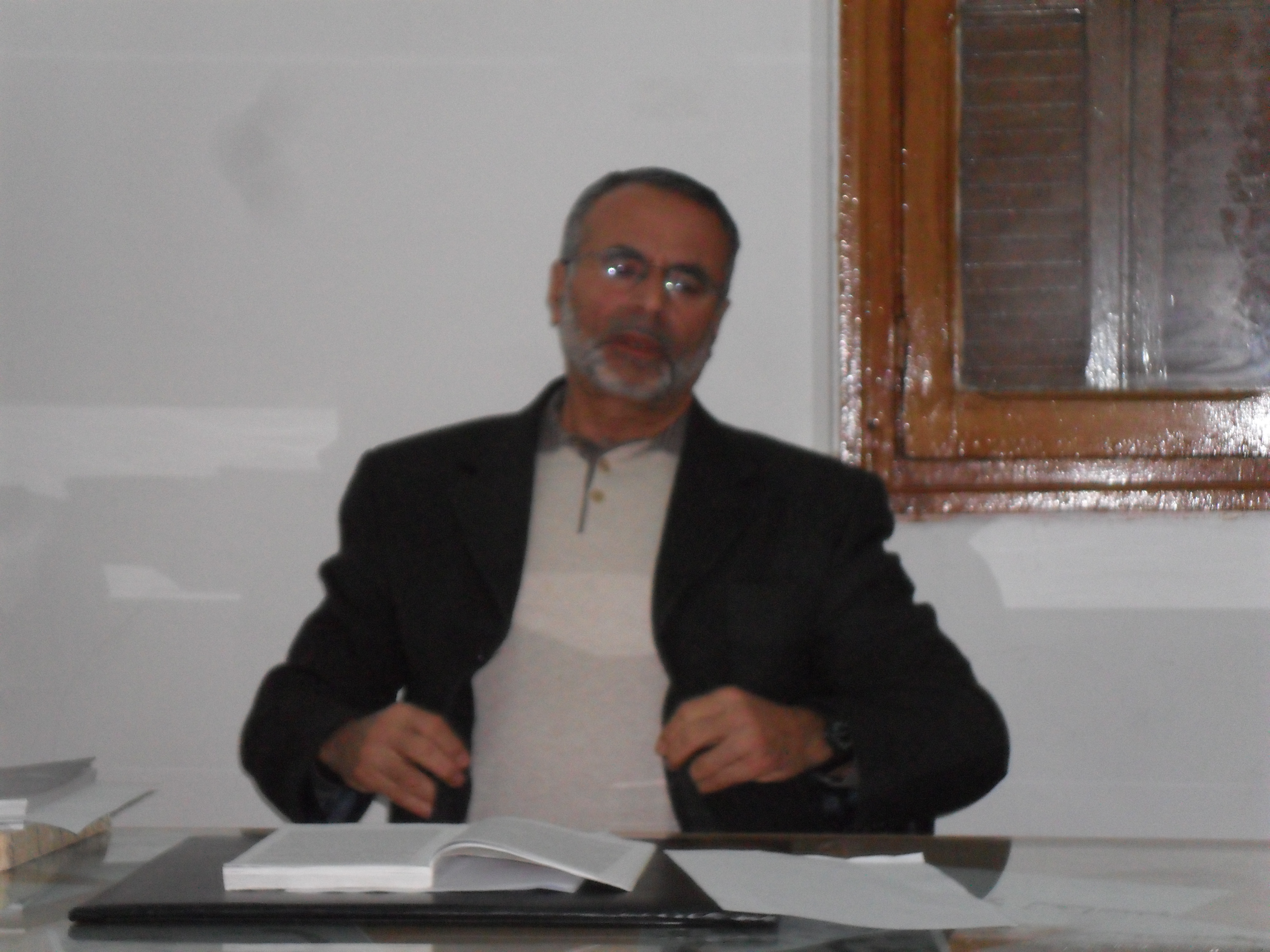
Abderraouf Ayadi
Wafa Movement
Withdrew

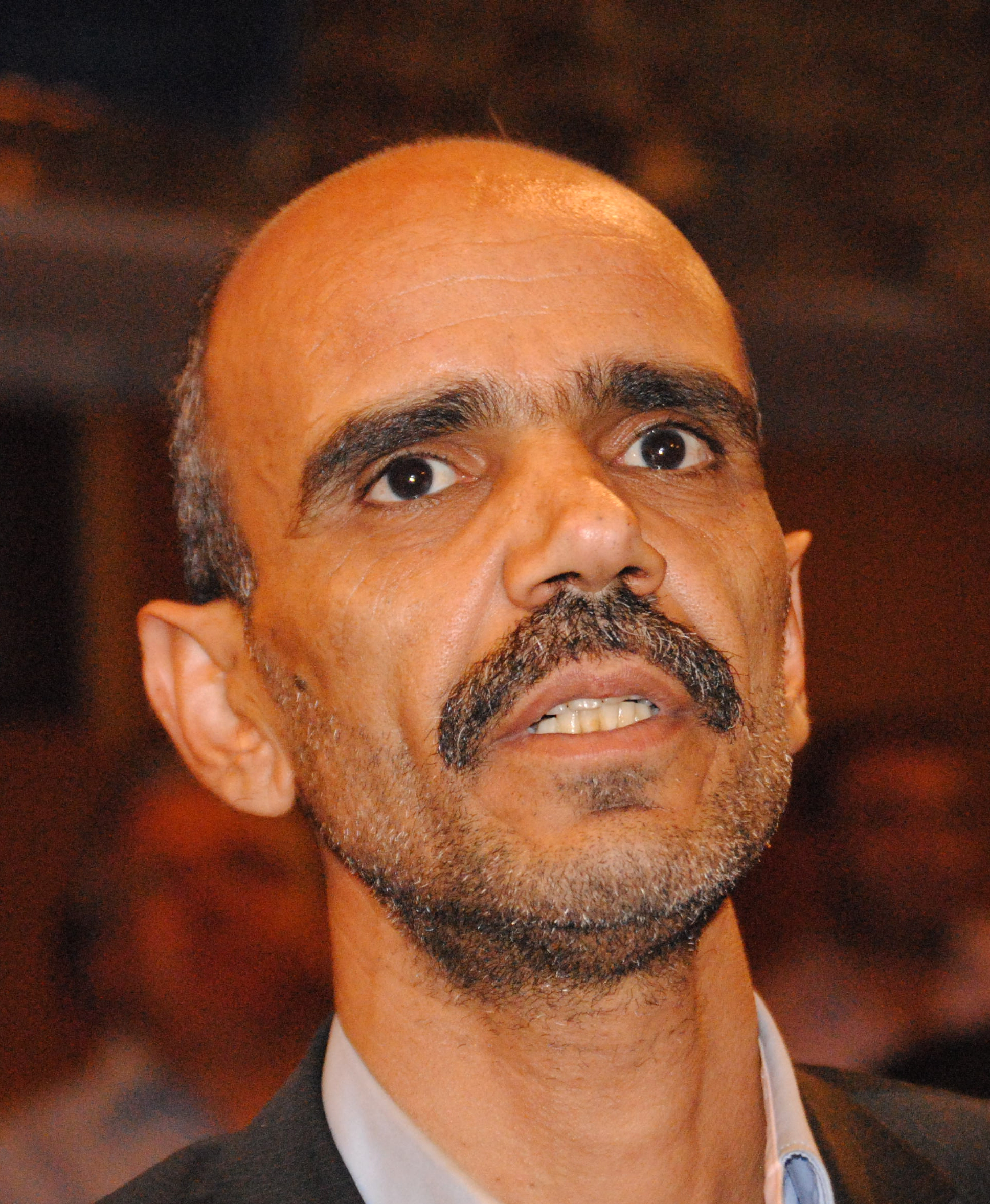
Mohamed Hamdi
Democratic Alliance Party
Withdrew

Abderrahim Zouari
Destourian Movement
Withdrew

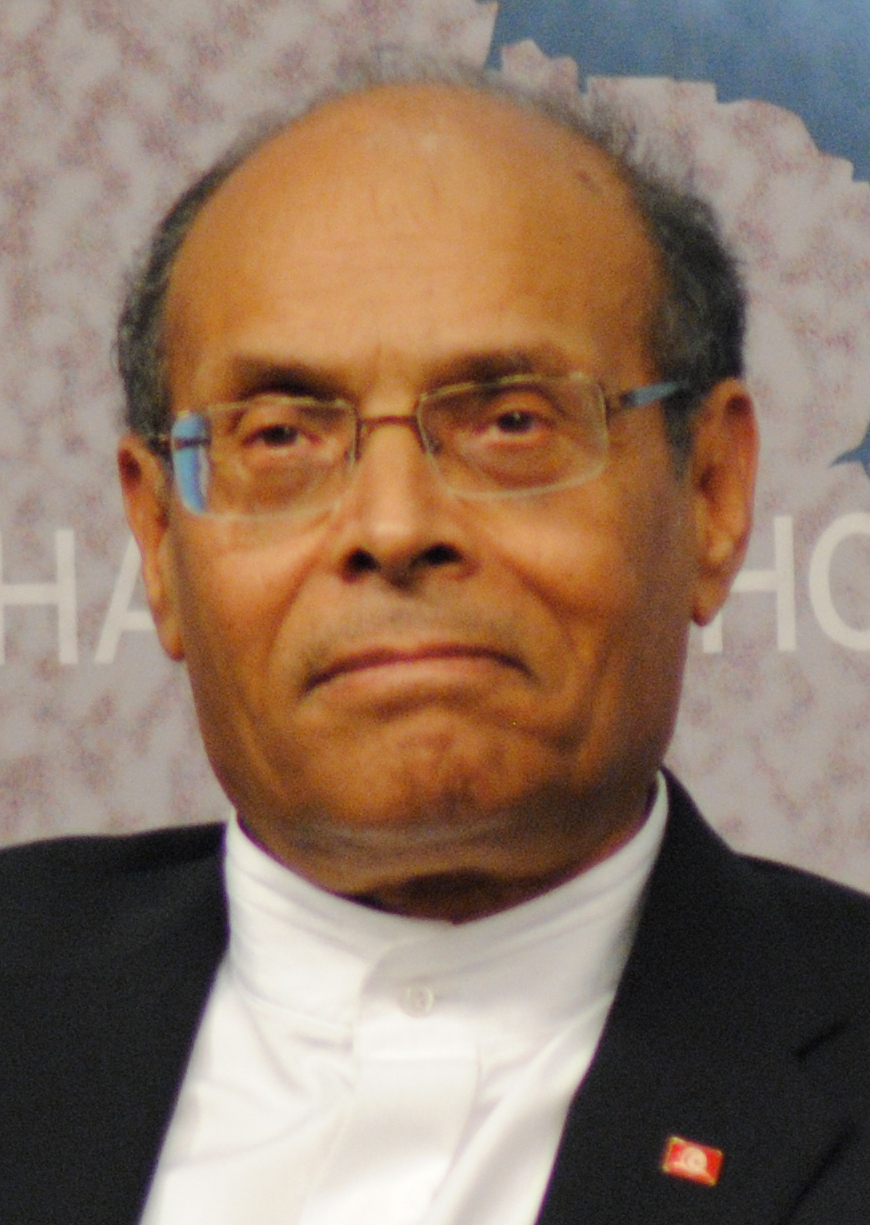
Moncef Marzouki
CPR

Kalthoum Kannou
Independent

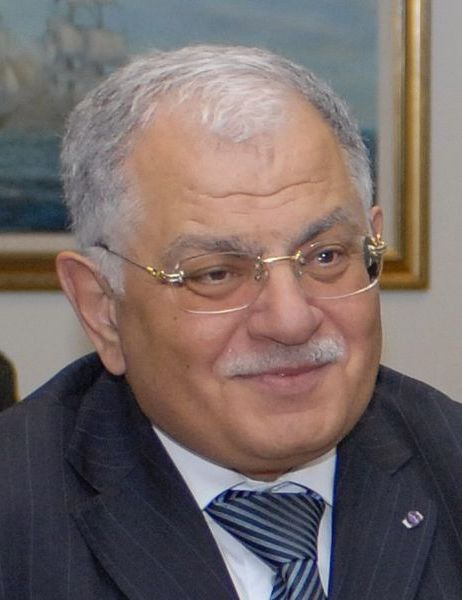
Kamel Morjane
Initiative

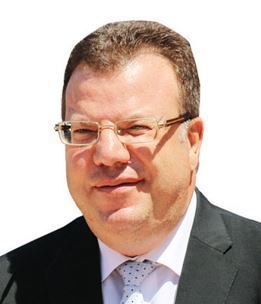
Mohamed Frikha
Independent

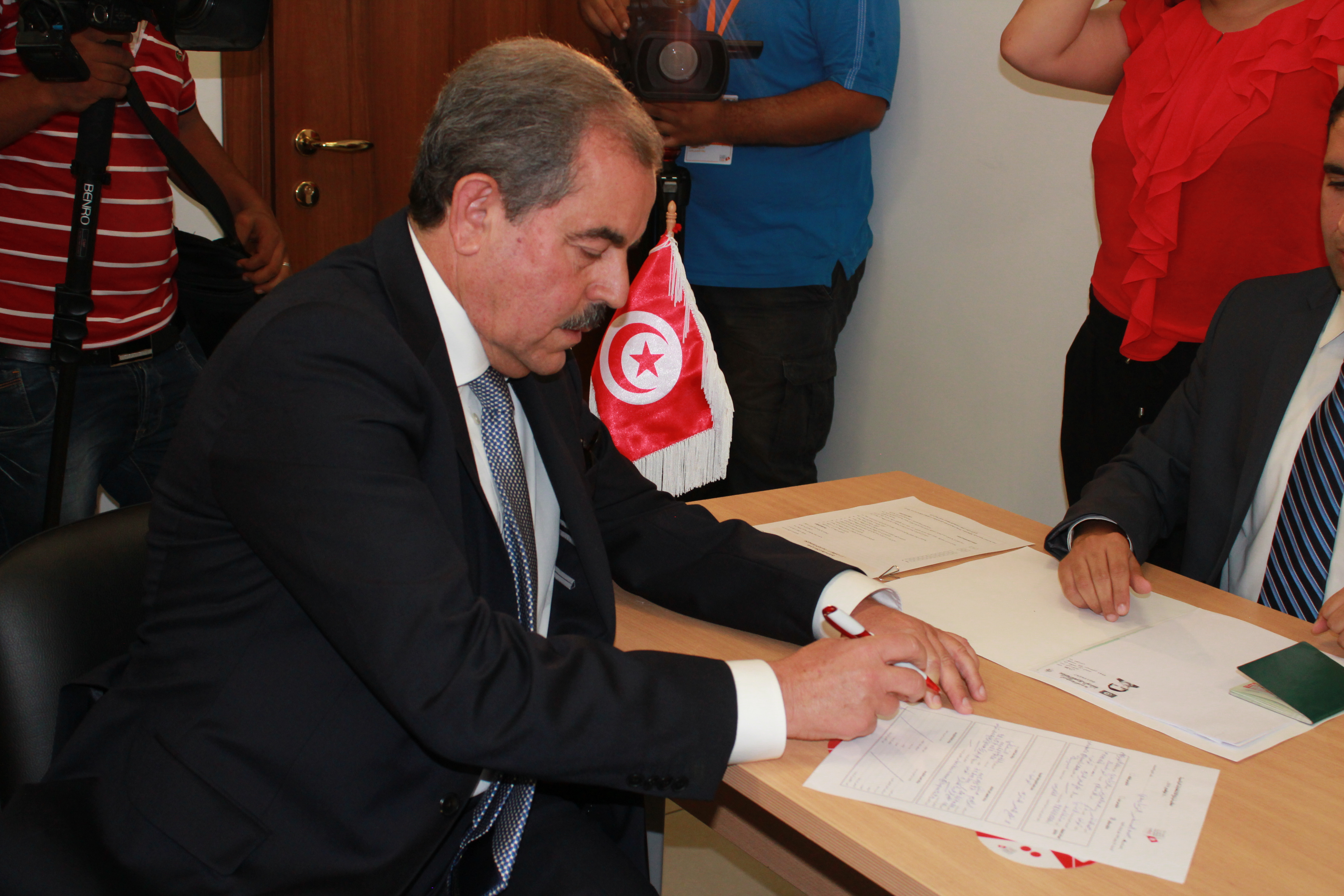
Mondher Zenaidi
Independent

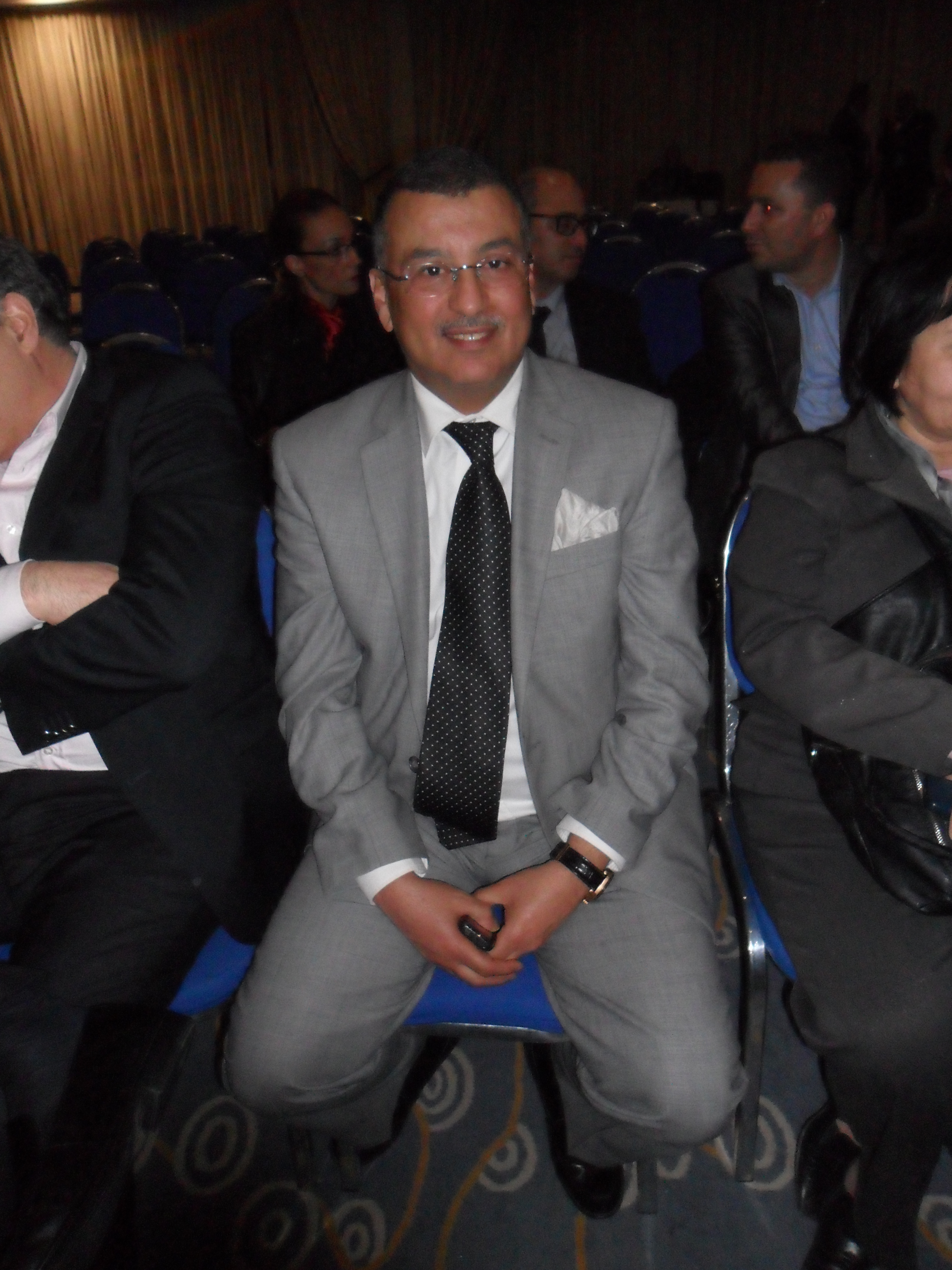
Abderrazak Kilani
Independent

== Protests ==
Following the assassination of Brahmi, protests continued in Tunisia by liberals. After weeks of such protests supporters of the incumbent Ennahda party rallied in Kasbah Square, where rallies had occurred during the Tunisian revolution, on 3 August following a call from the party. The protesters chanted "No to coups, yes to elections."

Ennahda National Constituent Assembly (NCA) member Nejib Mrad's statement on the following Tuesday on Mutawassit TV that an overthrow was under way took Tunisian national media by storm. Following Ennahda spokeswoman Yusra Ghannouchi telling Al Jazeera that the country did not want a repeat of "the Egyptian scenario," party MP Nejib Mrad released a statement on 13 August on Mutawassit TV stating the aforementioned. However, party Vice President Walid Bennani later said: "There's no coup d'etat in Tunisia. There’s an opposition party that wants to dissolve the government. The opposition also still wants to repeat the Egyptian scenario. That can't happen. There is no option [for an alternative to rise to] power. There's no resemblance between the two cases." Party leader Rachid Ghannouchi agreed to work with the Tunisian General Labour Union to find a compromise solution to the political impasse. He said that this was "a starting point for national dialogue;" however he rejected calls for Ali Laarayedh's government to resign saying that "the coalition government will not resign and will continue its duties until national dialogue reaches a consensus agreement that guarantees the completion of the democratic transition and the organisation of free and fair elections."

The UGTT's leader, Hussein Abbassi, announced that an agreement had been reached between the ruling and opposition parties for the incumbent Prime Minister to resign at the end of 2013 and allow for an interim government, a new constitution to be written and a new election held. Mehdi Jomaa was named the caretaker Prime Minister.

== Campaigning ==
The Ennada party has declined to officially endorse a presidential candidate. El Binaa El Watany, the Democratic Current, the Construction and Reform Party, Binaa Maghrebin, the National Movement for Justice and Development, and the Congress for the Republic announced support for Moncef Marzouki. The Afek Tounes party declared that it backs Beji Caid Essebsi for the presidency. The Al-Aman party endorsed Ahmed Nejib Chebbi's candidacy. Tounes Baytouna expressed support for Marzouki's campaign.

== Opinion polls ==
=== Before the campaign ===
| Poll source | Date(s) administered | Sample size | Undecided | Baccouche Nidaa | Ben Jafar Ettakatol | Chebbi PR | Essebsi Nidaa | Ghannouchi R. Ennahda | Hamdi Aridha | Hammami PT/FP | Jebali Ennahda | Laarayedh Ennahda | Marzouki CPR – Inc. | Saied Ind. | Jomaa Ind. | Morjane Initiative | Other |
|---|---|---|---|---|---|---|---|---|---|---|---|---|---|---|---|---|---|
| Emrhod | 3–12 Mar 2012 | 900 | 37.4% | | 3.8% | 2.5% | 2.8% | 6.2% | 2.3% | – | 6.2% | – | 20.9% | | | | 4.9% |
| 3C Etudes | Mar 2012 | ? | 35% | | 6.0% | – | 6.8% | 1.9% | – | – | 6.0% | – | 23% | | | | 19.3% |
| 3C Etudes | Apr 2012 | ? | 34% | | 6.4% | 2.0% | 9.4% | 2.4% | – | – | 5.0% | – | 20% | | | | 22.8% |
| 3C Etudes | May 2012 | ? | 38% | | 5.4% | 1.7% | 8.1% | 3% | – | – | 4.6% | – | 16% | | | | 23.2% |
| 3C Etudes | Jun 2012 | ? | 41.2% | | 4.7% | 1.3% | 8.5% | 1.9% | – | 2.1% | 5.8% | – | 13.3% | | | | 21.2% |
| Emrhod | 18–22 Jun 2012 | 960 | 21.9% | | 6.0% | 1.6% | 11.0% | 1.3% | 1.3% | – | 7.0% | – | 21.8% | | | | 28.1% |
| 3C Etudes | Oct 2012 | 1665 | 38% | | 3.3% | 0.9% | 14.0% | 1.1% | ? | – | 3.1% | – | 9.7% | | | | ? |
| 3C Etudes | Nov 2012 | 1648 | 42.1% | 2.5% | 3.6% | 1% | 10.9% | 1% | – | 2.1% | 2.3% | 1.3% | 7.2% | | | | ? |
| 3C Etudes | Dec 2012 | 1692 | 40.9% | 1.3% | 3.6% | 0.9% | 10.9% | 1.1% | – | 2.3% | 2.8% | 1.2% | 7% | | | | ? |
| Emrhod | Dec 2012 | 1200 | ? | 1.5% | 1.8% | ? | 12.2% | 3.4% | 2.1% | 5.0% | 3.6% | – | 8.9% | | | | ? |
| Sigma | Dec 2012 | 1892 | ? | 2.0% | 5.6% | 1.2% | 24.2% | 5.0% | ? | 9.2% | 13.9% | – | 12.1% | | | | ? |
| 3C Etudes | Jan 2013 | 1652 | 37.3% | ? | 2.5% | 1.5% | 9.9% | ? | ? | 3.8% | 2.6% | 0.8% | 7.1% | | | | ? |
| Sigma | Feb 2013 | 1616 | ? | 3.5% | 1.9% | 3.7% | 29.1% | 3.5% | ? | 12.0% | 21.7% | 7.3% | 4.6% | | | | ? |
| 3C Etudes | Feb 2013 | 1347 | 49.2% | ? | 1.6% | 1.2% | 6.8% | ? | ? | 4.0% | 6.0% | 1.0% | 5.0% | | | | ? |
| 3C Etudes | Mar 2013 | 1609 | 43% | 1.3% | 1.2% | 2.1% | 10.1% | ? | ? | 3.1% | 8.7% | 2.5% | 3.4% | | | | ? |
| Emrhod | Mar 2013 | 1200 | 21.1% (none); 8.3% (und.) | 1.9% | 1.0% | 3.1% | 20.7% | 1.9% | 1.8% | 8.0% | 12.5% | 5.9% | 1.3% | | | | 12.7% |
| 3C Etudes | Apr 2013 | 1695 | 44% | 2.5% | ? | ? | 10.1% | ? | ? | 3.9% | 6.4% | ? | 3.1% | | | | ? |
| Emrhod | Apr 2013 | 1022 | ? | 1.8% | ? | 2.0% | 20.8% | ? | ? | 4.1% | 8.2% | 2.3% | 2.0% | | | | ? |
| FSSA | Apr 2013 | 1210 | ? | 22.2% | 5.4% | 9.7% | ? | ? | ? | 17.0% | 27.1% | ? | 7.7% | | | | ? |
| 3C Etudes | May 2013 | 1678 | 35.8% | 1.6% | 1.5% | 2.6% | 16.2% | ? | ? | 2.9% | 6.4% | 2.1 | 2.3% | | | | ? |
| Emrhod | May 2013 | 1600 | ? | 0.9% | ? | 1.3% | 17.6% | ? | 1.4% | 4.5% | 3.3% | 2.9% | 1.3% | | | | ? |
| Istis | June 2013 | ? | ? | 4.1% | ? | 3.3% | 33.8% | ? | ? | ? | 19.8% | ? | 5.5% | | | | ? |
| Emrhod | June 2013 | 1067 | ? | 0.9% | ? | 1.3% | 17.7% | ? | 1.1% | 4.6% | 7.1% | 3.7% | 2.2% | | | | ? |
| 3C Etudes | July 2013 | 944 | 30% | 2.6% | 1.4% | 2.3% | 15.8% | ? | ? | 3.7% | 6.4% | 2.5% | 2.1% | | | | ? |
| Sigma | Aug 2013 | 1724 | 65% | ? | ? | 2.7% | 40.5% | 4.8% | ? | 7.3% | 8.6% | 6.3% | 7.0% | 4.0% | | | ? |
| 3C Etudes | Aug 2013 | 1249 | 34% | ? | ? | ? | 15.2% | ? | ? | 2.6% | 3.9% | 2.6% | 3.5% | 4.7% | | | ? |
| Emrhod | Sep 2013 | ? | ? | ? | ? | ? | 20.8% | ? | ? | 2.4% | 4.5% | 2.8% | 4.0% | 5.1% | | | ? |
| Sigma | Oct 2013 | ? | 49.6% | ? | ? | ? | 45.3% | 2–5% | ? | 9.5% | 6.3% | 4.8% | 7.0% | 2–5% | | | ? |
| 3C Etudes | Oct 2013 | 1318 | 35.5% | 1.7% | ? | ? | 14.3% | ? | ? | ? | 4.7% | ? | 3.3% | 4.7% | | | ? |
| Emrhod | Nov 2013 | 1900 | ? | ? | ? | ? | 14.7% | ? | ? | ? | 3.9% | ? | ? | ? | | | ? |
| 3C Etudes | Nov 2013 | 1658 | 38.6% | ? | ? | ? | 11.9% | ? | ? | 1.9% | 3.6% | ? | 4.0% | 4.9% | | | ? |
| Sigma | Dec 2013 | ? | nearly 65% | ? | ? | ? | 34.6% | ? | ? | 6.9% | 6.6% | ? | 7.1% | ? | | | ? |
| 3C Etudes | Dec 2013 | 1681 | 38.3% | ? | ? | ? | 11.2% | ? | ? | ? | 2.6% | 1.7% | 3.2% | 4.6% | | | ? |
| Emrhod | Jan 2014 | ? | ? | ? | ? | 1.0% | 13.3% | ? | ? | 2.6% | 4.8% | 2.5% | ? | 3.3% | | | ? |
| Sigma | Jan 2014 | 11362 | ? | 0.8% | 2.3% | 0.8% | 35.2% | 2.7% | ? | 3.7% | 6.1% | 7.8% | 7.8% | 3.9% | 14.8% | | ? |
| Emrhod | Feb 2014 | 1200 | ? | ? | ? | ? | 14.5% | ? | ? | 2.8% | 4.1% | 5.6% | ? | 3.4% | ? | | ? |
| Sigma | Feb 2014 | 1517 | ? | ? | 3.7% | 2.0% | 33.3% | ? | ? | 2.0% | 5.2% | 2.9% | 14.3% | 4.6% | 17.6% | | ? |
| Emrhod | Feb 2014 | 1051 | ? | ? | ? | ? | 19.3% | 3.9% | ? | 4.9% | 4.9% | 4.8% | 2.4% | 4.8% | ? | | ? |
| Sigma | Apr 2014 | 1636 | 55.4% | — | 3.0% | 2.2% | 31.6% | 1.1% | ? | 4.1% | 10.9% | 2.6% | 9.9% | 2.1% | 21.1% | | 11.3% |
| Sigma | May 2014 | ? | ? | — | ? | ? | 24.2% | ? | ? | ? | 5.7% | ? | 9.3% | ? | 30.1% | 5.3% | ? |
| Sigma | June 2014 | ? | ? | — | ? | ? | 29.9% | ? | ? | ? | 12.8% | ? | ? | ? | — | 8.3% | ? |
| Emrhod | Jun 2014 | ? | ? | — | ? | ? | 19.1% | ? | ? | ? | 3.7% | ? | 5.1% | ? | — | 3.5% | ? |
| Institut international des études des sondages | Jun 2014 | ? | ? | — | 3.2% | 1.4% | 23.2% | ? | 3.6 | 3.8% | 14.4% | 2.9% | 8.7% | 2.6% | — | ? | ? |
| Sigma | July 2014 | ? | ? | — | 3.2% | 5.1% | 29.8% | ? | 3.1% | 4.8% | 11.2% | ? | 9.9% | ? | — | 10.3% | ? |
| Source | Date | Sample size | Undecided | Baccouche | Ben Jafar | Chebbi | Essebsi | Ghannouchi | Hamdi | Hammami | Jebali | Laarayedh | Marzouki | Saied | Jomaa | Morjane | Other |

==== Runoff ====
| Candidates | 3C Etudes Jun 2012 | 3C Etudes Jul 2012 | 3C Etudes Apr 2013 | 3C Etudes May 2013 |
|---|---|---|---|---|
| Beji Caid Essebsi (Nidaa) | 38.8% | 39% | – | – |
| Moncef Marzouki (CPR) | 61.2% | 61% | – | – |
| Beji Caid Essebsi (Nidaa) | 90.4% | – | – | – |
| Zine el-Abidine Ben Ali (ex-RCD) | 9.6% | – | – | – |
| Hamma Hammami (PCOT) | 79.2% | – | – | – |
| Zine el-Abidine Ben Ali (ex-RCD) | 20.8% | – | – | – |
| Hamadi Jebali (Ennahda) | 51.4% | 46% | – | – |
| Moncef Marzouki (CPR) | 48.6% | 54% | – | – |
| Ahmed Najib Chebbi (Republican) | 22.5% | 22% | – | – |
| Moncef Marzouki (CPR) | 77.5% | 78% | – | – |
| Hamadi Jebali (Ennahda) | 74.9% | 73% | – | – |
| Ahmed Najib Chebbi (Republican) | 25.1% | 27% | – | – |
| Hamadi Jebali (Ennahda) | 58.2% | 61% | 50.6% | 48.8% |
| Beji Caid Essebsi (Nidaa) | 41.8% | 39% | 49.4% | 51.2% |

== Results ==
In the first round, Beji Caid Essebsi and Moncef Marzouki gained the most votes (39% and 33%, respectively), making it to the runoff. Hamma Hammami came in a distant third at 8%. Essebsi was the top candidate in most of the governorates in northern Tunisia, with Marzouki receiving the most votes in Tunisia's southern governorates. Hammami won a plurality of the votes in Siliana Governorate.

After the run-off polls closed on the night of 21 December 2014, Essebsi claimed victory on local television, and said that he dedicated his win to "the martyrs of Tunisia". The following day, results of the election showed that Essebsi beat his rival Moncef Marzouki by 55.68% of the vote, despite initial claims by Marzouki's spokesman that Essebsi's claim of victory was "without foundation". Marzouki himself said that Essebsi's claim was "undemocratic", but did not comment following the official results. However, his campaign's Facebook page congratulated Essebsi. The Associated Press said that the election was free and fair with 60% of voters participating, which was less than the first round's 70%.

In the capital Tunis, several hundred Essebsi supporters gathered around the Nidaa Tounes headquarters to celebrate his victory, waving national flags, singing and honking car horns. However, riots broke out in the southern city of El Hamma. Police used teargas to disperse many who came out to protest his victory because he was part of the old Ben Ali regime. The protesters were reported by Reuters to have burned tires while shops were closed, chanting "No to the old regime". Protesters also set fire to a Nidaa Tounes office in Tataouine.

| Candidate | Party | First round | | Second round | |
| Candidate | Party | Votes | % | Votes | % |
|---|---|---|---|---|---|
| Beji Caid Essebsi | Nidaa Tounes | 1,289,384 | 39.46 | 1,731,529 | 55.68 |
| Moncef Marzouki | Congress for the Republic | 1,092,418 | 33.43 | 1,378,513 | 44.32 |
| Hamma Hammami | Popular Front | 255,529 | 7.82 | | |
| Hechmi Hamdi | Current of Love | 187,923 | 5.75 | | |
| Slim Riahi | Free Patriotic Union | 181,407 | 5.55 | | |
| Kamel Morjane | National Destourian Initiative | 41,614 | 1.27 | | |
| Ahmed Néjib Chebbi | Republican Party | 34,025 | 1.04 | | |
| Safi Saïd | Independent | 26,073 | 0.80 | | |
| Mondher Zenaidi | Independent | 24,160 | 0.74 | | |
| Mustapha Ben Jaafar | Democratic Forum for Labour and Liberties | 21,989 | 0.67 | | |
| Kalthoum Kannou | Independent | 18,287 | 0.56 | | |
| Mohamed Frikha | Independent | 17,506 | 0.54 | | |
| Abderrazak Kilani | Independent | 10,077 | 0.31 | | |
| Mustapha Kamel Nabli (withdrew) | Independent | 6,723 | 0.21 | | |
| Abdelkader Labaoui | Independent | 6,486 | 0.20 | | |
| Larbi Nasra | Voice of the People of Tunisia | 6,426 | 0.20 | | |
| Hamouda Ben Slama | Independent | 5,737 | 0.18 | | |
| Mohamed Hamdi (withdrew) | Democratic Alliance Party | 5,593 | 0.17 | | |
| Mehrez Boussayene | Independent | 5,377 | 0.16 | | |
| Salem Chaïbi | Popular Congress Party | 5,245 | 0.16 | | |
| Samir Abdelli | Independent | 5,054 | 0.15 | | |
| Ali Chourabi | Independent | 4,699 | 0.14 | | |
| Mokhtar Mejri | Independent | 4,286 | 0.13 | | |
| Abderraouf Ayadi (withdrew) | Wafa Movement | 3,551 | 0.11 | | |
| Yassine Chennoufi | Independent | 3,118 | 0.10 | | |
| Abderrahim Zouari (withdrew) | Destourian Movement | 2,701 | 0.08 | | |
| Noureddine Hached (withdrew) | Independent | 2,181 | 0.07 | | |
| Total | | 3,267,569 | 100.00 | 3,110,042 | 100.00 |
| Valid votes | | 3,267,569 | 97.84 | 3,110,042 | 97.51 |
| Invalid/blank votes | | 72,097 | 2.16 | 79,340 | 2.49 |
| Total votes | | 3,339,666 | 100.00 | 3,189,382 | 100.00 |
| Registered voters/turnout | | 5,285,625 | 63.18 | 5,285,625 | 60.34 |
Source: Carter Center
