= Wafa Movement =

Tunisian political party

Wafa Movement حركة وفاء
- French name: Mouvement Wafa
- Secretary-General: Abderraouf Ayadi
- Founded: 2012
- Split from: Congress for the Republic (CPR)
- Ideology: Secularism; Pan-Arabism
- Political position: Centre-left to left-wing
- Assembly of the Representatives of the People: 0 / 217

Website
- facebook.com/mvt.wafa

The Wafa Movement (Arabic: حركة وفاء), sometimes referred to as the Independent Democratic Congress, is a political party in Tunisia.

The party was founded in 2012 by a number of constituents who broke away from the Congress for the Republic (CPR). Led by the short-time CPR secretary-general Abderraouf Ayadi, the party however remained loosely allied with the governing Troika coalition of Ennahda, CPR and Ettakatol.

Generally seen as a secular, left-leaning party, the Wafa Movement reached out to Islamists on the grounds of seeking unity among revolutionary forces. In the 2014 elections, the party lost its parliamentary representation.

== History ==
=== Formation ===
On 19 April 2012, CPR secretary-general Abderraouf Ayadi had been dismissed from his official functions following controversies over Ayadis approval of Samir Geageas right-wing Lebanese Forces, a Christian militia responsible for the Sabra and Shatila massacre of hundreds of Palestinian refugees in 1982.

A few days later, on 9 May 2012, Ayadi and a group of fellow constituents announced that they would leave the CPR to form a new party under the name of "Wafa", meaning "faithful", used here in the sense of "faithful to the revolution". On July 25, the party was officially founded, "with the sole objective of realizing the revolution’s objectives: work, liberty and national dignity."

=== Constituent Assembly ===
In November 2012, the party announced it would sue Israel for the 1988 assassination of Fatah-official Abu Jihad by Sayeret Matkal Colonel Nahum Lev in Tunis. Wafa attorney Fadira Najjar considered the assassination a war crime under international law and claimed that deposed Tunisian president Zine El-Abidine Ben Ali as well as security officials colluded with Israel.

In January 2013, secretary-general Ayadi supported the inscription of legal jihad into the Constitution of Tunisia. Allegedly he also advocated the integration of jihadist fighters into the Tunisian Army, which however was immediately demented by Wafa party officials. On 20 November 2013, Wafa president Abderraouf Ayadi proposed that a dialogue be started with militant Islamist group Ansar al-Sharia.

=== 2014 elections ===
Having started with 12 parliamentarians in 2012, the Wafa Movement went into the 2014 parliamentary election with 10 seats, all of which it lost receiving a mere 0.70% of the electoral vote. For the following presidential election, Wafa had already nominated its secretary-general Ayadi who however withdrew his candidacy after the electoral results were published calling the election a "soft coup" with the comeback of old regime figures. Wafa harshly criticized the candidacy of Beji Caid Essebsi, stating that he would have no place in a revolution of the youth against the former regime. The party later supported the electoral campaign of interim president Moncef Marzouki.
