= Othman al-Khamis =

Kuwaiti writer and religious scholar

Uthman al-Khamis
- عثمان الخميس
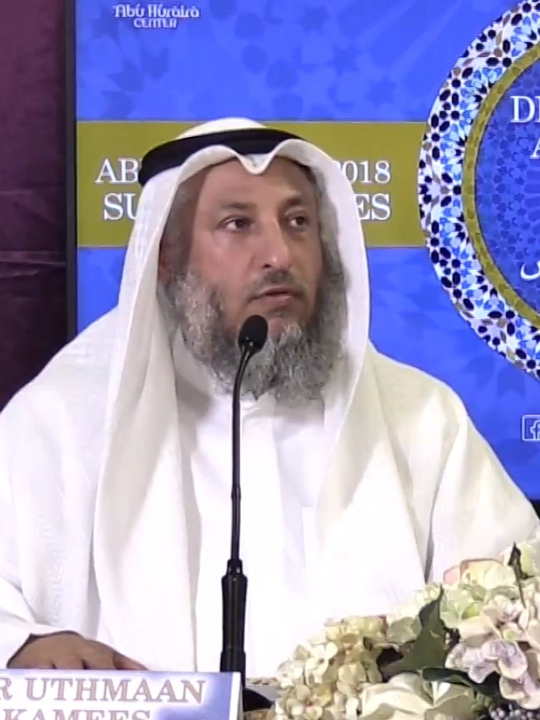

Head of Global Da'wah Council
- Incumbent
- Assumed office 1 March 2025
- Preceded by: Office established

Personal life
- Born: 26 May 1962 (age 64) Kuwait
- Education: Imam Mohammad Ibn Saud Islamic University

Religious life
- Religion: Islam
- Denomination: Sunni
- Jurisprudence: Hanbali
- Creed: Athari
- Movement: Salafism

Uthman bin Muhammad bin Hamad bin Abdullah bin Saleh bin Muhammad al-Khamis al-Nasiri al-Tamimi (Arabic: عثمان الخميس; born May 26, 1962), better known as Uthman al-Khamis, is a Kuwaiti Islamic scholar and the current head of the Global Da'wah Council.

== Scientific and practical career ==
Uthman al-Khamis studied at the Imam Muhammad ibn Saud Islamic University in Riyadh, holding a master's degree in the hadith (traditions of Muhammad), with a thesis on the hadiths contained in the matter of the two tribes (Al-Hasan and Al-Husayn). He holds a Ph.D. from King Saud University, with distinction, and his thesis entitled Reviews is a critical study. He worked as an imam in the Al-Hamidah Mosque from 1993 to approximately 2004, and before that, he was a muezzin in the same mosque from 1989 to 1993. He is part of The Global Daw'ah Council and, holds question and answer programs on television shows and social media, where he receives questions from the public and answers them live. Most of the questions are related to Islamic social life.

Al-Khamis was a debater of Sunni Muslims against Shia Islam, as he criticized classical (including al-Kulaini author of the most prominent Shia hadith collection) and modern (including al-Khomeini) Shiite scholars and their views in many of their beliefs.

He is known through his books, research and responses to the Twelver Shiites as well, through many satellite and dialogue programs that discuss issues of differences between Islamic sects.

In the late 1990s he hosted a show on the Al Mustakillah television channel that broadcasts from London, which was hosting many of the Shiite clerics, to theorize the repercussions of the sedition of Uthman's murder and the issues of Ali and the awaited Mahdi state. Al-Khamees also participated in many debates between the Twelver Shiites and Sunni Muslims on satellite television stations.

== Personal life ==
He married in 1987, and has four children. He belongs to the Arab Banu Tamim tribe.

== Reception ==
In 2023, he was subjected to an entry ban for two years by Denmark. He was also previously banned from the Netherlands.
