= Abderraouf Ayadi =

Tunisian politician

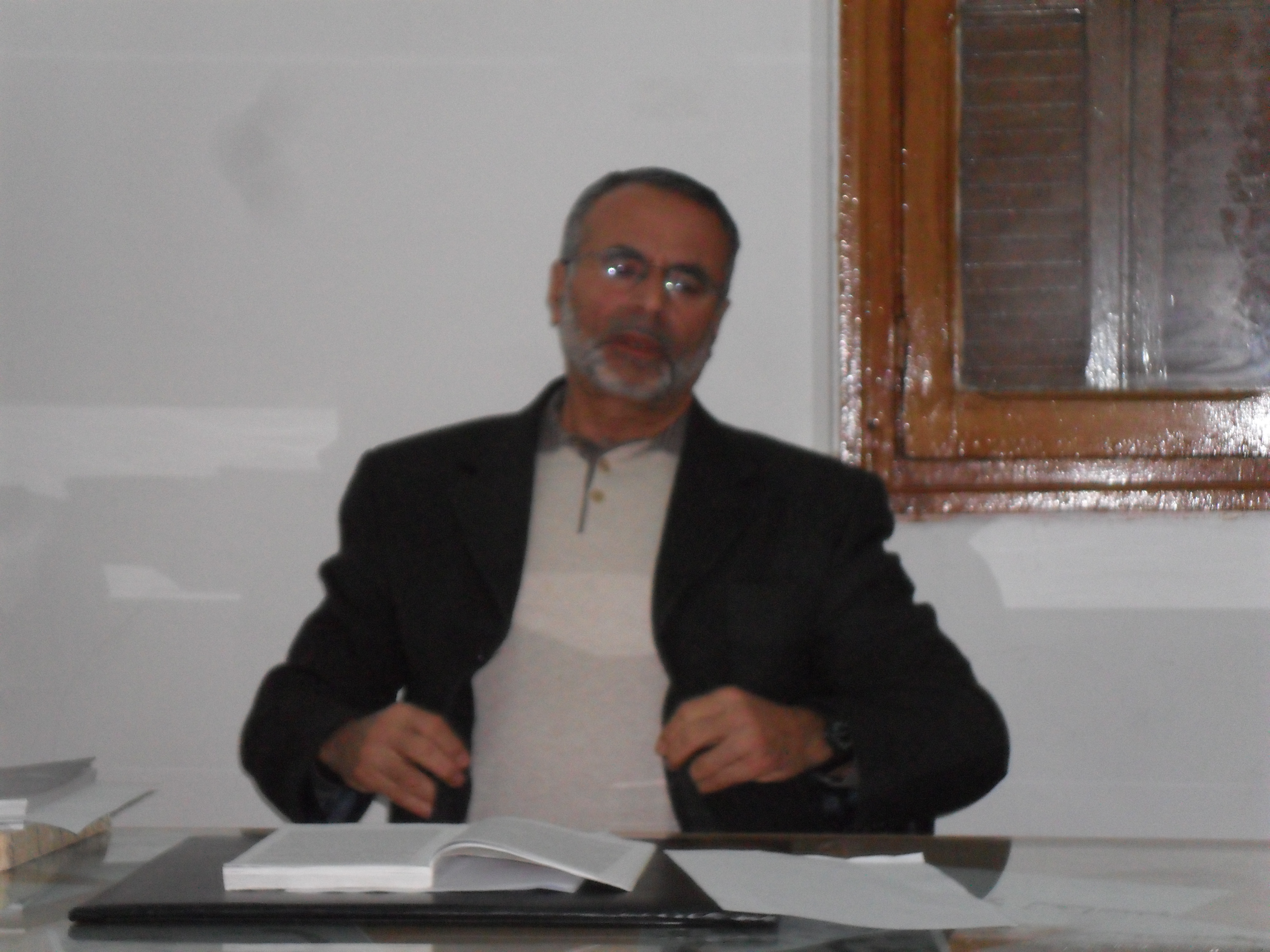

President of the Wafa Movement
- Incumbent
- Assumed office 25 July 2012

Member of the Constituent Assembly
- In office 22 November 2011 – 2 December 2014
- Constituency: Manouba

Interim Secretary-General of the Congress for the Republic
- In office 13 December 2011 – 19 April 2012
- Preceded by: Moncef Marzouki
- Succeeded by: Haythem Belgacem

Personal details
- Born: 12 February 1950 (age 76) Manouba, Tunisia
- Party: Wafa Movement (May 2012 - present); Congress for the Republic (July 2001 - May 2012)
- Profession: Lawyer

Abderraouf Ayadi (Tunisian Arabic: عبد الرؤوف العيادي; born 12 February 1950 in Manouba, Tunisia) is a Tunisian human rights activist, politician and lawyer.

After the Tunisian Revolution in 2011, he was elected as a member of the Constituent Assembly. Temporarily serving as secretary-general of his longtime party Congress for the Republic (CPR), in 2012 he went into opposition, founding the Wafa Movement, which he leads as president.

== Activism ==
As an activist for human rights, Ayadi spent six and a half years in prison, five and a half in the wake of the process against the left-wing movement El Amal Ettounsi in 1974. After his release from prison, Ayadi continued to be interrogated frequently, living under constant surveillance from the regime of Zine el-Abidine Ben Ali. On 24 July 2001, Ayadi co-founded the Congress of the Republic (CPR) and was elected its vice-president. Ayadi participated in a 32-day hunger strike against Ben Ali's regime on 18 October 2005, the protesters then formed the 18 October Coalition for Rights and Freedoms.

== Political career ==
After the Tunisian Revolution, he was named by his party, the Congress of the Republic (CPR), as its representative at the Higher Authority for Realisation of the Objectives of the Revolution, Political Reform and Democratic Transition In the 2011 Constituent Assembly election, Ayadi was elected to represent the district of La Manouba in the Constituent Assembly of Tunisia.

After the election of CPR Secretary-General Moncef Marzouki as President of Tunisia, Ayadi moved up as leader of the CPR. His nomination was however disputed by some party members and the name of Tahar Hmila was shortly brought up. Finally, on 20 December 2011, the party officially named Ayadi the CPR's interim Secretary General, to be confirmed at the party's next congress, which however had to be delayed until June 2012.

Following allegations that he had taken "positions contrary to the principles of the party and its decisions, without consultation with the political bureau", Ayadi on 19 April 2012 was dismissed from his official functions. Ayadi had lauded Samir Geagea's right-wing Lebanese Forces, whose Christian militia was responsible for the Sabra and Shatila massacre of hundreds of Palestinian refugees in 1982. Haythem Belgacem temporarily replaced Ayadi as secretary general of the CPR.

Only a few days later, on 9 May 2012, Ayadi and a group of fellow partisans and members of the Constituent Assembly announced that they would leave the CPR and form a new party under the name of "Wafa" (meaning "faithful", used here in the sense of "faithful to the revolution"). On 25 July, the Wafa Movement was officially founded.

In late June 2014, Ayadi was one of the first to announce his candidacy for the 2014 presidential election. In the 2014 parliamentary election, his new party however lost all its seats. On 19 December 2014 he however withdrew.

== Positions ==
On 25 February 2012, Ayadi declared on Tunisian TV that the first President of Tunisia, Habib Bourguiba, had been "hostile to Arab culture and Islam".

When in March 2012, the preamble of the new Tunisian Constitution was discussed, Ayadi supported Ennahda's proposal to keep intact Article 1 of the 1959 constitution describing the country as a republic with Arabic being its language and Islam its religion. Ayadi said: "As long as the identity of the country is Arab-Muslim, the article remains accurate and relevant." The decision could potentially prevent the abuse of religion for political gains, he said: "Prophet Mohammed used politics for religion. Now we are afraid that some will use religion for politics – especially when the goals aren't always clear."

In May 2012, he declared that he would "respect and love" Adolf Hitler who had never done anything against the Arabs. He claimed that the situation for Tunisia had even improved with the German invasion during the Second World War.

In January 2013, Ayadi supported the inscription of legal jihad into the Constitution of Tunisia, allegedly advocating the integration of jihadist fighters into the Tunisian Army. This information was disclaimed by Wafa party officials on the next day.

After the murder of left-wing leader Chokri Belaid, one of Ayadi's allies during the times as activists, on 6 February 2013, Prime Minister Hamadi Jebali from the Islamist Ennahda party announced on 12 February that he would form a government of "national unity" which would consist of "apolitical technocrats". Abderraouf Ayadi's Wafa party immediately criticized this proposal and stressed that a government which remains true to the values of the revolution should remain "political in nature".

On 20 November 2013 he proposed that a dialogue be started with the outlawed Islamist terror group Ansar al-Sharia.
