= Abderrazak Kilani =

Tunisian politician and lawyer

- عبد الرزاق الكيلاني
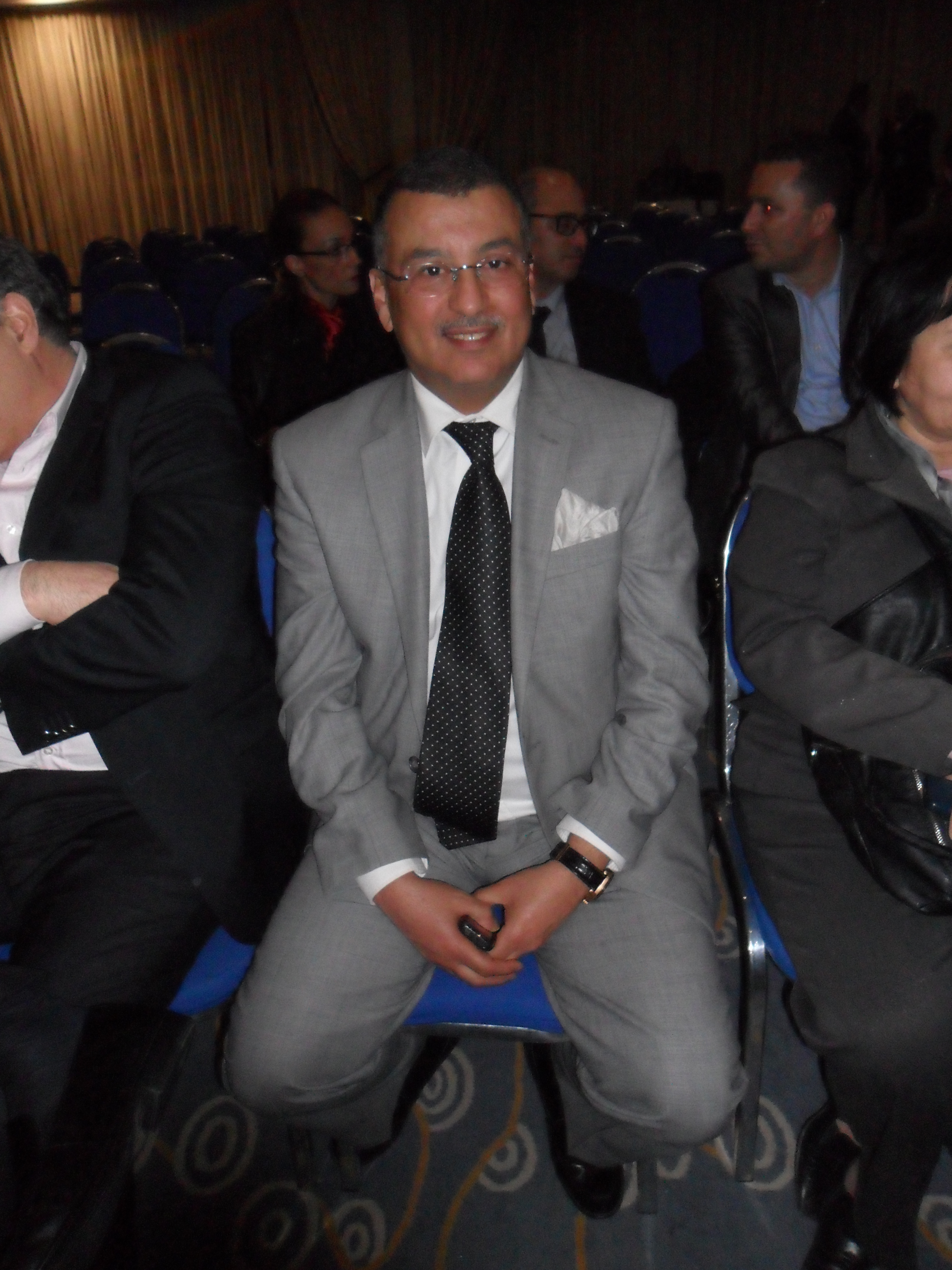

Ambassador of Tunisia to the United Nations
- Incumbent
- Assumed office 2013

Deputy Prime Minister for Relations With the Constituent Assembly
- In office 24 December 2011 – 13 March 2013
- President: Moncef Marzouki
- Prime Minister: Hamadi Jebali

Personal details
- Born: 25 June 1954 (age 72) Tunis, Tunisia
- Party: independent
- Children: 3
- Education: University of Lyon
- Occupation: Lawyer

Abderrazak Kilani (Tunisian Arabic: عبد الرزاق الكيلاني; born 25 June 1954) is a Tunisian politician and lawyer. In 2010 and during the Tunisian Revolution, he was the chairman of the National Bar of Lawyers In 2012, he served as the Deputy Prime Minister for Relations with the Constituent Assembly under Prime Minister Hamadi Jebali. Since 2013, he has been Ambassador of Tunisia to the United Nations. In October 20, 2020, Prime Minister Hichem Mechichi appointed Abderrazak Kilani as President of the General Authority of Resisters, Martyrs and Wounded of the Revolution and Terrorist Operations.

== Early life ==
Abderazzak Kilani was born on June 25, 1954, in Tunis. His primary and secondary education was spent in Tunis, he subsequently moved to France to continue his university studies in Grenoble and Lyon from 1973 until 1979.

Kilani got a master's degree from Grenoble University in private and judicial law in 1978, he received his graduate certificate specializing in insurance law from the University of Lyon in 1979.

== Lawyer ==
He was known for his human rights activism nationally and internationally when he was elected Deputy President of the Tunisian Association of Young Lawyers for a term between 1988 and 1989, he subsequently became the organization's President between 1990 and 1991.

In 1992, he established the Maghreb Union of Young Lawyers and then he was the Co-founder and General Secretary of the Tunisia Center for Lawyers Autonomy. He was also a coordinator of the Defense Committee for Mohamed Abbou. He was a member of the National Committee for the Promotion of Human Rights. As a law professor, over a six-year period he gave more than 400 law lectures on different cases in Tunisian Law.

As a lawyer he was also very involved in Tunisian sports. He was a former member of the Tunisian Confederation of Tennis, and a member of the administration of the Espérance Sportive de Tunis football team. He played for Espérance Sportive de Tunis between 1967 and 1973. He was an early founder of the football club of lawyers.

In 2010 and during the Tunisian Revolution, he was the chairman of the National Bar of Lawyers after a democratic election.

== Politician ==
On 20 December 2011, after former President Zine El Abidine Ben Ali was deposed, he joined the Jebali Cabinet as Deputy Prime Minister for Relations With the Constituent Assembly.

Since 2013, he is the permanent Ambassador of Tunisia to the United Nations at Geneva.

== Personal life ==
Kilani is married, and has three children involved in tennis.
