= Current of Love =

Tunisian political movement

Current of Love تيار المحبة
- French name: Courant de l'amour
- Leader: Mohamed Hechmi Hamdi
- Founded: 17 March 2011; 15 years ago
- Ideology: Populism; Islamic democracy Social conservatism Regionalism
- Colors: brown, red
- Assembly of the Representatives of the People: 0 / 217

Website
- facebook.com/Mahabba.Officiel

The Current of Love or Tayar el-Mahaba (Tunisian Arabic: تيار المحبة, French: Courant de l'amour), before May 2013 known as the Popular Petition for Freedom, Justice and Development (Tunisian Arabic: العريضة الشعبية للحرية والعدالة والتنمية, el-‘Arīḍah esh-Sha‘biya Lil-Ḥuriya Wel-‘Adāla Wet-Tanmiya, French: Pétition populaire pour la liberté, la justice et le développement), short Popular Petition, Aridha Chaabia or Al Aridha, is a political movement and electoral list in Tunisia. It was formed after the Tunisian revolution, on 17 March 2011. It has been founded and led by the political writer and media entrepreneur Mohamed Hechmi Hamdi. It is closely linked to the Party of Progressive Conservatives, which has been officially registered as a political party.

== Platform and campaign ==
Hechmi Hamdi, who is the owner of Al Mustakilla satellite TV channel, is alleged to have close ties with Tunisia's ousted president Ben Ali, but decries such allegations as slander. In the campaign ahead of the Constituent Assembly election on 23 October 2011, the party has promised free health care, and an allowance of 200 dinars for each of the 500,000 jobseekers in Tunisia. Hechmi Hamdi personally has pledged to inject 2 billion dinars of his own wealth into the national budget. Al-Mustakilla channel has fiercely supported the Petition's campaign. Therefore, numerous complaints against Aridha Chaabia have been filed with the electoral commission ISIE, asking for an annulment of the list and its seats.

== 2011 election ==
To the surprise of both rivals and neutral observers, the party performed well, winning 27 seats in the Constituent Assembly. The unexpected success was said to be due to the Southerner Hechmi Hamdi's appeal in the southern and central governorates, given that representatives from Tunis and the Mediterranean coast have so far dominated Tunisian politics.

On 27 October, ISIE disqualified the Petition's lists in six constituencies (with altogether eight elected candidates) for financial irregularities. Thus, the number of seats was brought down to 19, still making Al Aridha the fourth largest in the convention. ISIE's decision to cancel seats triggered violent protests of Popular Petition supporters in Sidi Bouzid. Party leader Hechmi Hamdi asked his successful candidates to resign and boycott the Constituent Assembly, before reversing this decision on 28 October when he announced that the list's representatives would work in the parliamentary opposition. Following Popular Petition's complaint before the Administrative Court, the electoral commission's decision was mostly revoked: seven of the cancelled seats were reinstated by the judge's verdict, giving the populist party 26 seats altogether. However, twelve of its parliament members resigned from the party in the following days and declared themselves independent.

== Party of Progressive Conservatives ==
The Popular Petition for Freedom, Justice and Development is organised as a popular movement and an electoral list, but is not registered as a political party. It is however closely linked to the Party of Progressive Conservatives (PPC), which was officially licensed on 15 July 2011 and is part of an initiative started by the Popular Petition. The Popular Petition and the PPC have "exactly the same program", according to Hechmi Hamdi who leads Aridha Chaabia and PPC in personal union.

== Renaming ==
In May 2013, Hechmi Hamdi relaunched the movement under the new name of Tayar al-Mahaba, or "Current of Love".

== Election results ==
Election year	# of total votes	% of overall vote	# of seats
Constituent Assembly of Tunisia
2011	273,362	6.74%	26 / 217
Assembly of the Representatives of the People
2014	40,826	1.20%	2 / 217
2019	17,749	0.62%	1 / 217
