= Voice of the People of Tunisia =

Tunisian political party

Voice of the People of Tunisia صوت شعب تونس
- French name: Voix du peuple tunisien
- Founder: Larbi Nasra
- Founded: June 2014
- Assembly of the Representatives of the People: 0 / 217

Website
- facebook.com/vpt.tn

The Voice of the People of Tunisia (Arabic: صوت شعب تونس Ṣawt Sha‘b Tūnis; French: La voix du peuple tunisien) is a Tunisian political party, founded in June 2014 by Larbi Nasra, a media entrepreneur, founder and former owner of Hannibal TV station and in-law of former President Zine El Abidine Ben Ali. The name is a reference to the advertising slogan of Nasra's TV station. The party's six members in the Constituent Assembly had defected from other parties. Larbi Nasra was the party's candidate in the 2014 presidential election.
