= Sami Hamdi =

British journalist (born 1990)

- Born: July 1990 (age 36); London Borough of Lambeth, England
- Education: School of Oriental and African Studies (SOAS) (Bachelor's and Master's)
- Occupations: Journalist, Geopolitical Analyst
- Spouse: Soumaya Hamdi
- Children: 3
- Father: Mohamed Hechmi Hamdi

Sami Hamdi (born in July 1990) is a British journalist, political commentator, and risk‑intelligence advisor.

== Early life and education ==
Hamdi is the son of Tunisian activist Mohamed Hechmi Hamdi. Mr. Hamdi originally wanted to pursue a career in football, but around the age of 17–18, his father gave him a copy of The Road to Mecca, which redirected his aspirations. He holds a Bachelor's and Master's degree in Law from the School of Oriental and African Studies (SOAS) University of London, with the intention of going into politics, though he later pivoted towards risk analysis.

== Career ==
Hamdi serves as the Managing Director and Editor‑in‑Chief of The International Interest, described as a global risk and intelligence consultancy/analysis firm focused on geopolitical dynamics, especially in Europe and the MENA region. He is a frequent media commentator, featuring on media outlets including Al Jazeera (both English and Arabic), BBC, Sky News, LBC and TRT World, offering geopolitical analysis of the Middle East.

In June 2025, he toured throughout South Africa.

== Detention in the United States ==
On 26 October 2025, Hamdi was detained by the U.S. Immigration and Customs Enforcement (ICE) at San Francisco International Airport while on a speaking tour in the United States. His U.S. visa was revoked the day before his detention.

A spokesperson for the US Department of Homeland Security, a parent agency of ICE, accused Hamdi of "supporting terrorism" and said that "This individual's visa was revoked, and he is in ICE custody pending removal". The spokesperson cited a report by RAIR Foundation, described by the Southern Poverty Law Center as an anti-Muslim hate group. Far-right conspiracy theorist Laura Loomer claimed credit for the detention.

=== Release from custody ===
After an immigration hearing on 10 November 2025, Hamdi was set to be released. Hussam Ayloush, CEO of CAIR's California chapter, said that: "His only real 'offence' was speaking clearly about Israel's genocidal war crimes against Palestinians." On 11 November 2025, he agreed to voluntarily leave the United States.

=== Reactions ===
The detention was widely condemned by civil rights groups and journalist groups.

- The Council on American-Islamic Relations (CAIR) described it as an "injustice" and an "abduction", and claimed that it was for his outspoken criticism of Israel and the genocide that it is committing. They also described move as an "Israel First policy" as opposed to America First.
- The National Union of Journalists (NUJ), a British and Irish journalists' trade union, and the International Federation of Journalists (IFJ), an international journalists' trade union, expressed concern that anti-terror legislation was being weaponised to curb freedom of speech, and called for his immediate release.
- Hamdi's wife, Soumaya Hamdi, also described it as an abduction, and that the he suffered a medical emergency while in custody and was experienced delays in treatment. She also claimed that "it's only a matter of time before they start to treat US citizens like that too".
- Five members of the British parliament, including Jeremy Corbyn, called for the British government to facilitate his return. The Muslim Council of Britain stated that press freedom cannot be selective.

== Political views ==
Hamdi is noted for being an outspoken critic of Israel's military action in Gaza, including describing the conflict in Gaza as genocide and criticising Western governments' policies in the region.

== Personal life ==
Hamdi is a Muslim, married to Soumaya Hamdi and a father of three. He is of Tunisian and Algerian descent.
