= Mohamed Hechmi Hamdi =

Tunisian journalist and politician (born 1964)

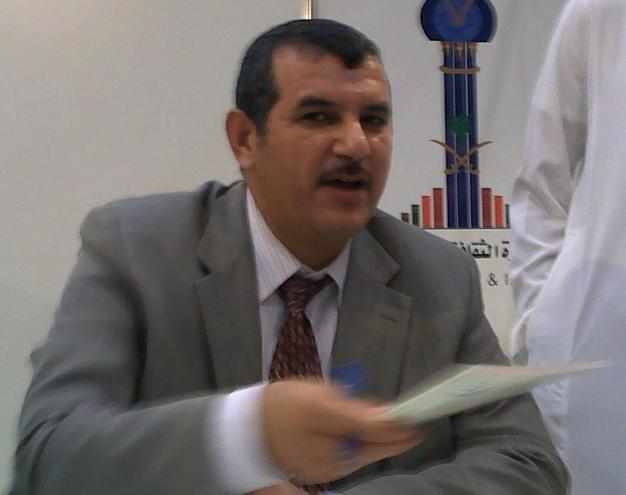
- Born: 28 March 1964 (age 62); Sidi Bouzid, Tunisia
- Occupations: Journalist, businessman
- Political party: Current of Love, Party of Progressive Conservatives
- Children: Sami Hamdi

Mohamed Hechmi Hamdi (Arabic: محمد الهاشمي الحامدي; born 28 March 1964), also spelled Mohamed el Hachmi El-Hamdi, Hechmi Haamdi, or Hachmi Hamdi is a Tunisian journalist, media entrepreneur and politician, who lives in London. He is founder and owner of the opposition Al Mustakillah TV channel. After the Tunisian Revolution in 2011 he founded the "Popular Petition" party later renamed to Current of Love.

== Personal life ==
Mohamed Hechmi Hamdi was born in Sidi Bouzid. In 1985, he obtained a B.A. in Arabic language and literature from Tunis University. In 1990, he gained a M.A. in Arab literature and history from the University of London. In 1996, he obtained his D.Phil in contemporary Islamic studies from SOAS, University of London.

== Career ==
After contributing articles to different newspapers and journals, including the London-based Arabic daily Asharq Al-Awsat, he founded his own weekly Al-Mustakilla ("The Independent") in 1993, the quarterly magazine "The Diplomat" in 1996, Al Mustakillah satellite TV channel in 1999, and a second TV channel, called "Democracy", in 2005.

From the early 1980s until his resignation in 1992, Hechmi Hamdi was a member of the Tunisian Islamist Ennahda Movement. Later, he was alleged, but denied, to have developed close ties to President Zine El Abidine Ben Ali and his party, RCD.

In March 2011, after the Tunisian revolution, he founded the Popular Petition for Freedom, Justice and Development (Aridha Chaabia), which he promoted from his Al-Mustakilla TV channel and announced his candidature for the presidential elections. On 4 February 2012 Hechmi Hamdi was elected secretary general of the Party of Progressive Conservatives (PPC), which is closely linked to the Popular Petition movement. In May 2013 Hechmi Hamdi relaunched his Aridha movement under the new name of Tayar al-Mahaba, or Current of Love.
