= Congress for the Republic =

Tunisian political party

Congress for the Republic المؤتمر من أجل الجمهورية
- French name: Congrès pour la République
- Abbreviation: El Mottamar, CPR
- President: Samir Ben Amor
- Founder: Moncef Marzouki and 31 others
- Founded: 25 July 2001; 24 years ago; 11 September 2017; 8 years ago (refoundation)
- Merged into: Al-Irada
- Headquarters: 41 Hedi Chaker, 1000 Tunis
- Newspaper: Tunisie Avenir (in French)
- Ideology: Secularism; Factions: Left-wing nationalism Social democracy Democratic socialism Social liberalism Progressivism
- Political position: Centre-left to left-wing
- International affiliation: Socialist International; Humanists International; Progressive Alliance
- Colors: Green and red
- Slogan: Sovereignty of the people, dignity of the citizen, legitimacy of the state. Tunisian Arabic: السيادة للشعب، الكرامة للمواطن، الشرعية للدولة; French: La souveraineté du peuple, la dignité du citoyen, la légitimité de l'état.
- Assembly of the Representatives of the People: 0 / 217

Election symbol

The Congress for the Republic (Arabic: المؤتمر من أجل الجمهورية, romanized: Al-Mu’tamar min ajl al-Jumhūriyya; French: Congrès pour la République), also referred to as El Mottamar or by its French acronym CPR, is a centre-left political party in Tunisia. It was created in 2001, but legalised only after the 2011 Tunisian revolution. Its most prominent founder and long-term leader was Moncef Marzouki. He had been the party's honorary president since he became interim president of Tunisia in December 2011.

== History ==
=== Foundation ===
The creation of the CPR was declared on 25 July 2001 by 31 people including the physician, medicine professor and human rights activist Moncef Marzouki as President, Naziha Réjiba (Oum Ziad) as Secretary-general, Abderraouf Ayadi as Vice-President, Samir Ben Amor as Treasurer, and Mohamed Chakroun as Honorary President. The CPR declared that it was aimed to install a republican form of government "for the first time"in Tunisia, including freedom of speech, freedom of association, and the holding of "free, honest" elections, "guaranteed by national and international observers able to genuinely check all levels of the electoral process". The CPR's declaration also called for a new constitution, strict separation of the different branches of government, human rights guarantees, gender equality, and a constitutional court for protecting individual and collective rights. The CPR called for renegotiating Tunisian commitments toward the European Union, for Tunisia to support the rights of national self-determination, in particular for the Palestinian people.

It was ideologically heterogeneous, including social democrats, Arab nationalists, far-leftists, as well as Islamists. The unifying point was their firm opposition to the regime of President Zine El Abidine Ben Ali.

=== 2001–2010 ===
In 2002, during the Ben Ali presidency, the CPR was banned. Its leader Marzouki went into exile in Paris. However, the party continued a de facto existence, being run from France until 2011.

=== 2011 ===
Following the ouster of President Ben Ali in January 2011 as a result of the 2010–2011 Tunisian protests, CPR President Moncef Marzouki announced that he would return to Tunisia and be a candidate in the next general election. He returned to Tunisia on 18 January 2011.

The CPR's electoral symbol.

The Congress for the Republic's electoral symbol is a red pair of glasses, alluding to Moncef Marzouki's characteristic glasses. Young supporters of the CPR are known to wear red glasses as an accessory to show their support for Marzouki.

In the election for a constituent assembly, the CPR won 8.7% of the popular vote and 29 of 217 seats in the National Constituent Assembly, making it the second-strongest party. Subsequently, the party contracted a three-party coalition with the winning Islamist Ennahda Movement and Ettakatol, called the "Troika". Accordingly, the Constituent Assembly elected CPR leader Moncef Marzouki interim President of Tunisia on 12 December 2011. Thereupon Marzouki appointed an Ennahda-led government with participation of the CPR. Abderraouf Ayadi succeeded Marzouki as secretary-general of the CPR.

=== 2012 ===
In May 2012, disaffected members of the CPR left the party and formed the Independent Democratic Congress. The splinter party that was later renamed Wafa Movement, is headed by Abderraouf Ayadi, a former secretary general of the CPR. He was joined by 12 members of the Constituent Assembly.

== Party officials ==
- Moncef Marzouki, CPR Honorary President and President of the Republic of Tunisia

Secretary General

- Imed Daimi, MP (Medenine), former Chief of Staff of the President of the Republic Moncef Marzouki and former MP (Representing diaspora in France - Northern district) at the National Constituent Assembly

Spokesperson (also members of political bureau) :

- Ikbal Msadaa, Spokesperson, Former MP (Arab World, Africa and the rest of the world) at the National Constituent Assembly
- Haythem Belgacem, Spokesperson, Former MP (Ben Arous) and President of CPR parliament group at the National Constituent Assembly

Members of political bureau :

- Noura Ben Hassen, Former MP (Representing diaspora in France - Southern district) at the National Constituent Assembly
- Selim Ben Hmidane, Former minister of State domains and former MP (Medenine) at the National Constituent Assembly
- Ibrahim Ben Said, MP (Kebili)
- Amor Chetoui, Former MP (Kebili) at the National Constituent Assembly and President of the constitutional committee in charge of drafting the power distribution rules in the new Tunisian constitution.
- Sabri Dekhil, MP (Gabes)
- Mabrouk Hrizi, MP (Kasserine), Former MP (Kasserine) at the National Constituent Assembly and second vice rapporteur of the constitution.
- Tarek Kahlaoui, Former Director of the Tunisian Institute for Strategic Studies
- Adnan Mansar, Former Chief of Staff of the President of the Republic Moncef Marzouki
- Mabrouka M'Barek, Former MP (Representing diaspora in the Americas and rest of Europe) at the National Constituent Assembly
- Bechir Nefzi, Former MP (Representing diaspora in France - Northern district) at the National Constituent Assembly
- Khaled Traoui

President of CPR National Council

- Habib Bouajila

Treasurer: Samir Ben Amor

== Election results ==
| Election year | # of total votes | % of overall vote | # of seats |
Constituent Assembly of Tunisia
| 2011 | 353,041 | 8.71% | 29 / 217 |
Assembly of the Representatives of the People
| 2014 | 72,942 | 2.14% | 4 / 217 |
| 2019 | 8,869 | 0.31% | 0 / 217 |
