= Moncef Marzouki =

President of Tunisia from 2011 to 2014

His Excellency Moncef Marzouki
- المنصف المرزوقي
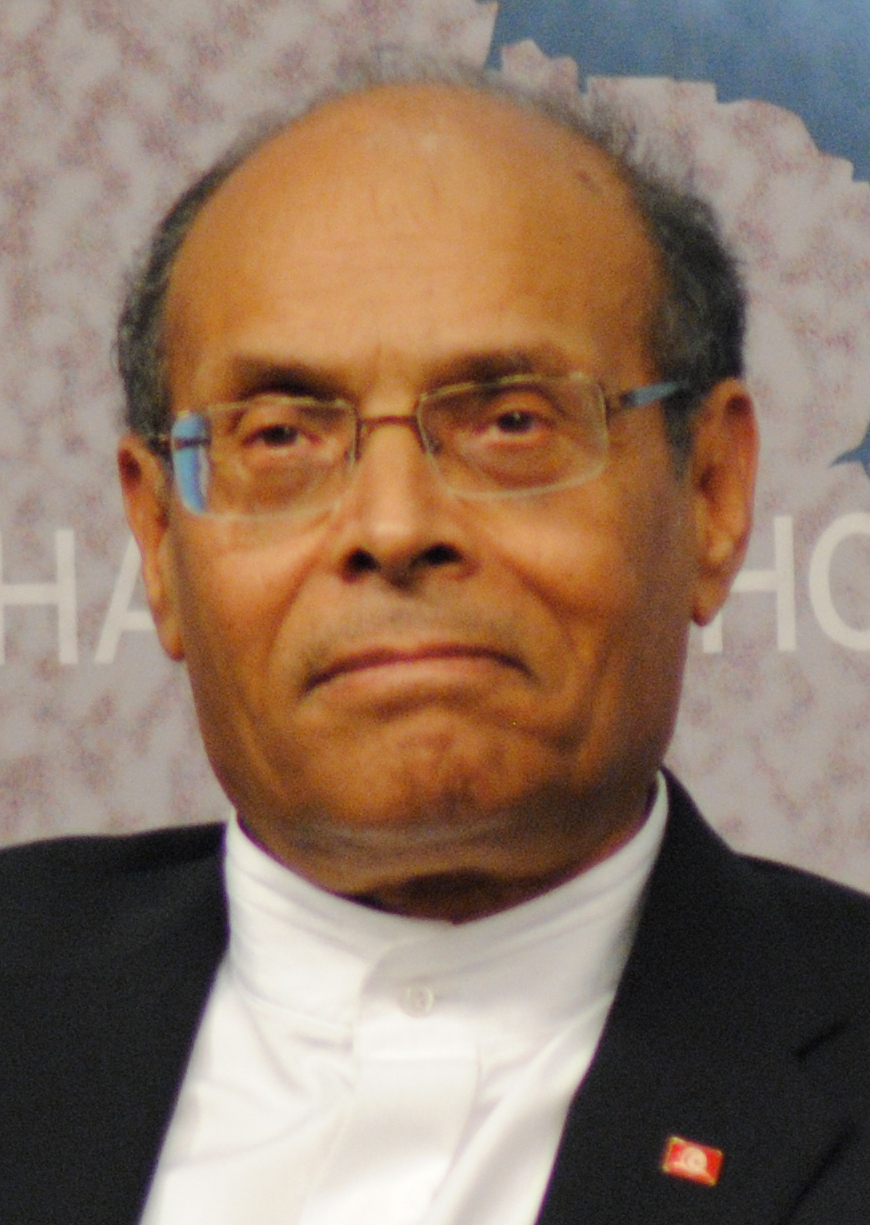
- Marzouki in 2013

3rd President of Tunisia
- In office 13 December 2011 – 31 December 2014
- Prime Minister: Beji Caid Essebsi; Hamadi Jebali; Ali Laarayedh; Mehdi Jomaa
- Preceded by: Fouad Mebazaa (acting)
- Succeeded by: Beji Caid Essebsi

Member of the Constituent Assembly for Nabeul's 2nd district
- In office 22 November 2011 – 13 December 2011
- Preceded by: Constituency established
- Succeeded by: Samia Abbou

President of the Congress for the Republic
- In office 24 July 2001 – 13 December 2011
- Preceded by: Position established
- Succeeded by: Abderraouf Ayadi (acting)

President of the Tunisian Human Rights League
- In office 12 March 1989 – 5 February 1994
- Preceded by: Mohamed Charfi
- Succeeded by: Taoufik Bouderbala

Personal details
- Born: 7 July 1945 (age 81) Grombalia, French Tunisia
- Party: Al-Irada
- Other political affiliations: Congress for the Republic (until 2015)
- Spouse: Beatrix Rhein
- Children: 2
- Education: University of Strasbourg
- Website: Official website

Mohamed Moncef Marzouki (Arabic: محمد المنصف المرزوقي; Muhammad al-Munṣif al-Marzūqī, born 7 July 1945) is a Tunisian politician who served as the third president of Tunisia from 2011 to 2014. Through his career he has been a human rights activist, physician and politician. On 12 December 2011, he was elected president of Tunisia by the Constituent Assembly.

== Early life ==
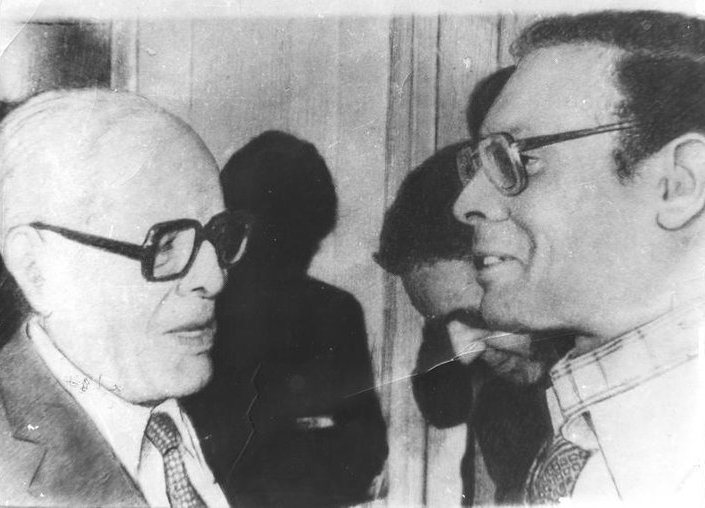
Marzouki with Habib Bourguiba in 1982.

Born in Grombalia, Tunisia, Marzouki was the son of a Qadi. His father, being a supporter of Salah Ben Youssef (Bourguiba's opponent), emigrated to Morocco in the late 1950s because of political pressures. Marzouki finished his secondary education in Tangier, where he obtained the Baccalauréat in 1961. He then went to study medicine at the University of Strasbourg in France. Returning to Tunisia in 1979, he founded the Center for Community Medicine in Sousse and the African Network for Prevention of Child Abuse, also joining Tunisian League for Human Rights. In his youth, he had travelled to India to study Mahatma Gandhi's non-violent resistance. Later, he also travelled to South Africa to study its transition from apartheid.

== Political career ==
When the government cracked down violently on the Islamist Ennahda Movement in 1991, Marzouki confronted Tunisian President Ben Ali calling on him to adhere to the law. In 1993, Marzouki was a founding member of the National Committee for the Defense of Prisoners of Conscience, but he resigned after it was taken over by supporters of the government. He was arrested on several occasions on charges relating to the propagation of false news and working with banned Islamist groups. He subsequently founded the National Committee for Liberties. He became President of the Arab Commission for Human Rights and as of 17 January 2011 continues as a member of its executive board.

In 2001, he founded the Congress for the Republic. This political party was banned in 2002, but Marzouki moved to France and continued running it.

Following President Zine El Abidine Ben Ali's departure from Tunisia and the Tunisian revolution, Marzouki announced his return to Tunisia and his intention to run for the presidency.

=== President of Tunisia ===
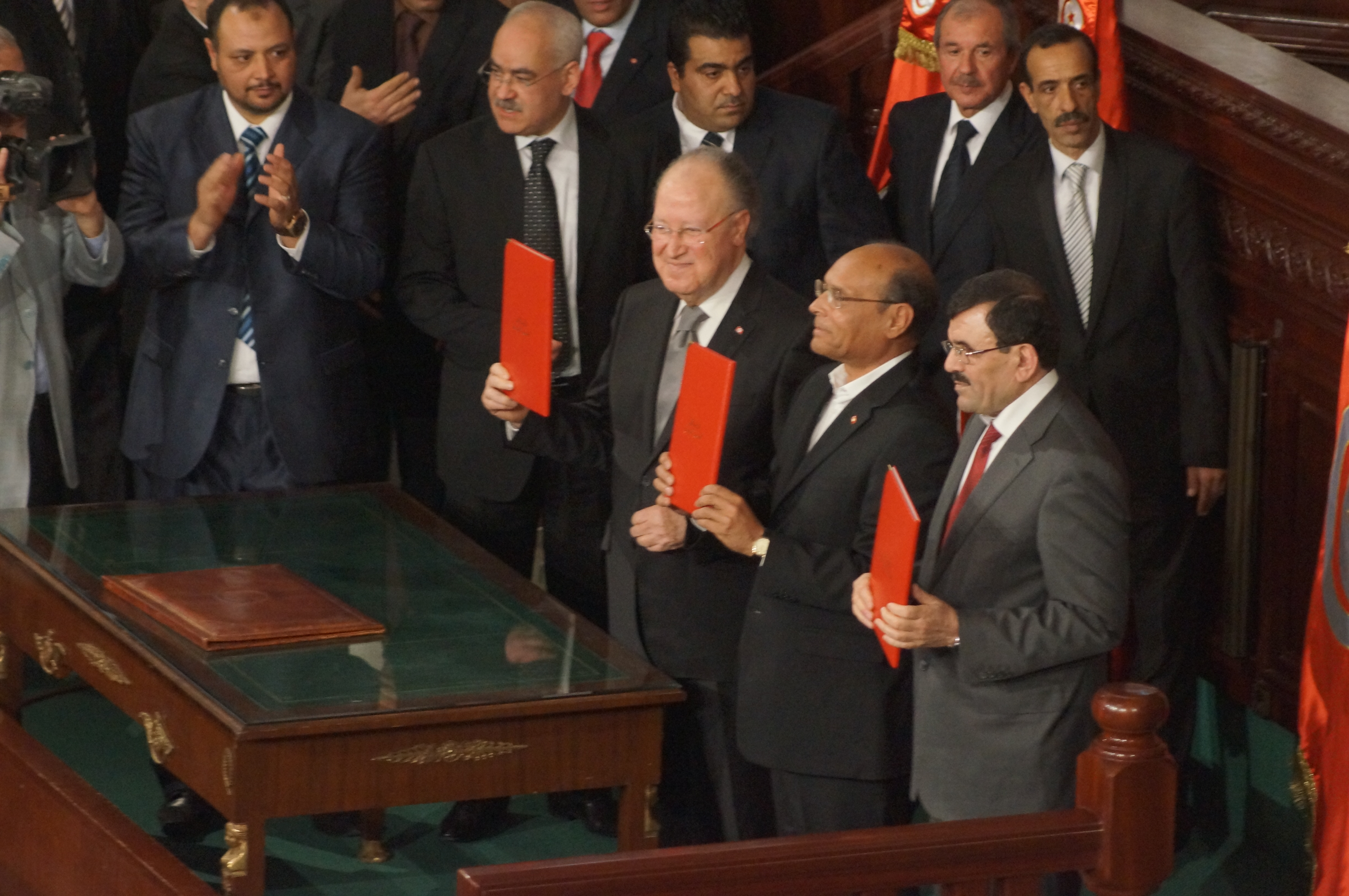
Moncef Marzouki, President of the Republic, Mustapha Ben Jaafar, President of the Constituent Assembly & Ali Larayedh, Head of Government, Le Bardo, January 27, 2014.

On 12 December 2011, the Constituent Assembly of Tunisia, a body elected to govern the country and draft a new constitution, elected Marzouki as interim president, with 155 votes for, 3 against, and 42 blank votes. Blank votes were the result of a boycott from the opposition parties, who considered the new mini-constitution of the country an undemocratic one. He was the first president who was not an heir to the legacy of the country's founding president, Habib Bourguiba.

On 14 December, one day after his accession to office, he appointed Hamadi Jebali of the moderate Islamist Ennahda Movement as Prime Minister. Jebali presented his government on 20 December.

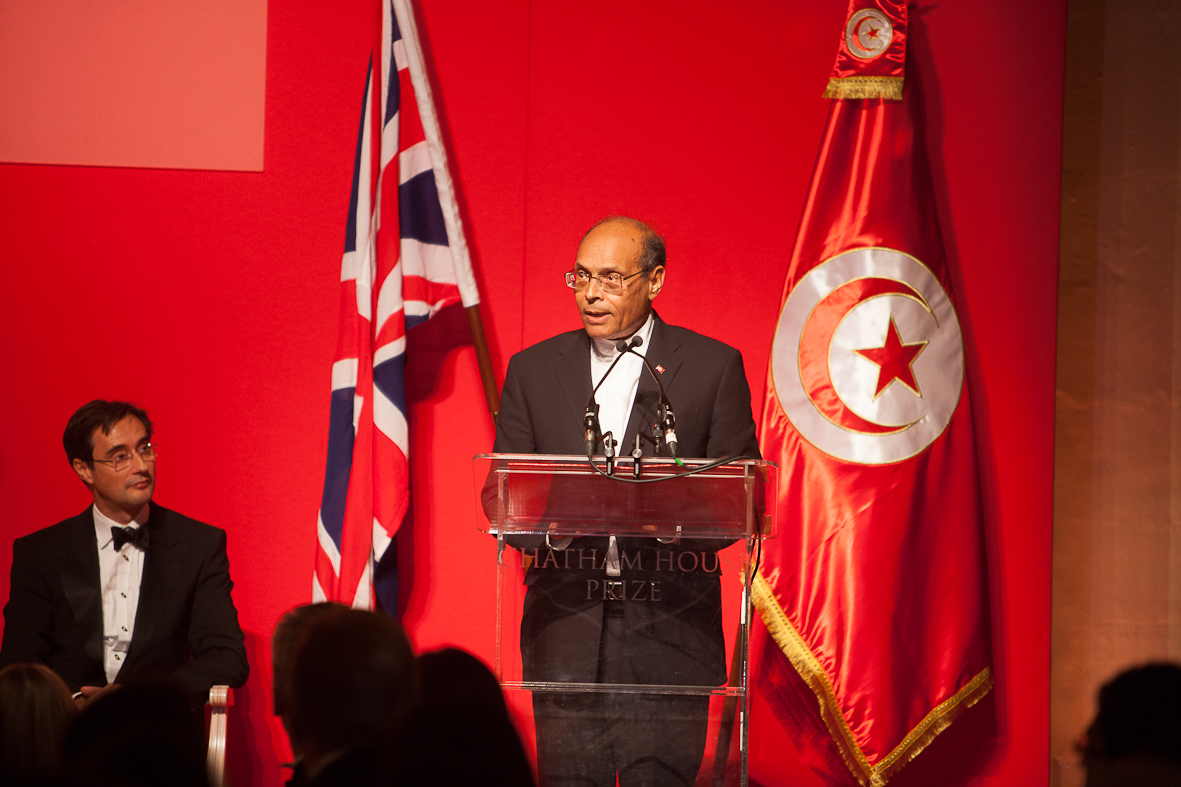
Moncef Marzouki speaking after receiving the Chatham House award 2012.

On 3 May 2012, Nessma TV owner Nabil Karoui and two others were convicted of "blasphemy" and "disturbing public order". The charges stemmed from the network's decision to broadcast a dubbed version of the 2007 Franco-Iranian film Persepolis, which includes several visual depictions of God. Karoui was fined 2,400 dinars for the broadcast, while the station's programming director and the president of the women's organization which provided dubbing for the film were fined 1,200 dinars. Responding to the verdict, Marzouki stated to members of the press in the presidential palace in Tunis, "I think this verdict is bad for the image of Tunisia. Now people in the rest of the world will only be talking about this when they talk about Tunisia."

As President, Marzouki played a leading role in establishing Tunisia's Truth and Dignity Commission in 2014, as a key part of creating a national reconciliation.

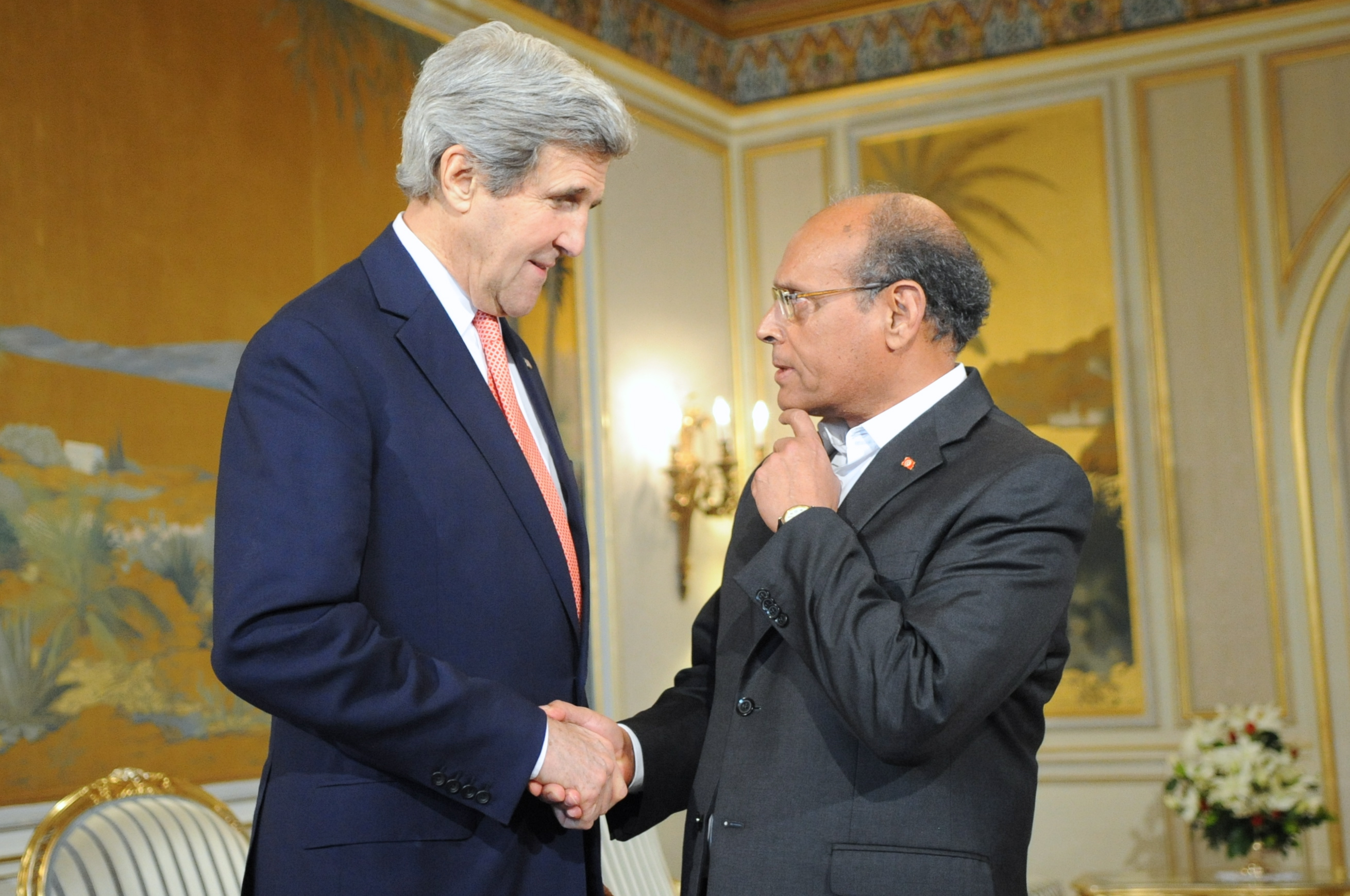
Marzouki with U.S Secretary of State John Kerry, Carthage Palace, 2014.

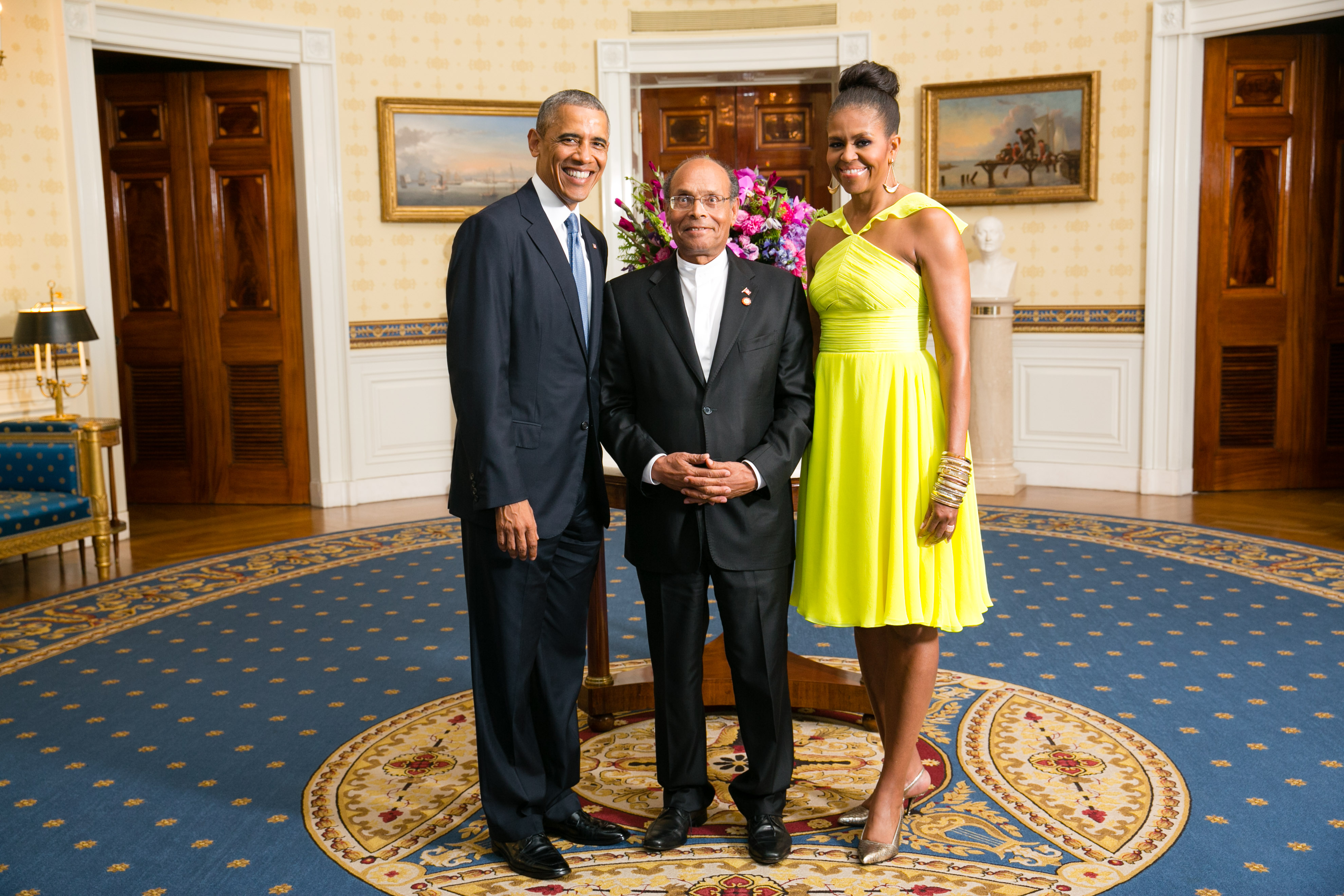
Marzouki with US President Barack Obama and his wife Michelle Obama in 2014.

In March 2014, President Marzouki lifted the state of emergency that had been in place since the outbreak of the 2011 revolution, and a top military chief said soldiers stationed in some of the country's most sensitive areas would return to their barracks. The decree from President Marzouki said the state of emergency ordered in January 2011 is lifted across the country immediately. The state of emergency was imposed by longtime President Zine El Abidine Ben Ali and maintained after he was overthrown. It was repeatedly renewed.

In April 2014, he cut his pay by two-thirds, citing the state's need to be a model in dealing with the deteriorating financial situation.

Marzouki was defeated by Beji Caid Essebsi in the November–December 2014 presidential election, and Essebsi was sworn in as President on 31 December 2014, succeeding Marzouki.

== Post-presidency ==
On 25 June 2015, Marzouki participated in the Freedom Flotilla III to the Gaza Strip. On 29 June, during their approach to the territorial waters of Gaza, but while still in international waters, the flotilla was intercepted by the Israeli navy and taken to the port of Ashdod, where the participants were interviewed. Marzouki was greeted by a delegation of the Israeli Foreign Ministry, but he declined to talk with them. On 30 June, he was deported to Paris and returned to Tunis on 1 July, where he was greeted by hundreds of supporters. In 2016, he was appointed by the African Union to oversee the Comorian presidential election. On 14 October 2021, the Tunisia government under Kais Saied stripped Marzouki of his diplomatic passport. In November 2021, Moncef Marzouki was the subject of an international arrest warrant issued by the Tunisian government for endangering state security. On 23 December 2021, Marzouki was sentenced to four years in prison and was found guilty of “undermining the security of the state from abroad” and of having caused “diplomatic harm”. Marzouki rejected the ruling, describing it as illegal, saying it was “issued by an illegitimate president who overturned the constitution”.

On 29 December 2021, Marzouki vowed to return to Tunisia and "overthrow the incumbent regime". In January 2022, Marzouki was among 19 predominantly high-ranking politicians to be referred to court for trial by the Tunisian judiciary for "electoral violations" allegedly committed during the 2019 presidential elections.

In 2022 Marzouki was sentenced to 4 years in prison in absentia for “assaulting” the security of the state. In 2024, he received another eight-year sentence in absentia for remarks that were interpreted by authorities as incitement and calling for the overthrow of the government. In June 2025, Marzouki was sentenced in absentia by the Tunis Court of First Instance to 22 years' imprisonment on terrorism charges.

== Personal life ==
1. From a first marriage, Moncef Marzouki has two daughters: Myriam and Nadia. Myriam, a former student of the École Normale Supérieure de Paris (ENS-SHS) and an agrégée in philosophy, is a director and artistic director of a theater company. His younger daughter, Nadia, obtained a PhD in political science from Sciences Po in 2008. As a research fellow at the CNRS, her research focuses on religious expertise. The Franco-Tunisian businessman Lotfi Bel Hadj is his nephew.

In December 2011, during a private civil ceremony in Carthage Palace, he married Beatrix Rhein, a French physician.

He owns a house in Port El-Kantaoui, near Sousse.

Moncef Marzouki refuses to wear a tie, preferring the burnous in homage to Tunisian culture.

== Decorations ==
=== Tunisian National Honours ===
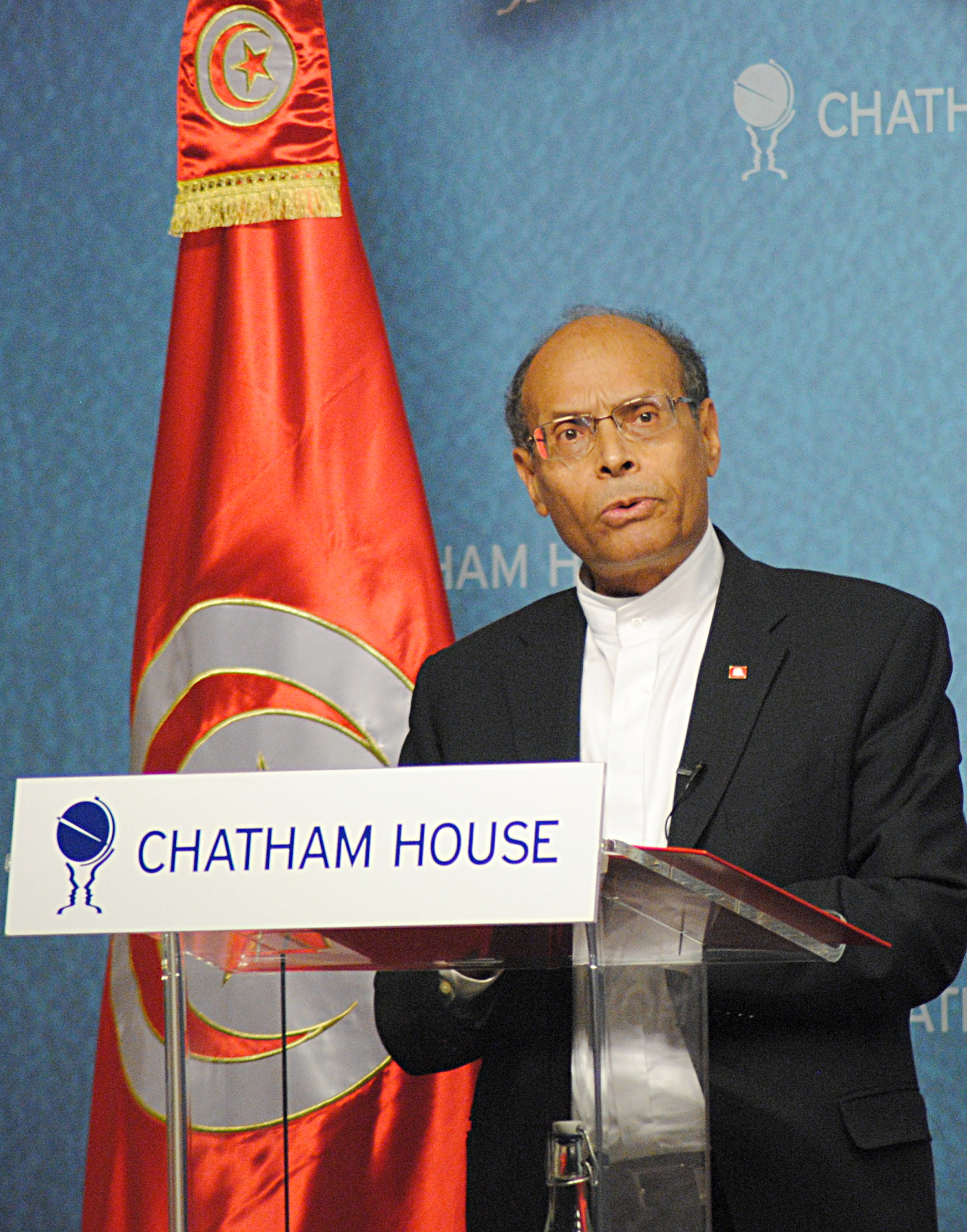
Marzouki during his speech just after receiving the Chatham House Award, London, 2012.

- :
  - Grand Collar of the Order of Independence (In his capacity as President of the Tunisian Republic)
  - Grand Collar of the Order of the Republic (In his capacity as President of the Tunisian Republic)
  - Grand Collar of the National Order of Merit of Tunisia (In his capacity as President of the Tunisian Republic)

=== Foreign Honors ===
- France : Commander of the Legion of Honour (4 July 2013)
- Morocco : Special Class of the Order of Muhammad (31 May 2014)
- Egypt : Grand Cross of the Golden Lion of Alexandria (6 June 2014)
- Niger : Grand Cross of the Order of the Niger (23 June 2014)

== Distinctions and awards ==
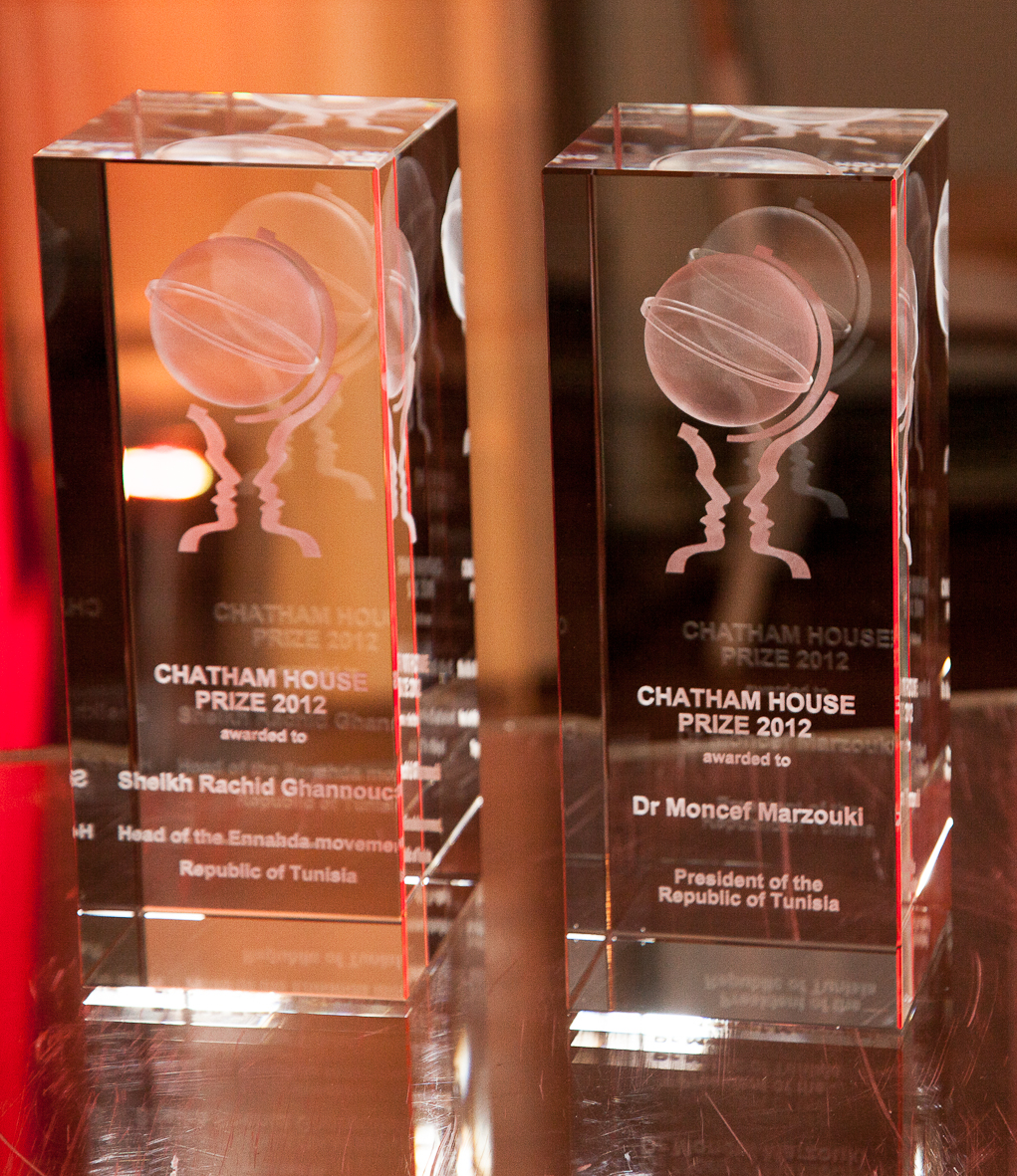
Chatham House prize in 2012, Moncef Marzouki & Rached Ghannouchi.

- The Maghrebian Medicine Prize (1982)
- Foundation Scanno Literary Prize (1988)
- The Price of the Arab Congress of Medicine (1989)
- Human Rights Watch awards for Freedoms (2001)
- Gold Medal of the Islamic Educational, Scientific and Cultural Organization (2012)
- The Chatham House Prize for the year 2012 in London (with Rached Ghannouchi)
- Honorary Degree from University of Tsukuba in 2013
- Al Qods Prize for 2015 in Chicago
- Foundation Ducci Peace Award for 2016 in Rome
- One of the 100 Most Influential Arabs in the World in 2018

== Main publications ==
- Arabes, si vous parliez, ed. Lieu commun, Paris, 1987
- Laisse mon pays se réveiller : vers une quatrième civilisation, ed. Éditions pour le Maghreb arabe, Tunis, 1988
- Le mal arabe, ed. L'Harmattan, Paris, 2004
- Dictateurs en sursis : une voie démocratique pour le monde arabe, ed. de l'Atelier, Paris, 2009
- L'invention d'une démocratie. Les leçons de l'expérience tunisienne, ed. La Découverte, Paris, 2013
- Tunisie, du triomphe au naufrage (with Pierre Piccinin da Prata & Thibaut Werpin), ed. L'Harmattan, Paris, 2013

Non-profit organization positions
Preceded by Mohamed Charfi	President of the Tunisian Human Rights League; 1989–1994	Succeeded by Taoufik Bouderbala
Party political offices
New political party	President of the Congress for the Republic; 2001–2011	Succeeded by Abderraouf Ayadi; Acting
Constituent Assembly of Tunisia
New constituency	Member of the Constituent Assembly for Nabeul's 2nd district 2011	Succeeded by Samia Abbou
Political offices
Preceded by Fouad Mebazaa; Acting	President of Tunisia; 2011–2014	Succeeded by Beji Caid Essebsi
Honorary titles
Preceded by Zine El Abidine Ben Ali	Youngest President at the end of term Since 31 December 2014	Succeeded by Incumbent
