= Al Mustakillah =

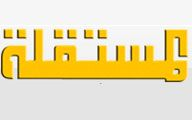
- Country: United Kingdom

Programming
- Language: Arabic

Ownership
- Owner: Mohamed Hechmi Hamdi

History
- Launched: 1999

Links
- Website: www.almustakillah.com

Al Mustakillah (Arabic: المستقلة; or The Independent) is an Arabic language television channel based in London, United Kingdom, aimed towards a Tunisian audience. Founded in 1999 by Mohamed Hechmi Hamdi, it remains owned by his Almustakillah TV Ltd.

During the Ben Ali era, the channel and especially its show The Great Maghreb was an important forum for opposition voices, including Tunisian activist Rachid Ghannouchi, and Sihem Bensedrine, journalist and editor of Kalima online magazine, spokesperson for CNLT (National Committee for Freedoms in Tunisia) and former vice-president of LTDH (Tunisian Human Rights League).

Al-Mustakillah's founder Hechmi Hamdi was alleged to be politically allied with Bin Ali, yet he often interviewed leaders of the Tunisian opposition on his satellite programs. He helped them speak their opinions on 'The Great Maghreb,' widely viewed in Tunisia. In reaction, Bin Ali's Tunisian regime called Hamdi "a traitor and a spy." The government began cracking down on political opposition, and Hamdi fled Tunisia to settle in London.

Much of Al-Mustakillah's programming deals with human rights, democracy and freedom of expression. Among its most popular programs is 'Shedding a Light on the Culture of Human Rights,' hosted by Abdul Hussein Shaban, president of the Arab Human Rights Organisation, U.K.
