= Essid Cabinet =

- Cabinet of Tunisia

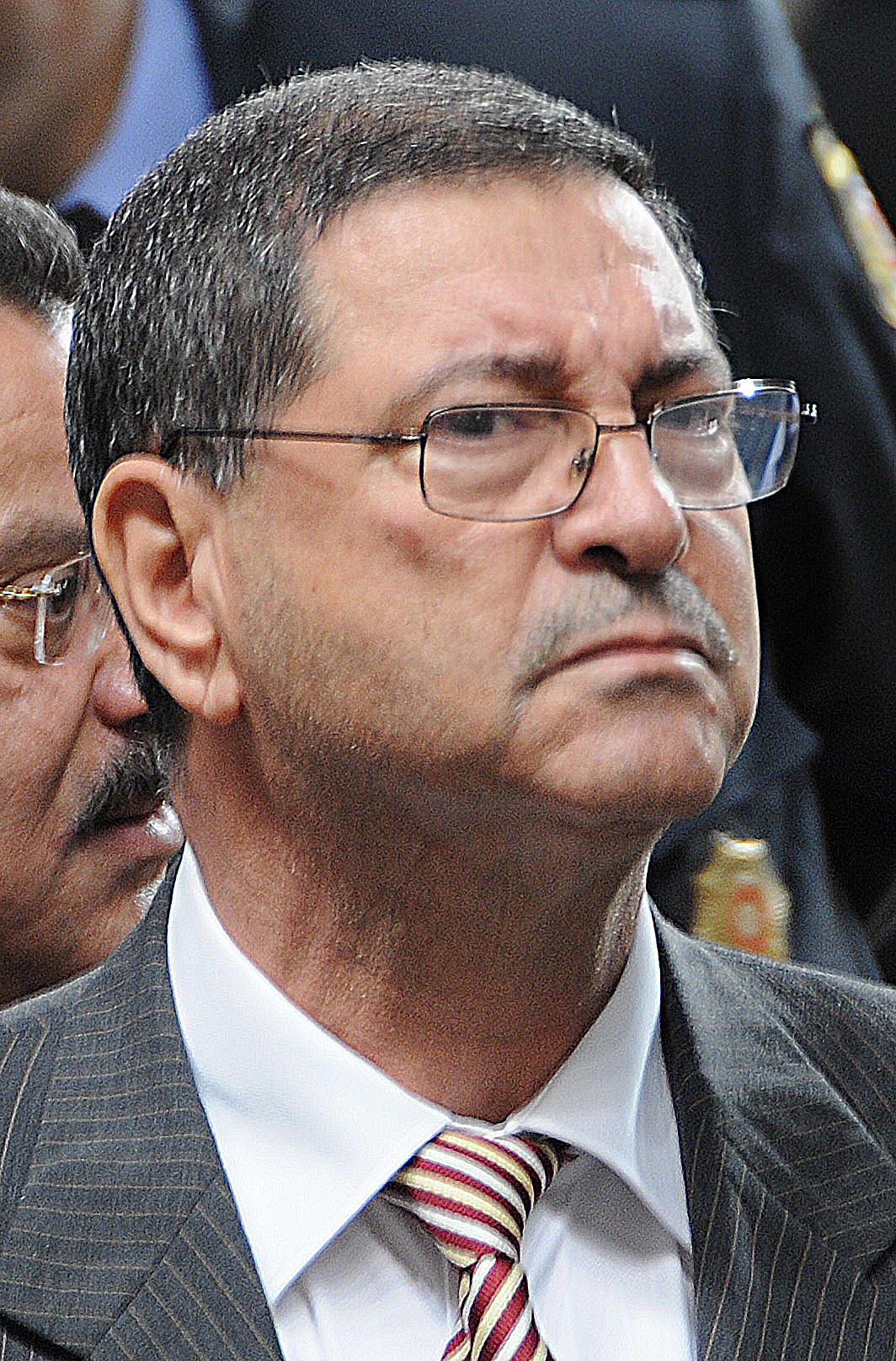
- Date formed: 6 February 2015
- Date dissolved: 27 August 2016 (1 year, 6 months and 21 days)

People and organisations
- Head of state: Beji Caid Essebsi
- Head of government: Habib Essid
- Total no. of members: 42 (incl. Prime Minister)
- Member parties: Independent, Nidaa Tounes, Ennahda, UPL, Afek Tounes
- Status in legislature: Unity government

History
- Election: 2014 Tunisian parliamentary election
- Legislature term: I legislature (2014-2019)
- Predecessor: Jomaa Cabinet (2014–2015)
- Successor: Chahed Cabinet (2016–2020)

The cabinet of Tunisian Head of Government Habib Essid was approved on 5 February 2015 by a majority of 166 of total 217 legislators of Tunisia's Assembly of the Representatives of the People. The unity government consists of 27 ministers and 14 secretaries of state and includes independents, members of Nidaa Tounes, the two liberal parties Free Patriotic Union (UPL) and Afek Tounes, and a member of the Islamist Ennahda.

Essid's first proposal, a minority government of just Nidaa Tounes and the UPL, he had brought forward on 23 January, was retracted after facing enough resistance not to be approved by a parliamentary majority.

== Cabinet members ==
Office	Name	Party
Head of Government	Habib Essid	Independent
Minister of Defence	Farhat Horchani	Independent
Minister of Justice	Mohamed Salah Ben Aïssa	Independent
Minister of Interior	Mohamed Najem Gharsalli	Independent
Minister of Foreign Affairs	Taïeb Baccouche	Nidaa Tounes
Minister of Economy and Finance	Slim Chaker	Nidaa Tounes
Minister of Tourism and Handicrafts	Selma Elloumi Rekik	Nidaa Tounes
Minister of Industry, Energy and Mining	Zakaria Hamad	Independent
Minister of Agriculture	Saâd Seddik	Independent
Minister of Commerce	Ridha Lahouel	Independent
Minister of Social Affairs	Ahmed Ammar Younbaii	Independent
Minister of Higher Education, Scientific Research and ICT	Chiheb Bouden	Independent
Minister of Education	Néji Jalloul	Nidaa Tounes
Minister of Health	Saïd Aïdi	Nidaa Tounes
Minister of Transport	Mahmoud Ben Romdhane	Nidaa Tounes
Minister of Equipment, Housing and Regional Planning	Mohamed Salah Arfaoui	Independent
Minister of Employment and Vocational Training	Zied Ladhari	Ennahda
Minister of Religious Affairs	Othman Battikh	Independent
Minister of Women, Family and Children	Samira Merai	Afek Tounes
Minister of Culture	Latifa Lakhdar	Independent
Minister of Youth and Sports	Maher Ben Dhia	UPL
Minister of Environment and Sustainable Development	Nejib Derouiche	UPL
Ministry of Communication Technologies and the Digital Economy	Noomane Fehri	Afek Tounes
Minister of Development, Investment and International Cooperation	Yassine Brahim	Afek Tounes
Minister of State Property and Land Affairs	Hatem El Euchi	UPL
Minister to the head of government in charge of relations with Parliament	Lazhar Akremi	Nidaa Tounes
Minister to the head of government in charge of Relations with the constitutional institutions and civil society	Kamel Jendoubi	Independent
Chief Cabinet Secretary	Ahmed Zarrouk	Nidaa Tounes
Secretary of State for Security Affairs	Rafik Chelly	Independent
Secretary of State for Local Affairs	Hédi Majdoub	Independent
Secretary of State for Foreign Affairs	M'hamed Ezzine Chelaifa	Independent
Secretary of State for Arab and African Affairs	Touhami Abdouli	Tunisian National Movement
Secretary of State for Finance	Boutheina Ben Yaghlane	Ennahda
Secretary of State for Development, Investment and International Cooperation	Lamia Zribi	Independent
Secretary of State for International Cooperation	Amel Azzouz	Ennahda
Secretary of State for Emigration and Social Integration	Belgacem Sabri	Independent
Secretary of State in charge of the Dossier of the Martyrs and Wounded of the Revolution	Majdouline Cherni	Independent
Secretary of State to the Minister of Health in charge of upgrading hospitals	Nejmeddine Hamrouni	Ennahda
Secretary of State to the Minister of Youth and Sports in charge of Youth	Chokri Terzi	Independent
Secretary of State to the Minister of Agriculture, Water Resources and Fisheries in charge of Agricultural Production	Amel Nafti	Independent
Secretary of State to the Minister of Agriculture, Water Resources and Fisheries in charge of Fisheries	Youssef Chahed	Nidaa Tounes
Secretary of State to the Minister of Equipment, Housing and Regional Planning in charge of Housing	Anis Ghedira	Nidaa Tounes
