= Chahed Cabinet =

- Cabinet of Tunisia

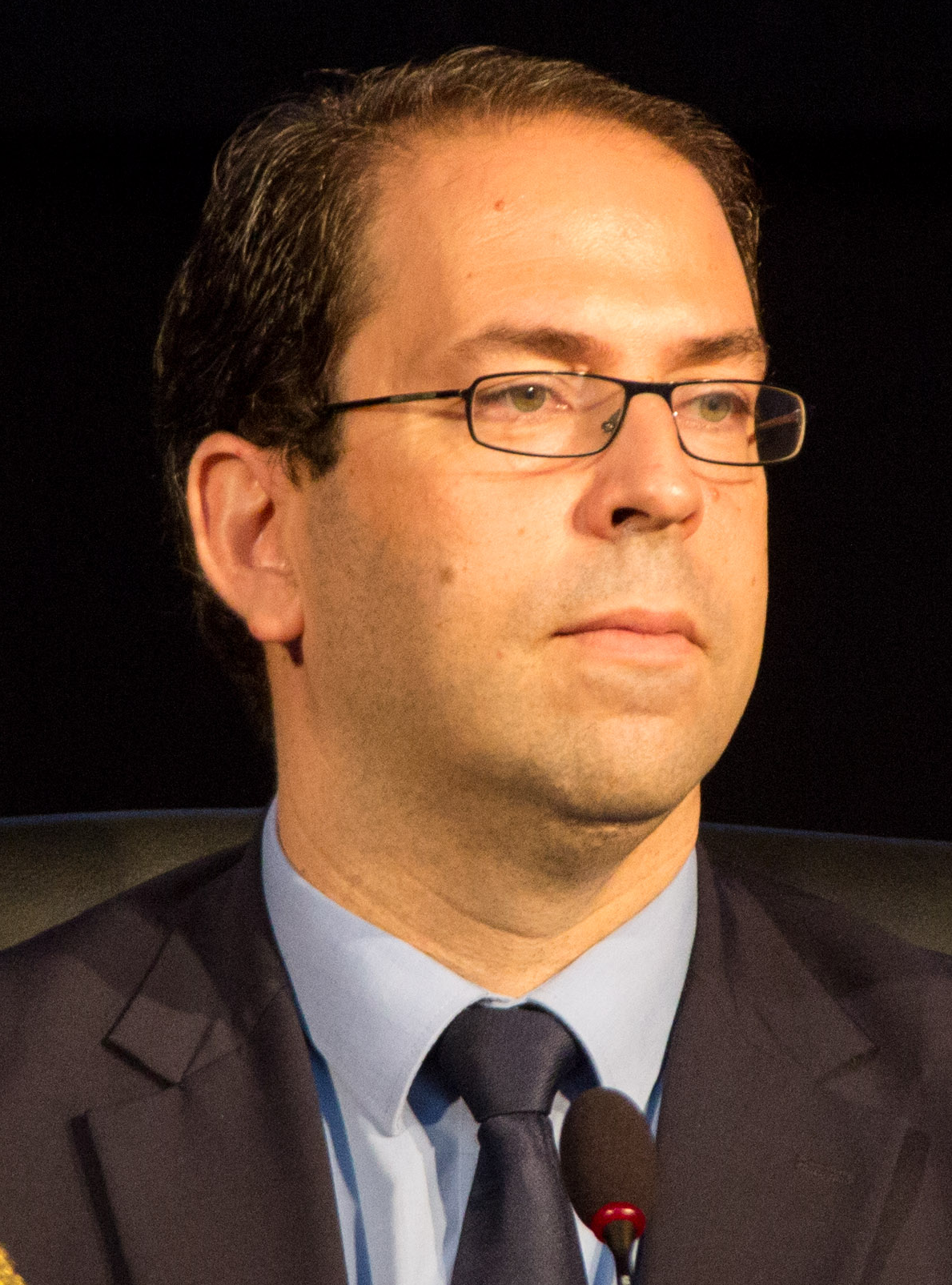
- Date formed: 27 August 2016
- Date dissolved: 27 February 2020 (3 years and 6 months)

People and organisations
- Head of state: Beji Caid Essebsi, Mohamed Ennaceur (acting), Kais Saied
- Head of government: Youssef Chahed
- Total no. of members: 41 (incl. Prime Minister)
- Member parties: Independent, Nidaa Tounes, Ennahda, Afek Tounes, Al-Massar, El Moubadra, Al Joumhouri, Democratic Alliance
- Status in legislature: Unity government

History
- Election: 2014 Tunisian parliamentary election
- Legislature term: I legislature (2014-2019)
- Predecessor: Essid Cabinet (2015–16)
- Successor: Fakhfakh Cabinet (2020)

The Chahed Cabinet is the 29th government of the Tunisian Republic, which was declared on 20 August 2016. The Government was approved on 27 August 2016 by a majority of 167 of total 217 legislators of Tunisia's Assembly of the Representatives of the People.The unity government consists of 26 ministers and 14 secretaries of state and includes independents, members of Nidaa Tounes, Ennahdha, Afek Tounes, Al-Massar, Al Joumhouri, El Moubadra, Democratic Alliance.

== Cabinet members ==
Office	Name	Party
Head of Government	Youssef Chahed	Nidaa Tounes
Minister of Interior	Hédi Majdoub	Independent
Minister of Justice	Ghazi Jeribi	Independent
Minister of Defence	Farhat Horchani	Independent
Minister of Foreign Affairs	Khemaies Jhinaoui	Nidaa Tounes
Minister of Finance	Lamia Zribi	Independent
Minister of Development, Investment and International Cooperation	Fadhel Abdelkefi	Independent
Minister of Education	Néji Jalloul	Nidaa Tounes
Minister of Higher Education, Scientific Research and ICT	Slim Khalbous	Independent
Minister of Culture	Mohamed Zine El Abidine	Independent
Minister of Health	Samira Merai	Afek Tounes
Minister of Women, Family and Children	Neziha Labidi	El Moubadra
Minister of Tourism and Handicrafts	Selma Elloumi	Nidaa Tounes
Minister of Youth and Sports	Majdouline Cherni	Nidaa Tounes
Minister of Agriculture, Water Resources and Fisheries	Samir Taïeb	Al-Massar
Minister of Industry and Commerce	Zied Ladhari	Ennahda
Minister of Social Affairs	Mohamed Trabelsi	Independent
Minister of Employment and Vocational Training	Imed Hammami	Ennahda
Minister of the Local Affairs and Environment	Riadh Mouakher	Afek Tounes
Minister of Energy, Mining and Renewable Energies	Hela Cheikhrouhou	Independent
Minister of Transport	Anis Ghedira	Nidaa Tounes
Minister of Equipment, Housing and Spatial Planning	Mohamed Salah Arfaoui	Independent
Minister of Public Service, Governance and the Fight against Corruption	Abid Briki	Independent
Minister of Religious Affairs	Abdeljalil Ben Salem	Independent
Minister of Communication Technologies and the Digital Economy	Anouar Maârouf	Ennahda
Minister in charge of Relations with Parliament	Iyed Dahmani	Al Joumhouri
Minister in charge of Relations with constitutional bodies, civil society and human rights organizations	Mehdi Ben Gharbia	Democratic Alliance
Secretary of State for Environment	Chokri Belhassen	Nidaa Tounes
Secretary of State for Mines	Hachem Hmidi	Nidaa Tounes
Secretary of State for Commerce	Fayçal Hafiane	Nidaa Tounes
Secretary of State for Transport	Hichem Ben Ahmed	Afek Tounes
Secretary of State for Finance	Mabrouk Korchid	Independent
Secretary of State to the Minister of Youth and Sports in charge of Youth	Faten Kallel	Afek Tounes
Secretary of State for Sports	Imed Jabri	Nidaa Tounes
Secretary of State for Digital Economy	Habib Debbabi	Ennahda
Secretary of State for Scientific Research	Khalil Amiri	Ennahda
Secretary of State for Agricultural Production	Omar Béhi	Independent
Secretary of State to the Minister of Vocational Training in charge of Private Initiative	Sayida Ounissi	Ennahda
Secretary of State for Foreign Affairs	Sabri Bachtobji	Independent
Secretary of State to the Minister of Agriculture in charge of Water Resources and Fisheries	Abdallah Rabhi	Independent
Secretary of State in charge of Immigration and Tunisians abroad	Radhouane Ayara	Nidaa Tounes
