= Liberalism in Tunisia =

Liberalism in Tunisia, or Tunisian Liberalism, is a school of political ideology that encompasses various political parties in the country.

== Social Liberal Party ==
in September 1988, the Social Liberal Party (PSL) was founded under the name "Social Party for Progress", but was renamed in October 1993 to reflect its liberal ideology. As well as liberal social and political reforms, the PSL advocates economic liberalisation, including the privatisation of state-owned firms. The party is a member of the Liberal International and the Africa Liberal Network.

== Ettajdid Movement ==
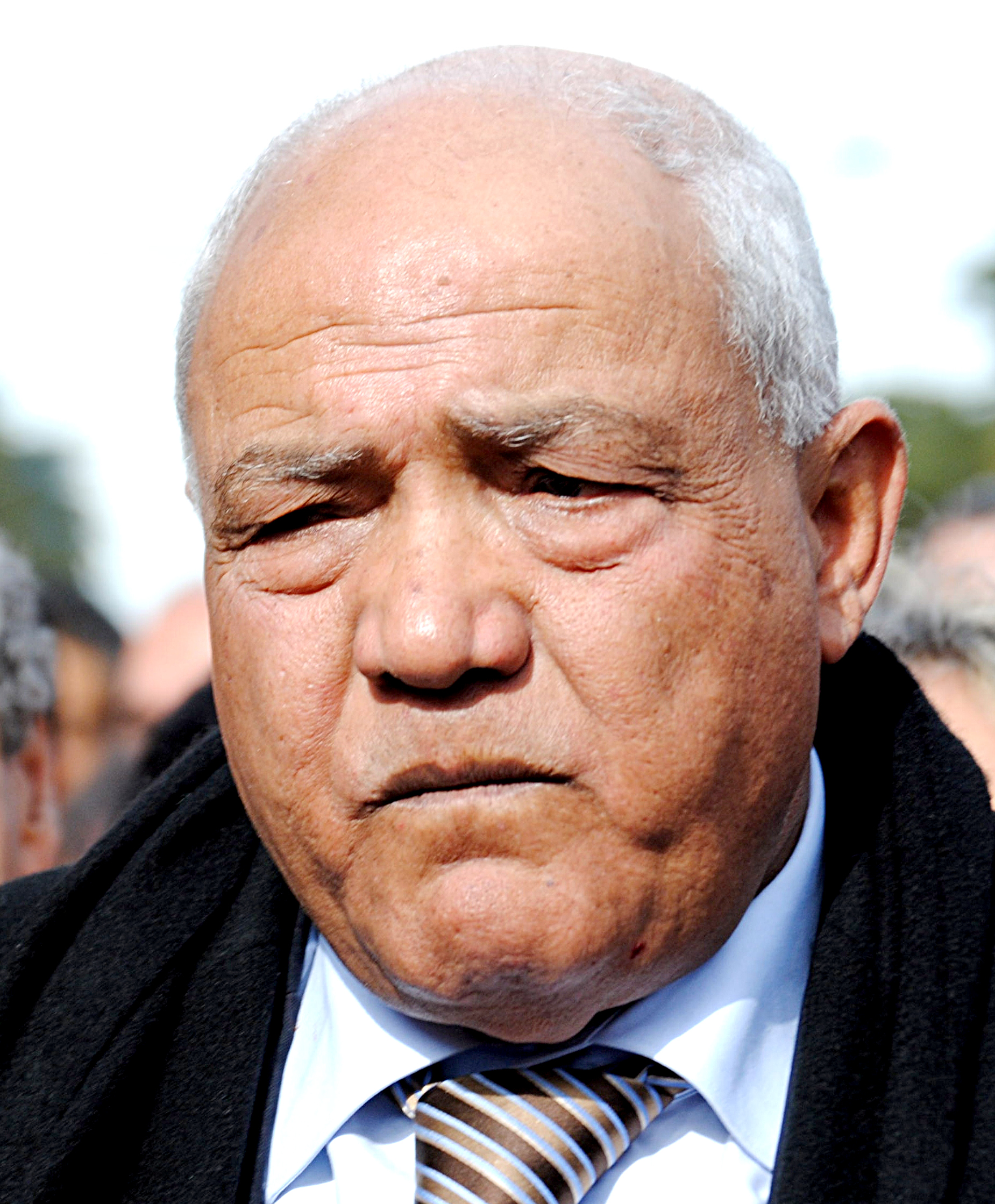
Ahmed Brahim

Active from 1993 to 2012, the Ettajdid Movement (Movement for Renewal) was a centre-left secularist, democratic socialist and social liberal political party in Tunisia. It was led by Ahmed Ibrahim. For the Constituent assembly election, Ettajdid formed a strongly secularist alliance called Democratic Modernist Pole (PDM), of which it was the mainstay.

Ahmed Brahim was the First Secretary of the movement and also the leader of the Democratic Modernist Pole until April 2012, when his party merged into the Social Democratic Path of which he became the president. He was the Ettajdid Movement's candidate for President of Tunisia in the 2009 presidential election. Brahim was in favor of the emergence of a "democratic modern and secular [laicist] state" not connected with Islamists. According to Brahim, this would require "radical" reform of the electoral system, which would improve the political climate in guaranteeing freedom of assembly and a large scale independent press, as well as repealing a law that regulated public discourse of electoral candidates.

== Progressive Democratic Party ==
In 1983, the Progressive Democratic Party (PDP) was founded under the name of Progressive Socialist Rally, and gained legal recognition on 12 September 1988. It was secular and liberal party. The party was renamed as Progressive Democratic Party in 2001. Under the rule of Ben Ali it was a legal opposition party, but subjected to political repression. After the Tunisian revolution it was one of the major left-leaning secular political forces. It was led by Ahmed Najib Chebbi and Maya Jribi. On 9 April 2012, it merged into the Republican Party. Maya Jribi, an outspoken feminist and anti-zionist, has been the first woman to lead a political party in Tunisia.

The Progressive Democratic Party had a newspaper, Al-Mawqif.

== Congress for the Republic ==
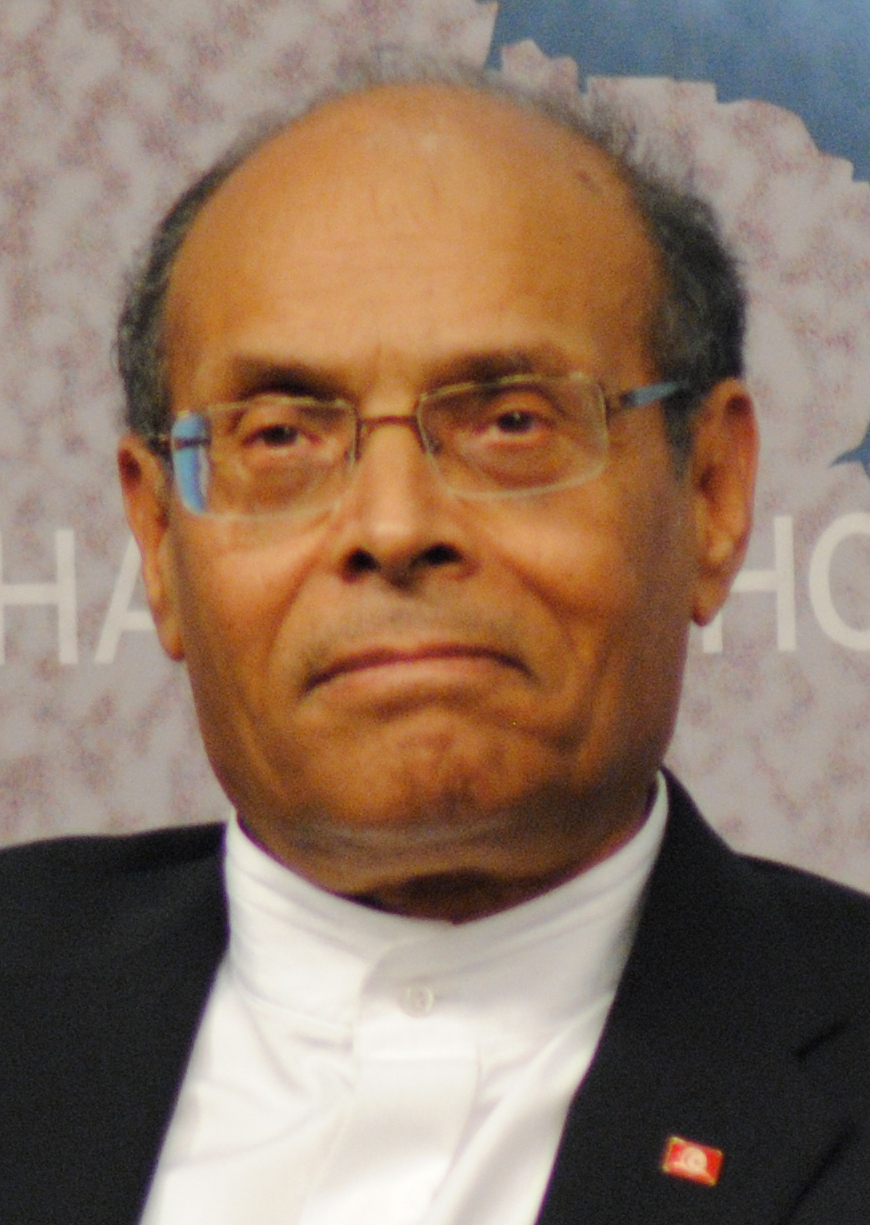
Moncef Marzouki, founder of Congress for the Republic

On 25 July 2001, the creation of the Congress for the Republic (CPR) was declared. Is a centre-left, liberal and secular political party founded by 31 people including the physician, medicine professor and human rights activist Moncef Marzouki as president, Naziha Réjiba (Oum Ziad) as Secretary-general, Abderraouf Ayadi as vice-president, Samir Ben Amor as Treasurer, and Mohamed Chakroun as Honorary President. The CPR declared that it was aimed to install a republican form of government "for the first time"in Tunisia, including freedom of speech, freedom of association, and the holding of "free, honest" elections, "guaranteed by national and international observers able to genuinely check all levels of the electoral process". The CPR's declaration also called for a new constitution, strict separation of the different branches of government, human rights guarantees, gender equality, and a constitutional court for protecting individual and collective rights. The CPR called for renegotiating Tunisian commitments toward the European Union, for Tunisia to support the rights of national self-determination, in particular for the Palestinian people.

== Tunisian Pirate Party ==
Formed in 2010 and legalised on 12 March 2012, the Tunisian Pirate Party is a small political party in Tunisia. It's one of the first outgrowths of the Pirate Party movement in continental Africa. The party achieved notoriety during the Tunisian revolution, as party members declared their intention to break a media blackout on the social unrest taking place across the country. Members distributed censorship circumvention software, and assisted in documenting human rights abuses during the riots in the cities of Sidi Bouzid, Siliana, and Thala. After the revolution, a Pirate Party member who had been detained during the unrest, Slim Amamou, was briefly selected as Secretary of State for Sport and Youth in the new government. He later resigned in protest of the transitional government's censorship of several websites at the request of the army. He was arrested on 6 January 2011 during the protests that led to the Tunisian Revolution, alongside others including Azyz Amami. The Anonymous hacktivist group had led attacks on the Tunisian government's websites, and Amamou was held for five days by the state security forces under the suspicion of having collaborated with the hackers. Following a mass internet campaign and protest, Amamou and other bloggers were released from government custody. He supports the legalisation of cannabis in Tunisia. He is an advocate for network neutrality and opposes internet censorship.

== Tunisian Revolution ==
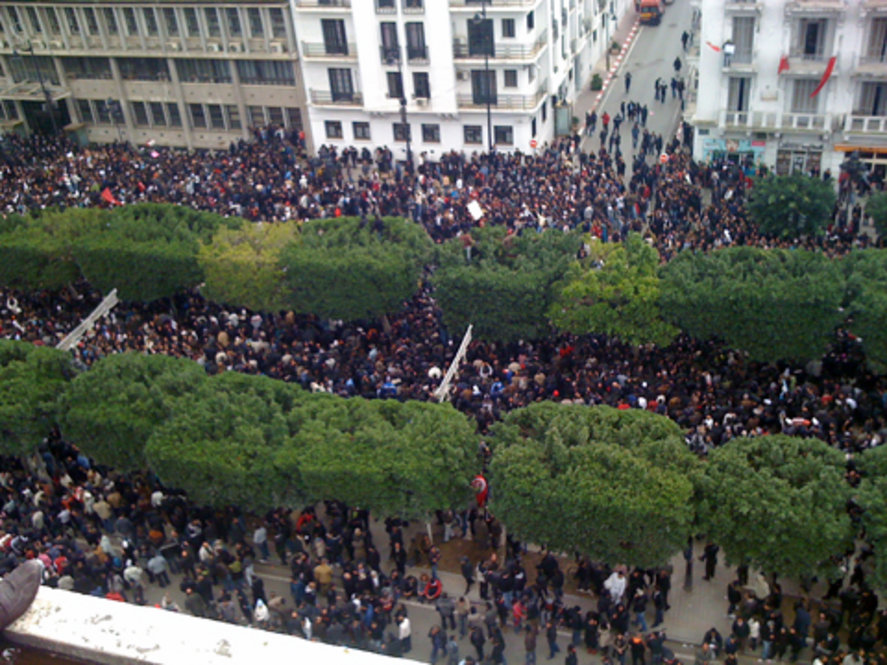
Protesters on Avenue Habib Bourguiba, downtown Tunis on 14 January 2011, a few hours before president Zine El Abidine Ben Ali fled the country

The Tunisian Revolution was an intensive campaign of civil resistance, including a series of street demonstrations taking place in Tunisia, and led to the ousting of longtime president Zine El Abidine Ben Ali in January 2011. It eventually led to a thorough democratization of the country and to free and democratic elections with the Tunisian Constitution of 2014, which is seen as progressive, increases human rights, gender equality, government duties toward people, lays the ground for a new parliamentary system and makes Tunisia a decentralized and open government. And with the held of the country first parliamentary elections since the 2011 Arab Spring and its presidentials on 23 November 2014, which finished its transition to a democratic state. These elections were characterized by the fall in popularity of Ennahdha, for the secular Nidaa Tounes party, which became the first party of the country.

The demonstrations were caused by high unemployment, food inflation, corruption, a lack of political freedoms like freedom of speech and poor living conditions. The protests constituted the most dramatic wave of social and political unrest in Tunisia in three decades and resulted in scores of deaths and injuries, most of which were the result of action by police and security forces against demonstrators. The protests were sparked by the self-immolation of Mohamed Bouazizi on 17 December 2010 and led to the ousting of President Zine El Abidine Ben Ali 28 days later on 14 January 2011, when he officially resigned after fleeing to Saudi Arabia, ending 23 years in power. Labour unions were said to be an integral part of the protests. The Tunisian National Dialogue Quartet was awarded the 2015 Nobel Peace Prize for "its decisive contribution to the building of a pluralistic democracy in Tunisia in the wake of the Tunisian Revolution of 2011". The protests inspired similar actions throughout the Arab world.

== Maghrebi Republican Party ==
On 22 March 2011 the Maghrebi Republican Party (PRM) was founded by Mohamed Bouebdelli, head of the Free University of Tunis, under the name of Maghrebi Liberal Party and it changed its name to Maghrebi Republican Party on 13 April 2012. The party is liberal.

== Afek Tounes ==
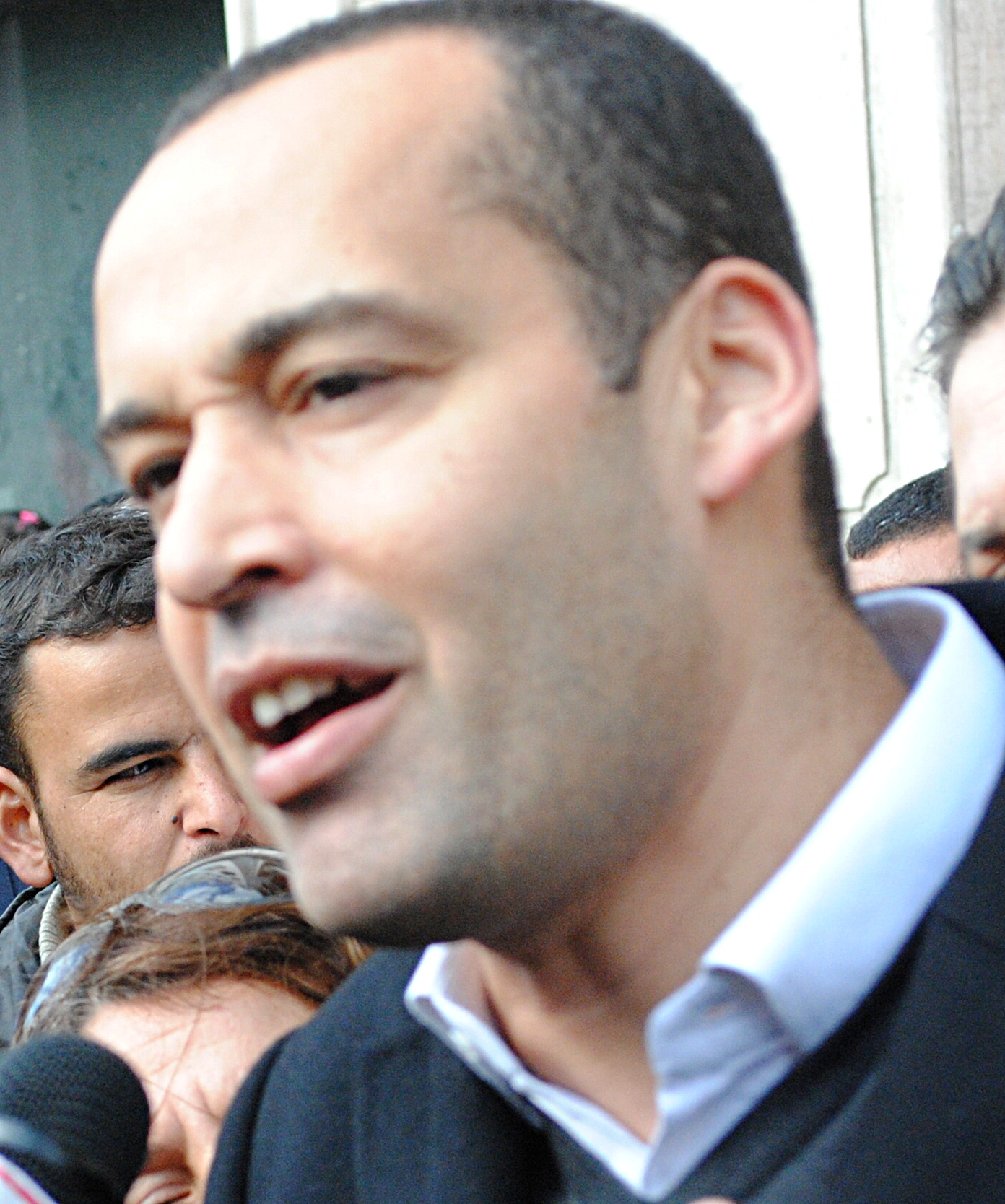
Yassine Brahim, leader of the Afek Tounes party

Founded on March 28, 2011, Afek Tounes (Tunisian Horizons) is a centre-right political party in Tunisia. Its program is liberal, focusing on secularism and civil liberties. The party mainly appealed to intellectuals and the upper class. After underperforming in the 2011 Constituent Assembly election, Afek Tounes joined talks with other secularist and liberal parties, especially the Progressive Democratic Party to form a "big party of the centre". The merger was completed on 9 April 2012. The new party is called the Republican Party. In August 2013, Yassine Brahim, current leader of the party, and other former party members left the Republican Party to revive Afek Tounes.

== Pirate Party ==
Formed on 7 April 2012, the Pirate Party is a small political party in Tunisia. It is the second Pirate party in Tunisia after the Tunisian Pirate Party. On the Pirate Party's official website, it lists its main objectives as preserving the right of every citizen of the absolute freedom of expression, communication, association and assembly, direct democracy and the inclusion of digital technology in this area support, dedicated to the neutrality of the Internet, protecting the freedom of information and independence of investigative journalism, unconditional and free access to information, open government, anti-censorship of all kinds, among others.

== Republican Party ==
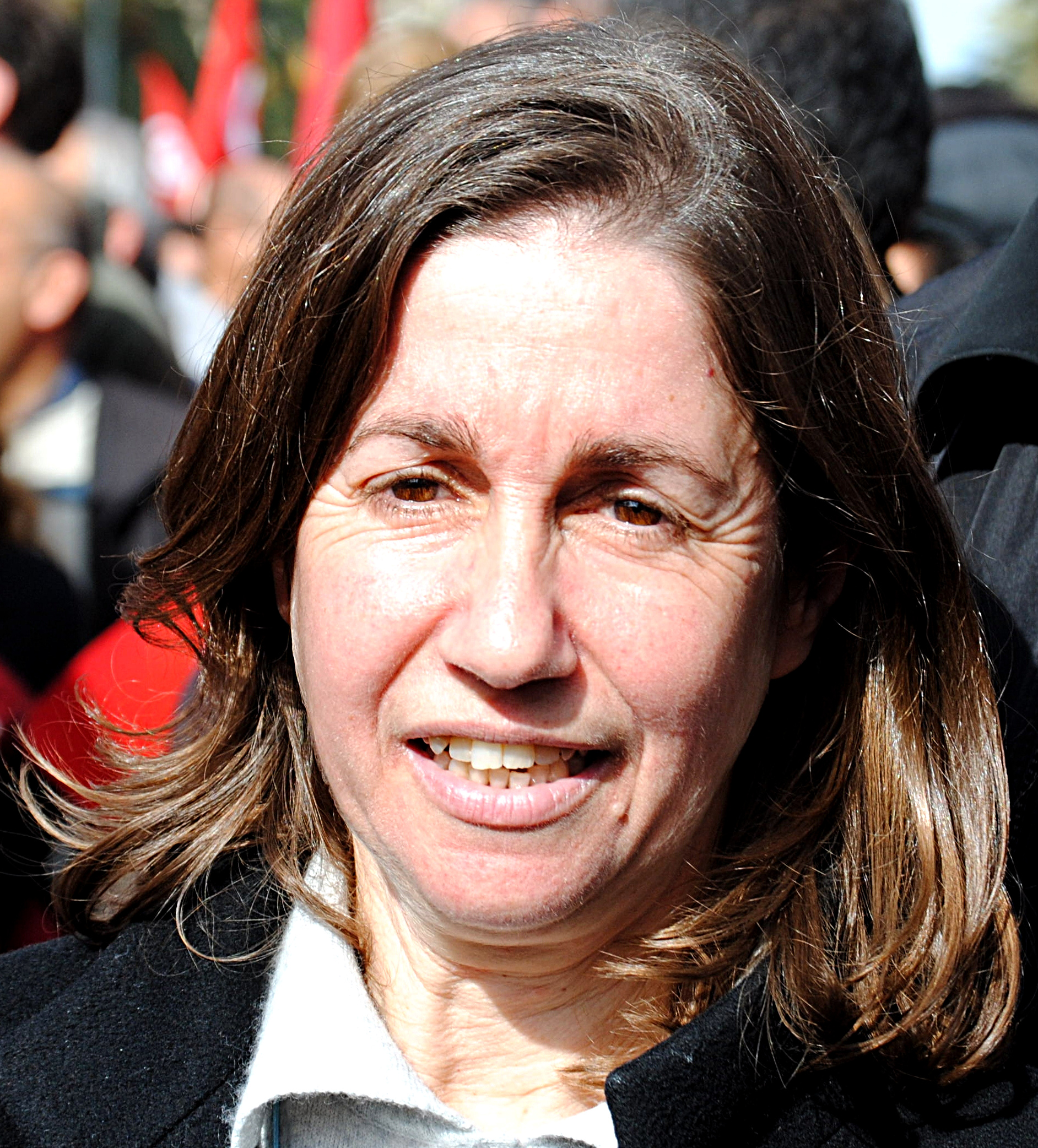
Maya Jribi has been the first woman to lead a political party in Tunisia.

On 9 April 2012, the Republican Party was formed as a merger of the Progressive Democratic Party (PDP), Afek Tounes and the Tunisian Republican Party, several minor parties and independents. The party is centrist and liberal, it's led by Maya Jribi who was previously the secretary-general of the PDP. The party held 11 out of 217 seats and was the largest oppositional party in the National Constituent Assembly of Tunisia. The party withdrew from the Union for Tunisia coalition, though it is still part of the National Salvation Front.

After the founding congress, nine assemblymen elected for the PDP contested the leadership vote and temporarily suspended their party membership. Those 9 members became part of the Democratic Alliance Party.

== Nidaa Tounes ==
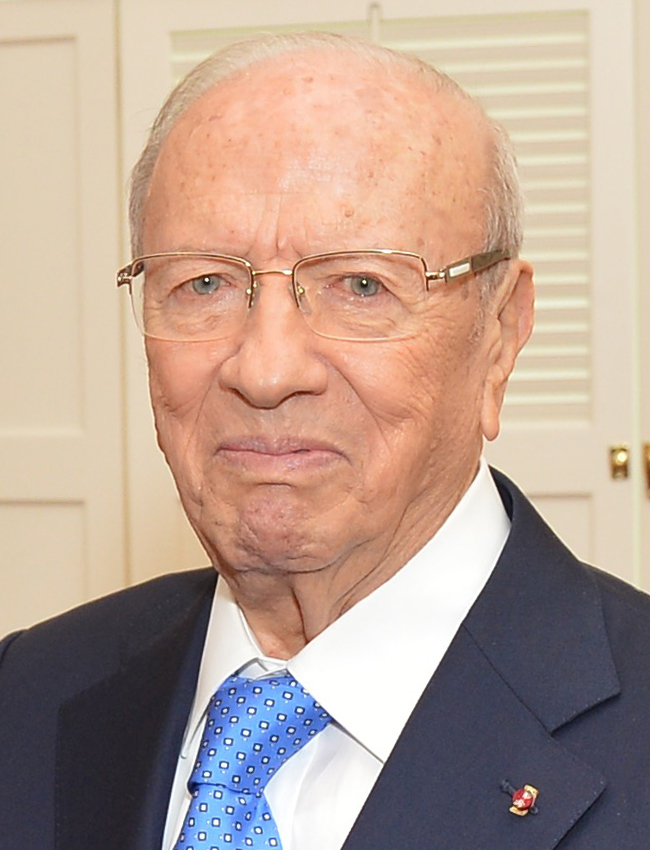
5th President of Tunisia Beji Caid Essebsi, founder of founder of the Nidaa Tounes

After being founded in 2012, Nidaa Tounes (Call of Tunisia) won a plurality of seats in the October 2014 parliamentary election. It's a big tent secularist political party in Tunisia. The party's founding leader Beji Caid Essebsi was elected President of Tunisia in the 2014 presidential election. The party's foundation was announced when former prime minister Beji Caid Essebsi on April 20, 2012, launched his Call for Tunisia as a response to post-revolutionary "instances of disturbing extremism and violence that threaten public and individual liberties, as well as the security of the citizens". It was officially founded on 16 June 2012 and describes itself as a "modernist" and "social-democratic" party of the moderate left. However, it also includes notable economically liberal currents.
