= Samira Merai =

Tunisian doctor and politician

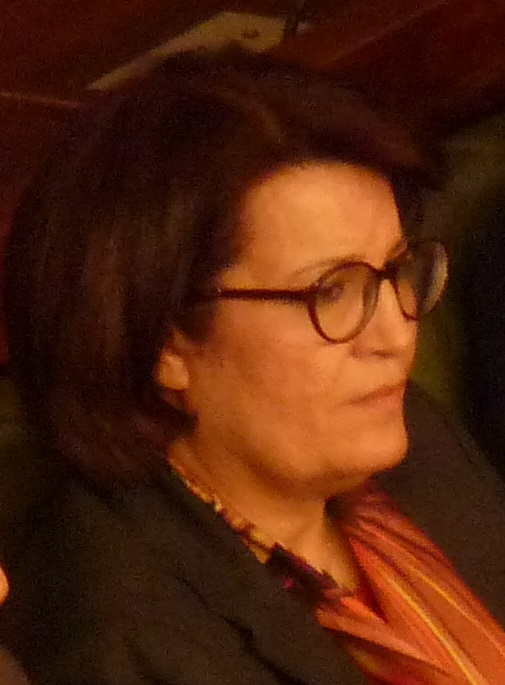

Minister of Public Health
- In office 27 August 2016 – 12 September 2017
- Prime Minister: Youssef Chahed
- Preceded by: Said Aidi
- Succeeded by: Slim Chaker

Minister of Women, Family and Children
- In office 2 February 2015 – 27 August 2016
- Prime Minister: Habib Essid
- Preceded by: Saber Bouatay
- Succeeded by: Néziha Labidi

Personal details
- Born: 10 January 1963 (age 63) Zarzis, Tunisia
- Party: Afek Tounes (2011–2012); Republican Party (2012–2013); Afek Tounes (since 2013)

Samira Merai Friaa (born 10 January 1963) is a Tunisian doctor and politician who served as Minister of Public Health from 2016 to 2017.

== Early life and education ==
Merai was born on 10 January 1963 in Zarzis. She attended the technical high school in Medenine and obtained a degree in mathematics and science in 1981. She graduated from the Faculty of Medicine in Tunis in 1986, specialising in pulmonology.

== Career ==
Merai began working at the Abderrahmen-Mami Hospital in Aryanah in 1993. In 2003, she was appointed Associate Professor of Respirology at the Faculty of Medicine in Tunis. She is a member of the European Respiratory Society and the American Thoracic Society.

Merai is a member of the Afek Tounes party and joined its central committee in May 2011. She was elected to the Constituent Assembly for the constituency of Medenine on 23 October 2011. On 1 February 2012, she was elected Deputy Speaker of the NCA. After the dissolution of Afek Tounes, she became a member of the Republican Party, but resigned on 10 July 2013. She was not re-elected at the 2014 legislative elections.

Merai served as the Chair of the Committee on Women's Rights of the Parliamentary Assembly of the Mediterranean in 2014.

On 2 February 2015, Merai was appointed Minister of Women, Family and Children in the government of Prime Minister Habib Essid. On 20 August 2016, she was appointed Minister of Public Health in the cabinet of Youssef Chahed.

== Personal life ==
Merai is married and has three children.
