= Abderrazak Cheraït =

Tunisian politician (1937–2024)

- عبد الرزاق شريط
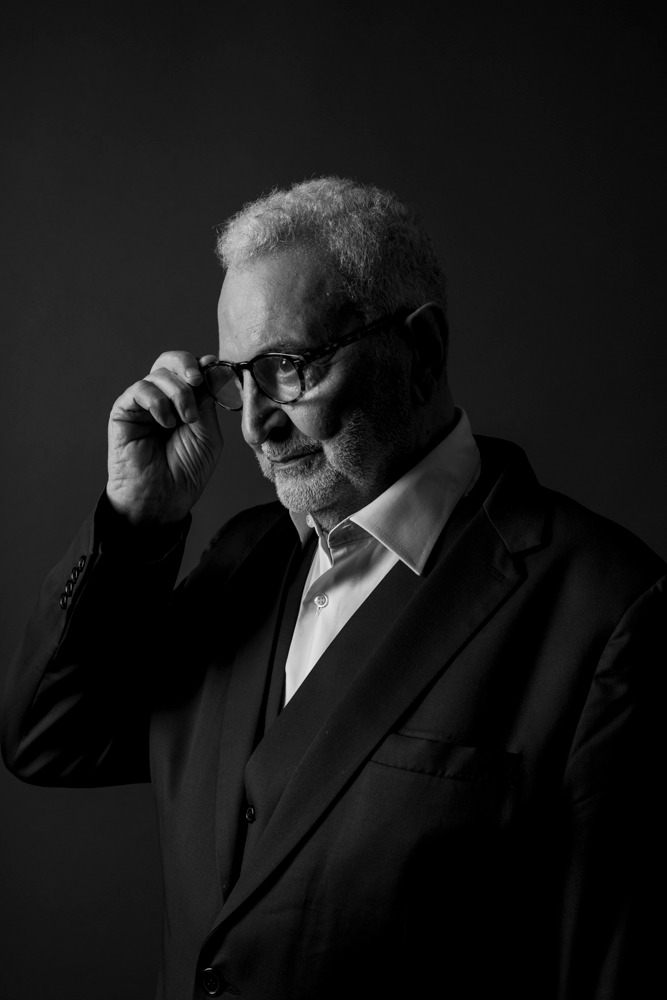

Member of the Assembly of the Representatives of the People
- In office 2 December 2014 – 13 November 2019
- Constituency: Tozeur

Mayor of Tozeur
- In office 1995–2008
- Preceded by: Mohamed Moncef Gadi
- Succeeded by: Amor Ezzedine

Personal details
- Born: 1937 Tunis, French protectorate of Tunisia
- Died: 3 November 2024 (aged 86–87)
- Party: Independent
- Occupation: Writer

Abderrazak Cheraït (Arabic: عبد الرزاق شريط; 1937 – 3 November 2024) was a Tunisian writer and politician.

== Life and career ==
Born in Tunis in 1937, Cheraït resisted the French protectorate from the beginning of his career. He created his first group of Destour supporters in 1954, though he was also a left-wing activist, having founded the Union des étudiants arabes en France. He moved to France in 1961 to pursue banking studies and joined the Tunisian General Labour Union in 1964. He founded the Banque du Peuple, which granted microcredits to young developers and worker cooperatives. In 1966, the bank changed its name to Banque du Sud for political reasons. In 1970, he entered the private sector in the electrical industry, which led to his creation of the Société Méditerranéenne des Travaux Electromécaniques in 1976. In 1980, he established the Société tunisienne d'éclairage with Mazda and Philips.

In 1990, Cheraït founded the first private museum in Tunisia, the Dar Cherait Museum, which holds Tunisian art and cultural heirlooms. In 1995, he was elected mayor of Tozeur. During his tenure, the city became known as the "cleanest in Tunisia" and attracted tourists when it was previously considered "too archaic". He left the post in 2008.

Following the Tunisian revolution, Cheraït founded the Parti de la voix de la république on 30 May 2011. In 2014, he was elected to the Assembly of the Representatives of the People in the Electoral constituency of Tozeur as an independent. That year, he supported Beji Caid Essebsi in the presidential election.

Cheraït died on 3 November 2024.

== Publications ==
- Abou el Kacem Chebbi (2002)
- Les enfants du divin. Les Allahistes (2010)
