= Néji Jalloul =

Tunisian politician

- ناجي جلول
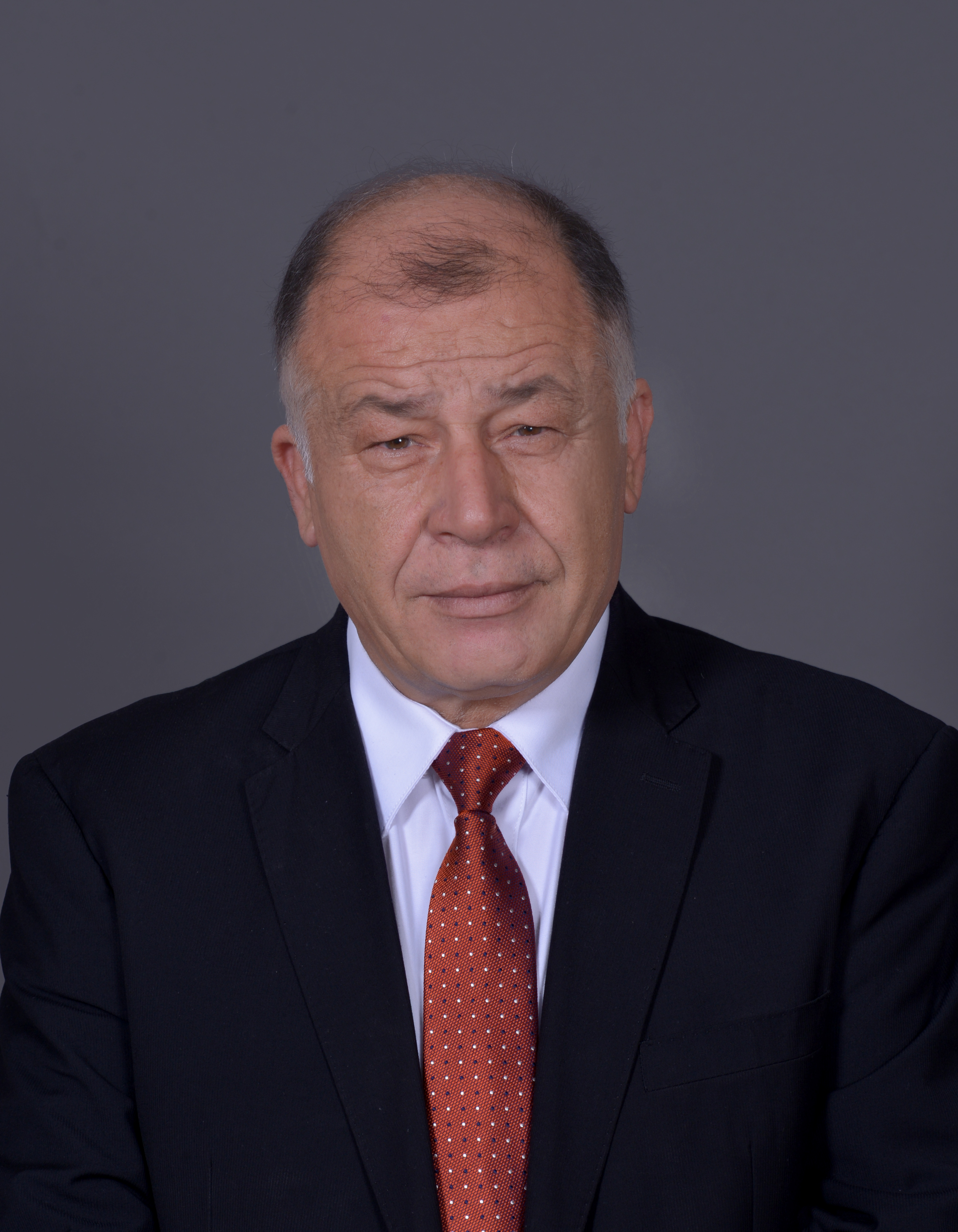
- Jalloul in 2018

Minister of Education
- Prime Minister: Youssef Chahed

Néji Jalloul is a Tunisian politician. He served as Minister of Education in the cabinet of Prime Minister Habib Essid and he continued to serve in this position in the cabinet of Prime Minister Youssef Chahed.

He was a candidate in the 2019 Tunisian presidential election.
