= Sonia Toumia =

Tunisian politician

Sonia Toumia (born June 2, 1976) is a Tunisian politician who was a member of the constituent assembly from 23 October 2011 until it was dissolved on 26 October 2014. The representative of the Islamist party Ennahdha for the Monastir riding, she was known for her humorous interventions during plenary sessions.

== Early life and education ==
Toumia is a graduate of the Institute of Press and Information Sciences.

== Career ==
Toumia worked at the Ministry of Agriculture for ten years, as well as writing articles for the newspaper L'Agruculteur and other publications. In 2009, she became a member of the Democratic Constitutional Rally, but she said in 2013 that she was sacked because of her refusal to praise the regime.

After the 2011 revolution, Toumia joined Ennahdha and was on the list of candidates for the Monastir riding at the 2011 election. As a member of the constituent assembly, she became known for her humorous interventions during sessions. While many of her fellow female Islamist MPs only used classical Arabic, Toumia made comments in French, earning public mockery for her accent and lack of proficiency in the language, and leading to the party leaders asking her to stay away from the media. During the drafting of the new constitution, Toumia was indignant when lawyers described the draft as a step backward for women, arguing that it had been misunderstood.

On 8 August 2014, Toumia announced that she had been removed from Ennahdha's lists for the forthcoming election saying that her "only wrong was her frankness, her courage and her imprint on the National Constituent Assembly." As of 2016, she was working for the Ministry of Agriculture, and argued that she and four colleagues had not been promoted due to animosity toward her.

== Personal life ==
Toumia is married and has three daughters. She is a Muslim and wears a hijab. In 2016, her brother, Sofiene Ben Toumia, was sentenced to 12 years in imprisonment for his role in recruiting young people to join terrorist groups.
