= Saoussen =

Saoussen may refer to:

- Saoussen Boudiaf (born 1993), French-Algerian fencer
- Saoussen Mabrouk, Tunisian politician

== See also ==
- Saussens, France
- Saussenac, France
