= Sayida Ounissi =

Tunisian politician (born 1987)

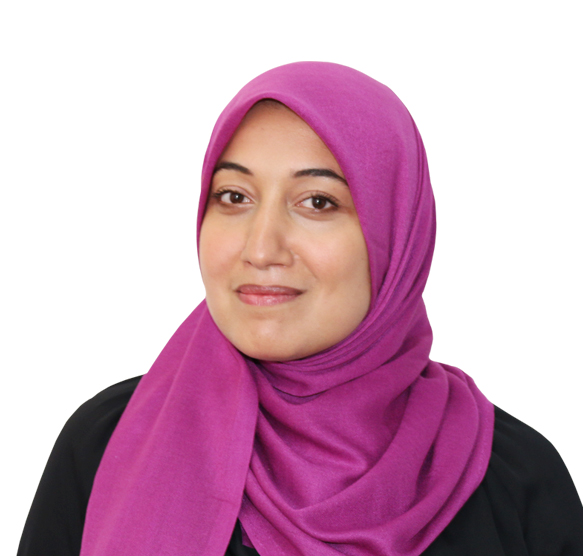

Member of the Assembly of the Representatives of the People for France Nord
- In office 26 October 2014 – 25 June 2021

Personal details
- Born: 3 February 1987 (age 39) Tunis, Tunisia
- Party: Ennahdha
- Education: Sorbonne University

Sayida Ounissi (born 3 February 1987) is a Tunisian former politician who represented the party of Ennahdha. She was Secretary of State for Vocational Training from 2016 to 2018 and Minister for Employment and Vocational Training from 2018 until the coup and dissolution of parliament by Kais Saied in June 2021.

== Early life and education ==
Ounissi was born in Tunis on 3 February 1987. She has one sister and three brothers. Her father was an Islamist imam, and left Tunisia in 1993 to escape President Zine El Abidine Ben Ali's regime. The family were smuggled to Algeria before joining him in France.

Ounissi attended the Petet Val secondary school in Sucy-en-Brie in Paris. She graduated from the Sorbonne University with a degree in history and political science in 2008 and with a master's degree in economic and social development in 2011. She began doctoral studies in political science in 2011. Her thesis title is "The implementation of social policies and the coercive role of the state."

== Career ==
Ounissi returned to Tunisia in 2011 after the fall of Ben Ali, working as an intern at the African Development Bank. She was a researcher at the Research Institute on Contemporary Maghreb from 2012 to 2014. She was also active in a public policy analysis centre called the Jasmine Foundation. She served as Vice President of the European NGO Young Muslims of Europe.

Ounissi was elected to the Assembly of the Representatives of the People on 26 October 2014 as a member of the Ennahdha representing the constituency of France Nord, an overseas constituency for members of the Tunisian diaspora in France. She was the youngest Ennahda candidate and became one of the youngest members of parliament. She sat on the Committees of Finance, Planning and Development and of Martyrs and Wounded of the Revolution. During the Bardo National Museum attack on 18 March 2015, she was tweeting live updates detailing the panic and evacuation.

On 20 August 2016, Ounissi was appointed to the Executive Board as Secretary of State for Vocational Training in charge of private initiative in the coalition government of Prime Minister Youssef Chahed and as international spokesperson.

On 5 November 2018, Ounissi was promoted to Minister for Employment and Vocational Training. She continued to serve in the Assembly until its suspension and dissolution by Kais Saied in 2021. She has opposed the policies of Saied, joining demonstrations of the National Salvation Front created by Ahmed Najib Chebbi. In September 2021, she hosted a delegation from the American Congress, but in 2022 said she was no longer allowed to leave Tunisian territory.

As of 2022 Ounissi was a consultant in public affairs and politics in the MENA region.

== Awards and honours ==
- 2018 One Young World Politician of the Year

== Personal life ==
Ounissi is an Islamist and wears a hijab. She also considers herself a feminist. She attended the El-Fath mosque until the Salafists took possession of it. She is fluent in both English and French. She became engaged to marry in August 2016.

== Publications ==
- Ounissi, Saida (12 February 2013). "Tunisie: le torchon brûle entre Paris et Tunis". Le Huffington Post (in French).
- Marks, Monica; Ounissi, Sayida (23 March 2016). Ennahda from within: Islamists or "Muslim Democrats"? A conversation (Report). Brookings Institution.
- Ounissi, Sayida; Ejammali, Nafouel (6 July 2016). "Democracy and Islam Go Together". Berlin Policy Journal. July/August 2016.
- Ounissi, Saida (1 September 2022). "Tunisia's Parliament: A Series of Post-Revolution Frustrations". Arab Reform Initiative.
