= Anouar Marzouki =

Tunisian politician

Second Deputy Speaker of the Assembly of the Representatives of the People
- Incumbent
- Assumed office 13 March 2023

Anouar Marzouki is a Tunisian politician. On 13 March 2023, he was appointed Second Deputy Speaker of the Assembly of the Representatives of the People.
