= Néziha Labidi =

Tunisian politician

Neziha Labidi
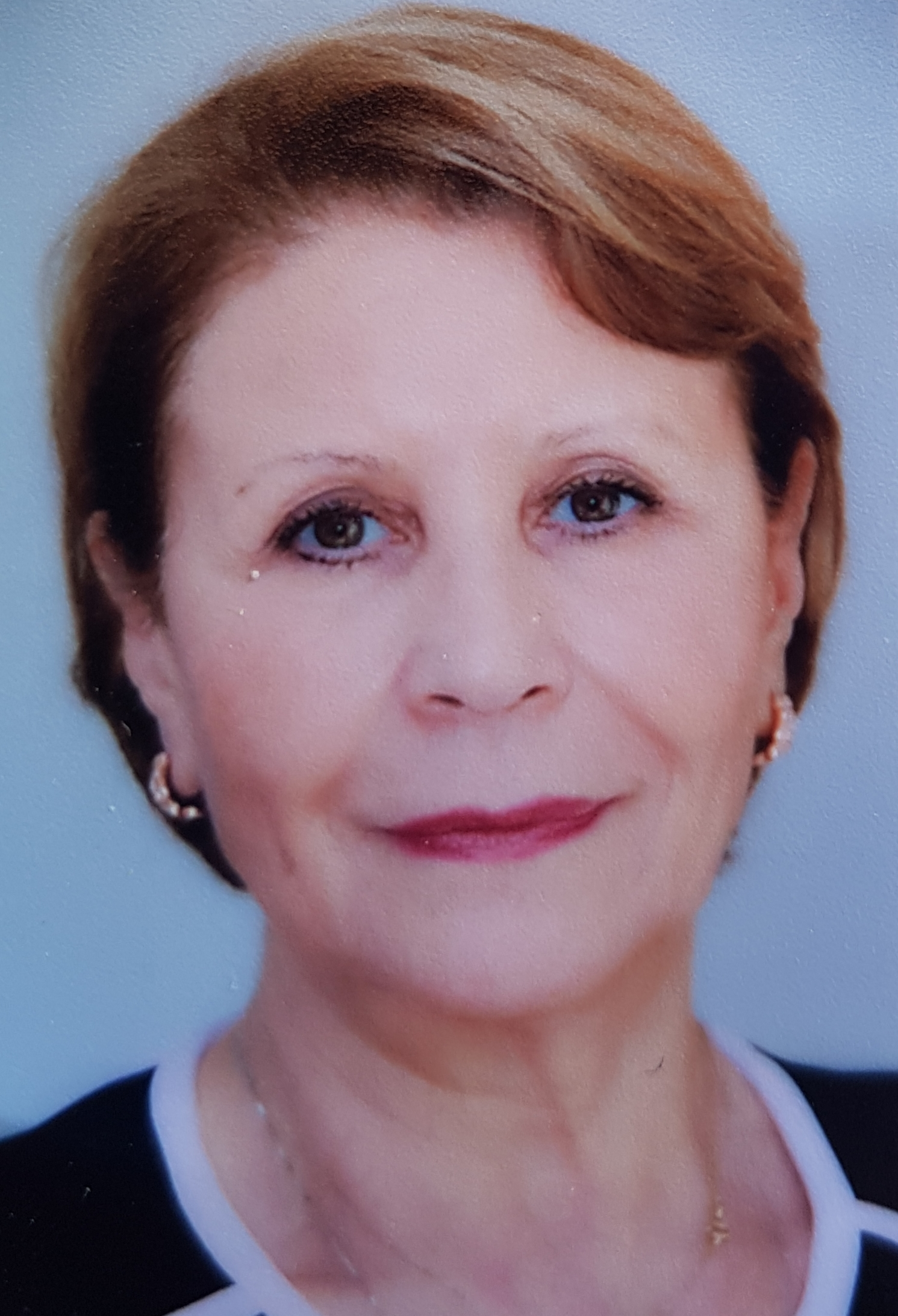
- Neziha Labidi in 2019

Minister of Women, Family and Children
- Prime Minister: Youssef Chahed

Neziha Labidi is a Tunisian politician. She served as Minister of Women, Family and Children in the cabinet of Prime Minister Youssef Chahed.

She graduated at University of Paris 1 Pantheon-Sorbonne in 1979.
