= 2019 Tunis bombings =

2019 bombings in Tunis, Tunisia

- Part of Islamic State insurgency in Tunisia
- 2019 Tunis bombings (Tunisia)
- Location: 36°48′25″N 10°9′2″E; Tunis, Tunisia
- Date: 27 June 2019
- Target: Soldiers; military personnel
- Attack type: Suicide bombings
- Weapon: Bomb
- Deaths: 2 (+2)
- Injuries: 8
- Perpetrator: Islamic State

The 2019 Tunis bombings occurred on 27 June 2019, when two suicide bombers detonated their explosives in two areas of Tunis, Tunisia, killing a police officer and wounding nine other people. The Islamic State claimed responsibility.

== Attack ==
The first suicide bombing happened near the French embassy on Charles de Gaulle street in Tunis. The attacker targeted a police patrol killing one officer and injuring four including another officer and three civilians. The second attack happened when the bomber blew up at a national guard base in al-Qarjani district of Tunis.

Later in that day, the Islamic State claimed responsibility. The attack took place the same day Beji Caid Essebsi was taken to the hospital in critical condition for a serious health condition, and a day after a four year anniversary of a mass shooting attack at two Sousse hotels.

== Security measures ==
As a result of these attacks, on 5 July 2019, Tunisian Prime Minister Youssef Chahed banned the wearing of the niqab – a full-face veil – in public institutions with immediate effect, citing security reasons. The decision came at a time of heightened security in the country. The attack was the third such incident within a week and came at the peak of tourist season as Tunisia prepared for an autumn parliamentary election.
