= Larbi Ben Salah Abid =

Tunisian politician

Larbi Ben Salah Abid العربي بن صالح عبيد
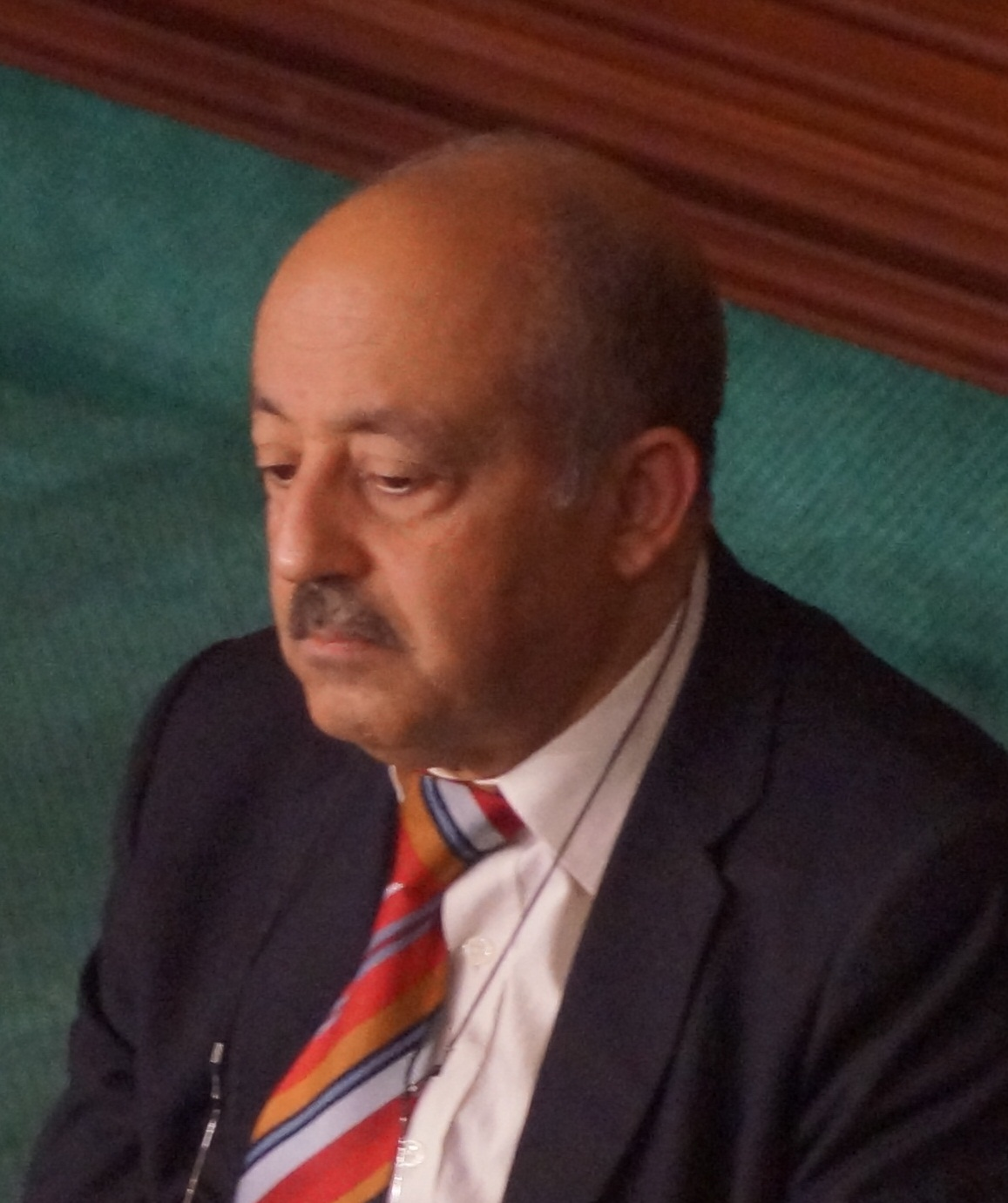
- President: Mustapha Ben Jaafar
- Preceded by: Habib Essid
- Succeeded by: Faouzia Ben Fodha

Personal details
- Born: June 30, 1953 (age 71); Tunis, Tunisia
- Occupation: Lawyer

Larbi Ben Salah Abid (Arabic: العربي بن صالح عبيد; born June 30, 1953, in Korba) is a Tunisian politician, he was second vice-president of the Constituent assembly between 2011 and 2014.

== Biography ==
He obtained his Bachelor of Arts in 1974 from Carthage Présidence Lyceum, a Masters in Private Law in 1981 and the Certificate of aptitude for the profession of Lawyer, before starting his professional career in the insurance sector, before joining the legal profession after five years. He was also a member of the National Bar Association in Tunisia from 2001 to 2004.

He has been a member of the Tunisian Human Rights League and the National Council for Liberties in Tunisia since their creation.

== Personal life ==
Laribi Ben Salah Abid is married and has three children.
