= Latifa Lakhdar =

Tunisian historian and politician

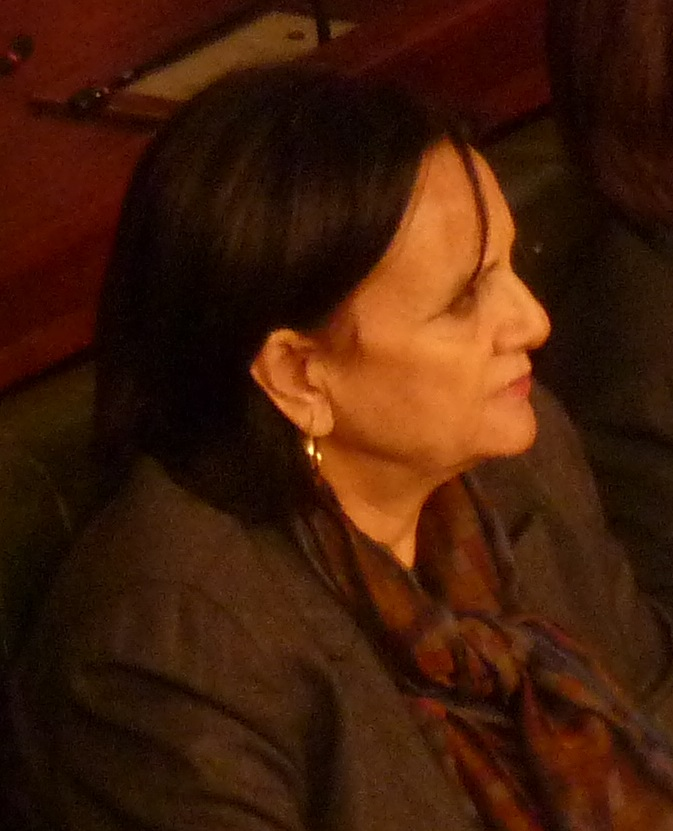
Lakhdar in 2015

Latifa Lakhdar (born 1 February 1956) is a Tunisian historian and politician who was Minister of Culture from February 2015 until January 2016.

== Early life and education ==
Lakhdar was born in Zarzis on 1 February 1956. She was a student of Mohamed Arkoun at the Sorbonne in Paris.

== Career ==
Lakhdar was Professor of Contemporary History at University of Ez-Zitouna from 1991 to 1999 and at the University of Tunis from 2000 to 2015.

Lakhdar is an expert in Islamic thought and has published several books in Arabic and French, notably on the condition of women in Islamic societies. She is a women's rights activist and secularist. She has argued that Islamic fundamentalism, including Islamic terrorism, is part of Islamic orthodoxy, but that Islamic thought can be enlightened and liberal if it undergoes a "critical revolution". She argues that "The jihadist idea that religion should rule politics is a model that never existed."

=== Political career ===
Lakhdar is a founding member of the Association tunisienne des femmes démocrates. In 2011, she was elected vice-president of the Higher Authority for Realisation of the Objectives of the Revolution, Political Reform and Democratic Transition.

On 6 February 2015, Lakhdar was appointed Minister of Culture and Heritage Preservation, as an independent, in the government of Prime Minister Habib Essid. She was in communication with museum staff during the Bardo National Museum attack on 18 March 2015 and later unveiled a memorial at the site.

On 12 February 2016, Lakhdar was made a Commander of the Order of the Republic by President Béji Caïd Essebsi for her service.

== Publications ==
=== Books ===
- Lakhdar, Latifa (1994). Confraternity Islam and the national question in colonial Tunisia (in French). Ceres.
- Lakhdar, Latifa (2002). The woman according to al-Ijma. Ceres.
- Lakhdar, Latifa (2007). Women in the Mirror of Islamic Orthodoxy (in French). Editions de l'Aube.
- Lakhdar, Latifa (2013). What will tomorrow be done? (in French).
- Lakhdar, Latifa (2020). Une révolution et son contraire (in French). Nirvana.

=== Articles ===
- Lakhdar, Latifa (2001). "Orthodoxy and Fundamentalism: The Obstacles to a Modern Muslim Mindset". Il Regno.
- Lakhdar, Latifa (2003). "Les discours zitouniens, 1904–1932: entre la "la reproduction quasi-parfaite" et la "reproduction réinterprétatrice". Actes du XIe Colloque Internationale (in French). Tunis: Mannoube.
- Lakhdar, Latifa (2009). "Approche critique de las pensée islamique orthodoxe: contraintes et espoirs d'un chantier de recherche". In Pierre-Robert Baduel (ed.). Chantiers et défis de la recherche sur le Maghreb contemporain (in French). KARTHALA editions. pp. 571–588. ISBN 9782811101633.
