= Hédi Majdoub =

Tunisian politician

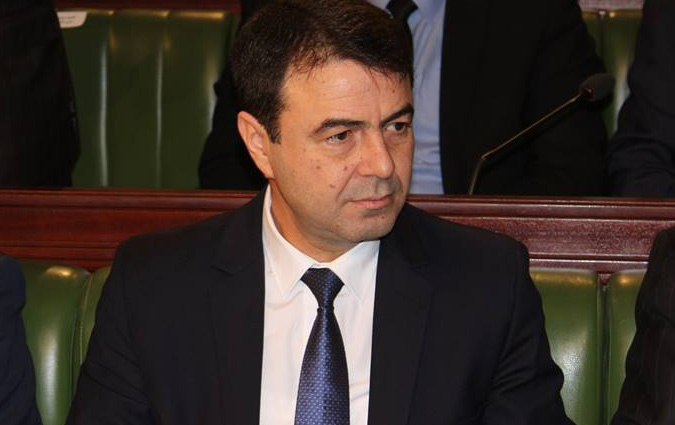

Minister of the Interior
- Prime Minister: Youssef Chahed

Personal details
- Born: 1 December 1969 (age 56)

Hédi Majdoub (born 1 December 1969) is a Tunisian politician. He served as Minister of the Interior in the cabinet of Prime Minister Youssef Chahed.
