= National Front for Salvation (Tunisia) =

Tunisian political party

National Front for Salvation الجبهة الوطنية للانقاذ
- President: Touhami Abdouli
- Assembly of the Representatives of the People: 0 / 217

Website
- www.mouvementnational.com

The National Front for Salvation (Arabic: الجبهة الوطنية للانقاذ al-Jibha al-Waṭanīya lil-Inqādh), is a Tunisian political coalition of different political parties the largest party in the coalition is the Tunisian National Movement . Its president and co-founder Touhami Abdouli won a seat in the district of Sidi Bouzid in the parliamentary election of 2014. The coalition ceased to exist after 3 months.
