= Mohamed Salah Arfaoui =

Tunisian politician and civil engineer (1956–2026)

- محمد صالح العرفاوي

Minister of Equipment, Housing and Spatial Planning
- In office 6 February 2015 – 14 November 2018
- President: Beji Caid Essebsi
- Prime Minister: Habib Essid; Youssef Chahed
- Preceded by: Hédi Larbi
- Succeeded by: Noureddine Selmi

Personal details
- Born: 11 January 1956 Bizerte, French protectorate of Tunisia
- Died: 18 September 2026 (aged 70)
- Party: Independent
- Education: National Engineering School of Tunis; Institut de défense nationale
- Occupation: Civil engineer

Mohamed Salah Arfaoui (Arabic: محمد صالح العرفاوي; 11 January 1956 – 18 September 2026) was a Tunisian politician and civil engineer who was an independent.

A native of Bizerte, he graduated from the National Engineering School of Tunis and the Institut de défense nationale. A longtime employee of the Ministry of Equipment, he oversaw much of the planning for the 2001 Mediterranean Games. He also became CEO of the Agence de réhabilitation et de rénovation urbaine in 2008. He became Minister of Equipment, Housing and Spatial Planning under Prime Minister Habib Essid on 6 February 2015. He was retained by Youssef Chahed until 14 November 2018, when he became Chahed's chief advisor.

Arfaoui died on 18 September 2026, at the age of 70.
