= 2014 Tunisian parliamentary election =

- 26 October 2014

All 217 seats to the Assembly of the Representatives of the People 109 seats needed for a majority
- Turnout: 67.7%
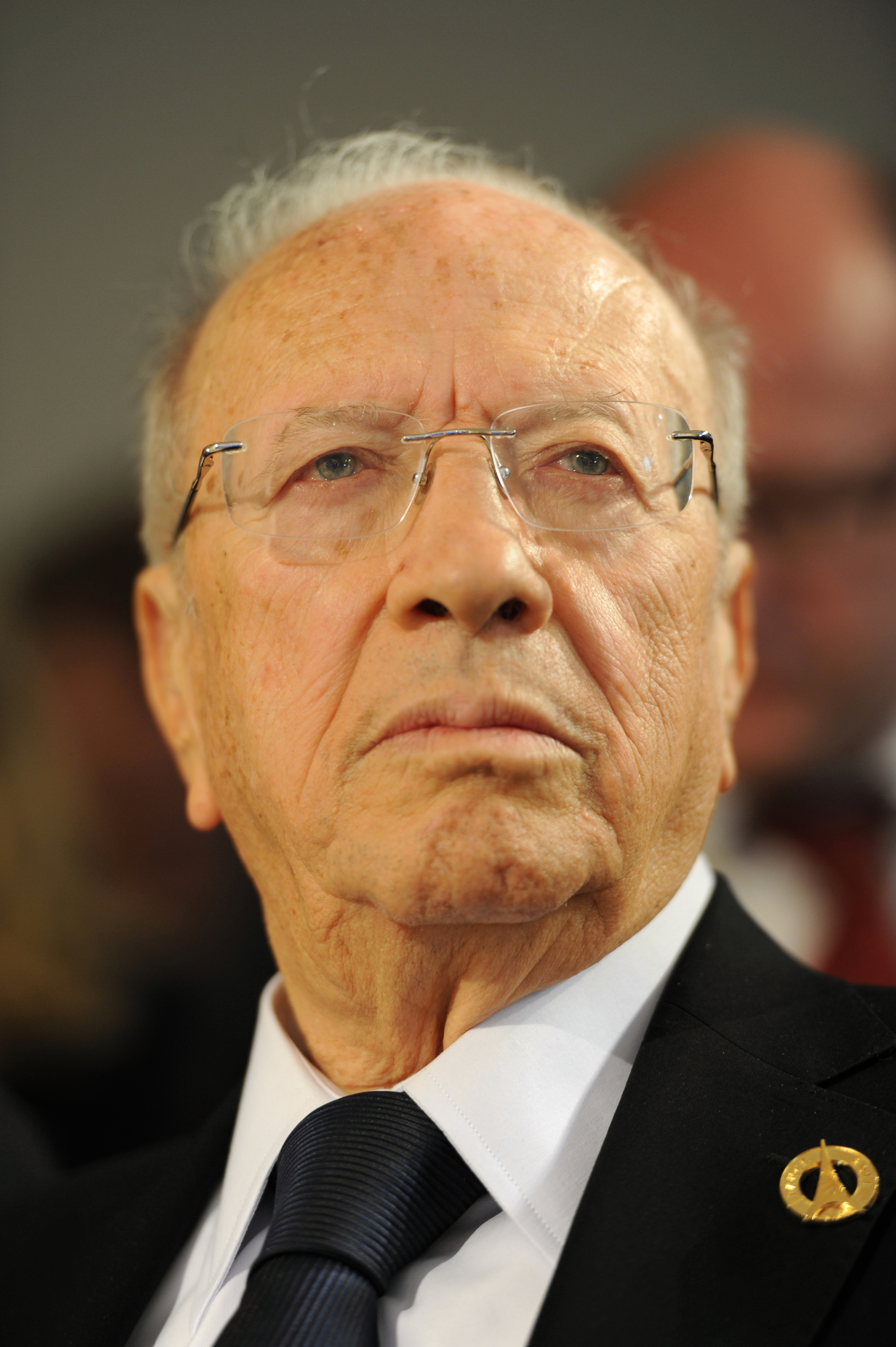

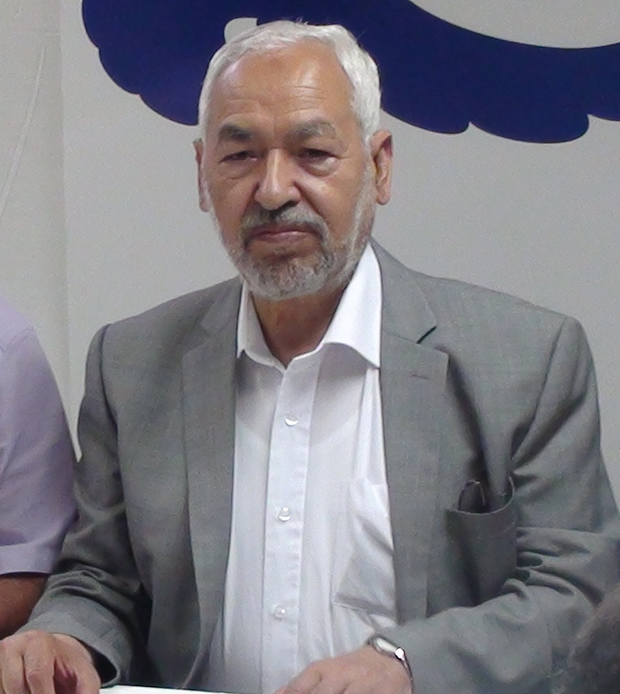

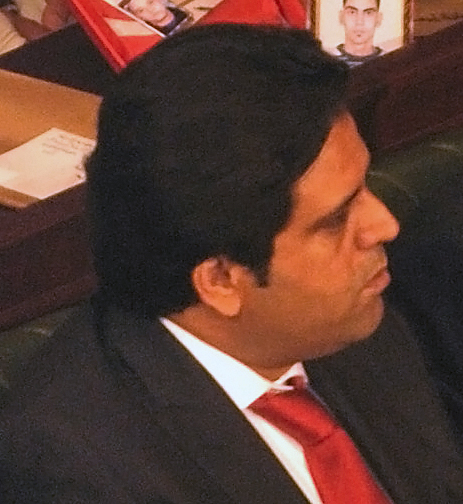

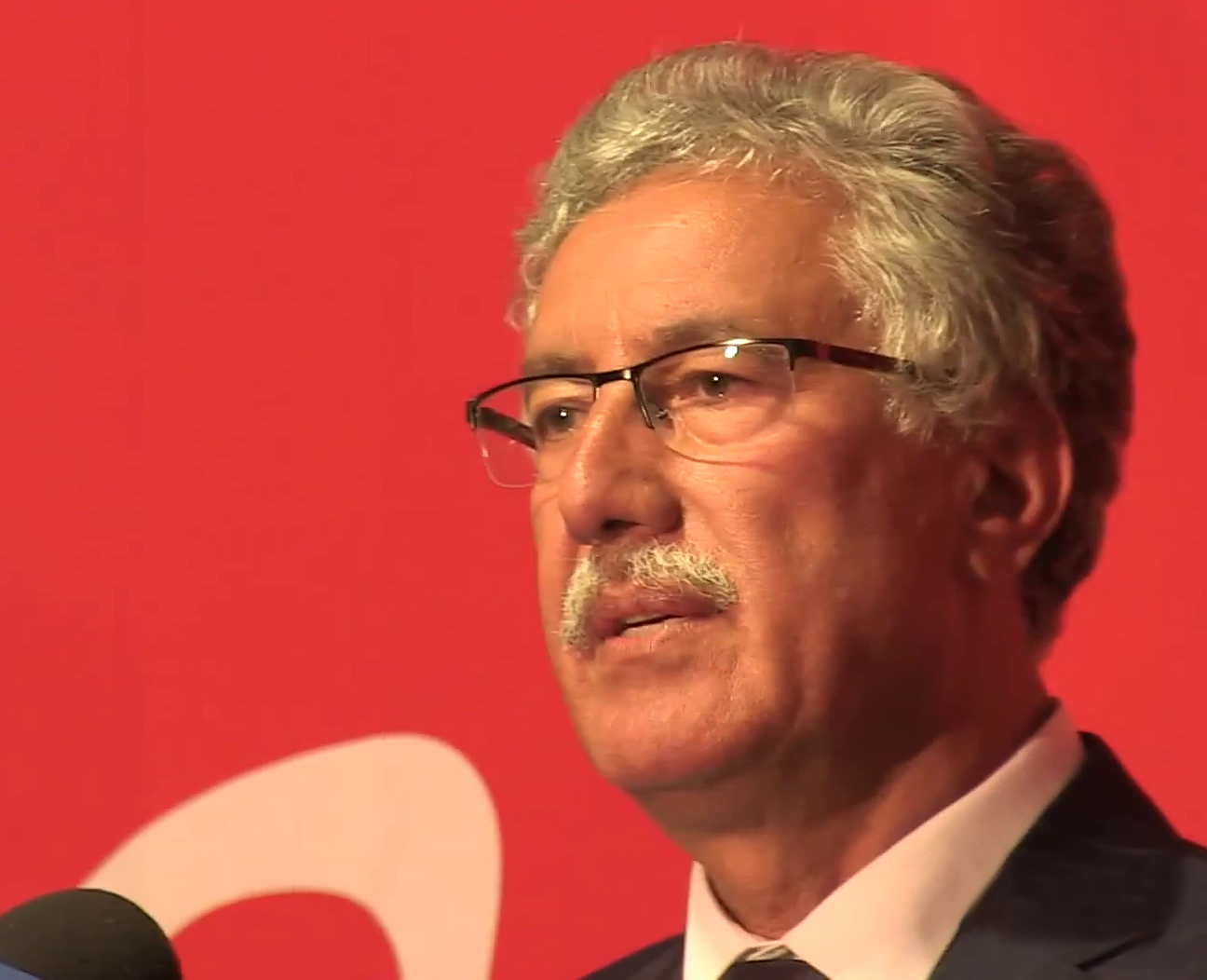

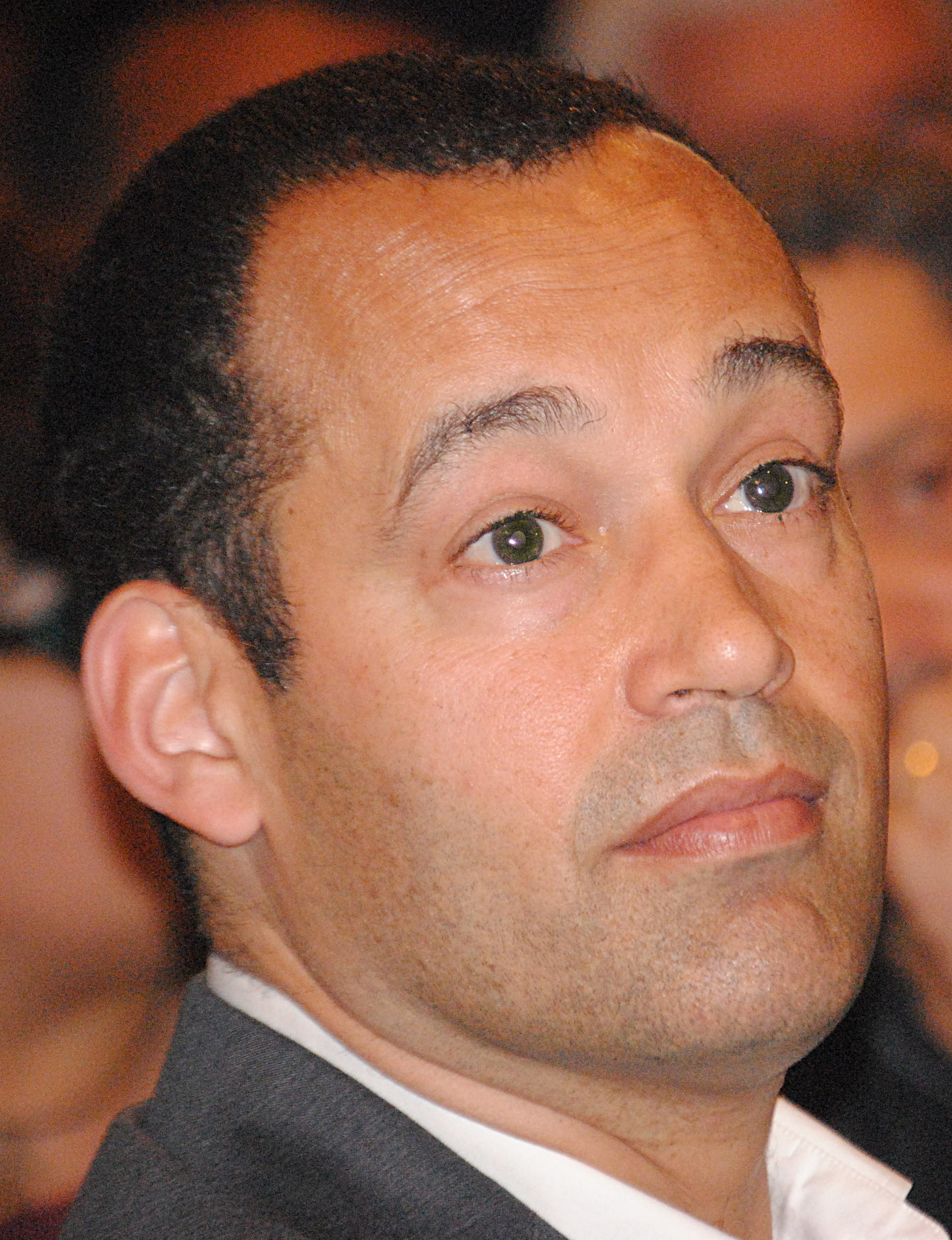

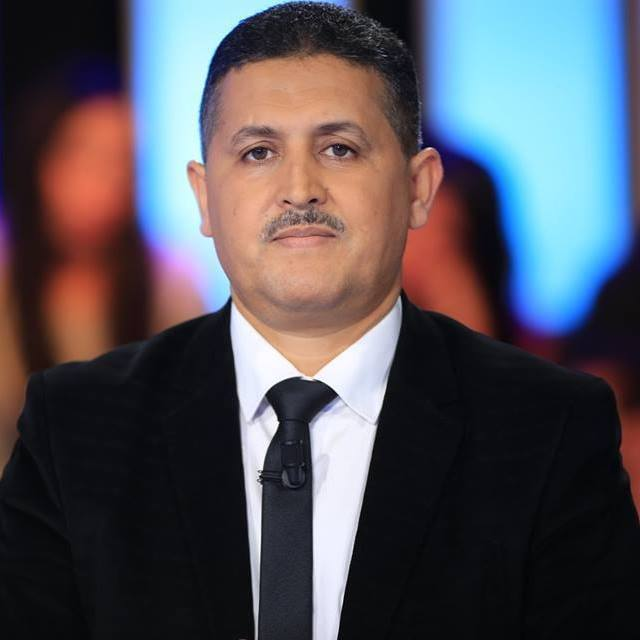
	First party	Second party	Third party
Leader	Béji Caïd Essebsi	Rached Ghannouchi	Slim Riahi
Party	Nidaa Tounes	Ennahda	UPL
Last election	–	37.04%, 89 seats	1.26%, 1 seat
Seats won	86	69	16
Seat change	New	▼20	▲15
Popular vote	1,279,941	947,238	140,873
Percentage	37.56%	27.80%	4.13%
	Fourth party	Fifth party	Sixth party
Leader	Hamma Hammami	Yassine Brahim	Imed Daimi
Party	Popular Front	Afek Tounes	CPR
Last election	–	1.89%, 4 seats	8.71%, 29 seats
Seats won	15	8	4
Seat change	New	▲4	▼25
Popular vote	124,039	102,915	69,894
Percentage	3.64%	3.02%	2.05%
- Map showing the plurality of votes of the parties in each Tunisian governorate. Red voted for Nidaa Tounes and Blue voted for Ennahdha.
Prime Minister before election
Mehdi Jomaa
Independent
Prime Minister-designate
Habib Essid
Independent

Parliamentary elections were held in Tunisia on 26 October 2014. Campaigning started on 4 October 2014. They were the first free regular legislative elections since independence in 1956, and the first elections held following the adoption of the new constitution in January 2014, which created a 217-seat Assembly of the Representatives of the People. According to preliminary results, Nidaa Tounes gained a plurality of votes, winning 85 seats in the 217-seat parliament, beating the Ennahda Movement (69 seats) and many smaller parties.

Presidential elections were held a month later on 23 November.

== Electoral system ==
The 217 members of the Assembly of the Representatives of the People were elected in 33 constituencies. There were 27 multi-member constituencies in Tunisia varying in size from four to ten seats and electing a total of 199. There were also six overseas constituencies electing a total of 18 seats: two constituencies in France electing five seats each, one three-seat constituency in Italy, a single-member constituency in Germany, a two-member constituency covering the rest of Europe and the Americas, and a two-member constituency covering the Arab world and the rest of the world. Seats were elected by party-list proportional representation, using the largest remainder method.

== Opinion polls ==
Poll results are listed in the table below in chronological order, showing the most recent polls last.

Poll list
Poll source	Date(s) administered	Sample size	Undecided	Aridha/ al-Mahaba	CPR	Ennahda	Ettakatol	PT/FP	PDP/PR	Nidaa Tounes	Other
2011 election	Oct 23, 2011	51.97% turnout	–	6.74%	8.71%	37.04%	7.03%	1.57%	3.94%	–	34.97%
I Watch	Dec 2011	15,000	–	6%	25%	52%	–	–	–	–	–
I Watch	Jan 9–14, 2012	15,000	–	5%	22%	56%	8%	–	9%	–	–
I Watch	Feb 2012	15,000	–	–	22%	52%	9%	–	11%	–	–
SIGMA	Feb 28 – Mar 2, 2012	1002	49.1%	1.3%	9.1%	28.2%	5.2%	1.0%	2.2%	–	4.0%
I Watch	Mar 2012	16,181	–	5th	22%	51%	4th	–	3rd	–	–
FSSA	May 2012	2,430	45%	4.1%	4.3%	29.0%	–	–	–	–	–
SIGMA	May 2012	1000	–	–	6.2%	37.5%	7.5%	–	–	–	–
I Watch	Apr 2012	15,000	–	9%	20%	48%	10%	–	13%	–	–
Amilkar News	Jun 2012	?	–	?	?	13%	?	8%	13%	50%	16%
Emrhod	Jun 18–22, 2012	960	41.6%	1.5%	7.9%	25.5%	4.0%	2.6%	4.2%	5.2%	7.5%
3C Etudes	Sep 2012	?	?	5.4%	6.5%	30.4%	4.1%	5.6%	7.6%	20.8%	?
FSSA	Aug 29 – Sep 7, 2012	1280	55.2%	1.4%	2.1%	22.3%	1.7%	4.6%	1.8%	7.9%	?
IRI	Oct 2012	?	41%	–	6%	27%	6%	3%	–	6%	11%
3C Etudes	Oct 2012	1665	?	5.6%	5.0%	30.9%	3.4%	5.6%	5.8%	28.1%	?
SIGMA	Nov 2012	?	?	3.4%	12.4%	36.1%	4.1%	5.3%	2.2%	29.1%	?
3C Etudes	Nov 2012	1648	?	4.7%	4.6%	31.4%	3.8%	6.9%	5.4%	29.6%	?
Emrhod	Dec 2012	1200	?	2.5%	3.8%	20.4%	1.8%	5.3%	0.7%	15.8%	?
SIGMA	Dec 18–21, 2012	1892	?	0.7%	6.8%	41.4%	1.9%	7.8%	3.1%	36.0%	2.3%
3C Etudes	Dec 2012	1692	?	5.1%	4.7%	33.9%	3.4%	9.4%	6%	28.4%	9.3%
3C Etudes	Jan 2013	1652	?	3.5%	3.5%	33.0%	2.9%	7.9%	5.6%	33.1%	10.5%
SIGMA	Feb 2013	1715	?	1.5%	3.5%	37.7%	1.7%	13.3%	3.1%	34.6%	4.4%
3C Etudes	Feb 2013	1347	?	5.9%	3.1%	29.4%	2.3%	12.2%	7.1%	29.8%	?
Emrhod	Feb 2013	1060	22.9% (none); 16.8% (und.)	1.9%	2.4%	19.5%	1.0%	7.5%	2.4%	18.7%	6.9%
3C Etudes	Mar 2013	1609	38.5%	6.5%	1.7%	30.9%	1.5%	9.2%	6.4%	28.7%	?
Emrhod	Mar 2013	1065	26.2% (none); 8.5% (und.)	2.1%	1.2%	20.0%	1.2%	7.7%	3.5%	23.5%	?
3C Etudes	Apr 2013	1695	44%	5.7%	2.1%	30.1%	1.4%	11%	5.8%	32.3%	?
FSSA	Apr 2013	1210	11.7% (none); 35% (und.)	2.6%	1.5%	21.3%	1.3%	5.0%	2.2%	17.5%	?
Emrhod	Apr 2013	?	25.5% (none); 13.5% (und.)	1.8%	2.2%	16.4%	2.0%	5.4%	2.9%	21.2%	?
SIGMA	May, 2013	?	?	?	2.2%	32.6%	2.4%	8.9%	4.1%	44.7%	?
3C Etudes	May 2013	1695	?	4.7%	2.1%	29.4%	1.8%	11.6%	5.4%	33.8%	?
Sigma	May 2013	2777	?	0.5%	1.1%	17.3%	1.2%	4.5%	2.1%	22.6%	?
Emrhod	May 2013	1600	?	3.5%	2%	14%	1.7%	8%	2.1%	20.4%	?
Istis	June 2013	?	?	?	2.1%	34%	1%	8.1%	1%	32.7%	17%
Emrhod	June 2013	1067	15.1% (don't know); 17.9% (none); 35.1% (und.)	?	2.1%	19.4%	1.8%	7%	2%	36.6%	?
3C Etudes	July 2013	944	43%	5.6%	1.9%	29.7%	1.3%	10.2%	4.2%	33.6%	?
Sigma	Aug 2013	1724	55%	1.3%	2.5%	33.7%	2.0%	9.4%	3.1%	42.3%	5.7%
3C Etudes	Aug 2013	1249	43%	5.2%	?	30.6%	?	9.7%	3.5%	33.9%	?
Emrhod	Sep 2013	?	?	?	2.0%	18.4%	3.4%	4.6%	1.4%	24.4%	?
Sigma	Oct 2013	?	49.6%	1.9%	2.9%	31.2%	2.5%	11.9%	1.5%	42.5%	?
3C Etudes	Oct 2013	1318	39.3%	5.2%	?	30.4%	?	10.3%	3.9%	30.1%	?
Emrhod	Nov 2013	1900	?	?	?	18.0%	?	6.3%	?	27.6%	?
3C Etudes	Nov 2013	1658	?	3.5%	?	31.4%	?	10.6%	2.1%	29.1%	?
Sigma	Dec 2013	?	48.1%	2.4%	3.4%	28.6%	1.6%	6.3%	4.5%	40.0%	?
3C Etudes	Dec 2013	1681	?	2.2%	?	31.6%	?	10.0%	3.8%	27.2%	?
Emrhod	Jan 2014	?	?	?	?	16.4%	?	5.3%	1.8%	23.3%	?
Sigma	Jan 2014	11362	54.4%	1.3%	2.4%	34.6%	3.6%	7.1%	1.3%	41.6%	?
Emrhod	Feb 2014	1200	?	2.2%	2.1%	18.4%	1.9%	6.4%	1.4%	20.6%	?
Sigma	Feb 2014	1517	?	?	2.8%	33.1%	1.5%	3.8%	2.4%	52.3%	?
Emrhod	Mar 2014	1051	?	1.6%	2.4%	20.9%	2.4%	7.4%	2.4%	25.7%	?
Sigma	Apr 2014	1636	62.9% (und. + abstain)	0.8%	2.6%	35.4%	1.8%	5.1%	1.6%	46.8%	4.9%
Sigma	May 2014	1013	?	1.0%	1.0%	28.7%	3.1%	5.1%	2.3%	50.5%	?
Sigma	May 2014 (II)	?	?	2.5	2.6%	24.0%	3.9%	6.2%	2.3%	41.3%	?
Emrhod	Jun 2014	?	?	?	?	14.0%	4.7%	3.9%	2.9%	17.1%	?
Sigma	Jun/Jul 2014	?	?	?	3.1%	21.7%	3.5%	7.3%	3.2%	45.1%	?
Source	Date	Sample size	Undecided	al-Mahaba	CPR	Ennahda	Ettakatol	FP	PR	Nidaa	Other

== Results ==
According to the final results released by the Independent High Authority for Elections, Nidaa Tounes took the lead in the election, winning 86 seats in the 217-seat parliament. Ennahda Movement came second with 69 seats losing 16 seats compared to 2011 elections. The biggest losers were CPR of Moncef Marzouki and Democratic Forum for Labour and Liberties who were members of a coalition government formed with Ennahda Movement following 2011 elections, and opposition party Current of Love (formerly Aridha Chaabia). On the other hand, there was a noticeable emergence of smaller parties like the UPL of businessman Slim Riahi with 16 seats, Popular Front with 15 seats and Afek Tounes with 8 seats.

Initially, the Elections Authority decided to sanction Nidaa Tounes in Kasserine electoral district by withdrawing one seat following reported irregularities conducted by partisans. However, the decision was overturned by the administrative court after an appeal by Nidaa Tounes. The ruling took away the only seat obtained by Democratic Forum for Labour and Liberties leaving the party with no presence in parliament.

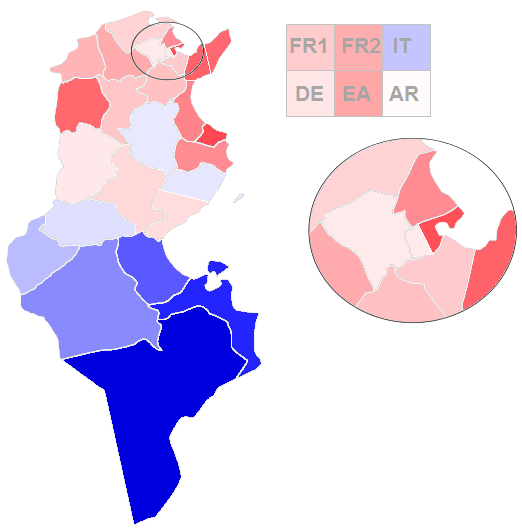
Results of the Tunisian parliamentary election 2014 by district.

Party	Votes	%	Seats	+/–
Nidaa Tounes	1,279,941	37.56	86	New
Ennahda Movement	947,238	27.80	69	−20
Free Patriotic Union	140,873	4.13	16	+15
Popular Front	124,039	3.64	15	+11
Afek Tounes	102,915	3.02	8	+5
Congress for the Republic	69,894	2.05	4	−25
Democratic Current	66,396	1.95	3	New
Republican Party	54,562	1.60	1	−15
People's Movement	45,839	1.35	3	+1
National Destourian Initiative	45,597	1.34	3	−2
Current of Love	40,437	1.19	2	−24
Democratic Alliance Party	38,493	1.13	1	New
Union for Tunisia	25,102	0.74	0	New
Democratic Forum for Labour and Liberties	22,956	0.67	0	–20
Wafa Movement	21,392	0.63	0	New
Destourian Movement Party	11,403	0.33	0	New
Socialist Party	7,851	0.23	0	New
Safety Party	7,850	0.23	0	New
Party of the Voice of the Tunisian People	7,849	0.23	0	New
Tunisian Movement Party	7,185	0.21	0	New
Movement of Socialist Democrats	7,080	0.21	0	–2
Party of Glory	6,258	0.18	0	New
National Front for Salvation	5,710	0.17	1	New
List of the Rehabilitation	5,589	0.16	1	New
Tunisian National Front Party	5,500	0.16	0	New
Party of Tomorrow	5,310	0.16	0	New
For the Glory of el-Djerid	5,111	0.15	1	New
Popular Petition Party	5,023	0.15	0	New
National Construction Party	4,996	0.15	0	New
People Want Party	4,802	0.14	0	New
Tunisian Democratic Youth Federation	4,636	0.14	0	New
Reform and Development Party	4,400	0.13	0	New
Unity Party	4,026	0.12	0	New
Tunisia for All Party	3,995	0.12	0	New
Social Democratic Path	3,942	0.12	1	New
Mighty Tunisia	3,838	0.11	0	New
Tunisian Labour Party	3,837	0.11	0	New
Carthage's Call Party	3,771	0.11	0	New
Fulfilling the Project of the Martyr	3,618	0.11	0	New
Independent Departure Party	3,526	0.10	0	New
Farmers' Voice Party	3,515	0.10	1	New
Other parties	241,572	7.09	1	–
Total	3,407,867	100.00	217	0
Registered voters/turnout	5,285,136	–		
Source: CLEA (results) National Democratic Institute (electorate) European Parliament

== Reactions ==
=== Domestic ===
Ennahda's Lotfi Zitoun said the party had "accepted this result and congratulate[s] the winner."

=== International ===
The result was hailed internationally for its democratic viability as the only one of the major Arab Spring uprisings, including Libya and Egypt, that is not convulsed by instability and turmoil.

In the United States, President Barack Obama hailed the free, fair and non-violent elections as a "milestone," while Secretary of State John Kerry said it was an example of "why Tunisia remains a beacon of hope, not only to the Tunisian people, but to the region and the world."

=== Other ===
Comparisons were also drawn to holding Tunisia as a model for Lebanon amidst its own turmoil.

== Government formation ==
With Nidaa Tounes having won a plurality it had the right to name a prime minister and form a government in coalition. Beji Caid Essebsi said it was too early to talk of a coalition government – including one with Ennahda. Instead he said the 2014 Tunisian presidential election will give direction to the formation of a new government.

On 5 January 2015, Nidaa Tounes nominated independent Habib Essid as Prime Minister and asked him to form a new government. He was chosen over former trade unionist Taieb Baccouche "because he is independent and has experience in the areas of security and the economy," said the speaker of Congress, Mohamed Ennaceur. The nomination of a politician who had served under former autocratic president Zine el-Abidine Ben Ali however was widely criticized. Popular Front leader Hamma Hammami stated that with Essid as prime minister, "the real power" would rather be in the presidential palace.

On 23 January 2015, Essid surprisingly presented a minority cabinet including 10 ministers from Nidaa Tounes and three from the liberal Free Patriotic Union, after the other liberal power Afek Tounes was said to have abruptly pulled out of the coalition. Without Afek Tounes, the two parties could, however, only count on 102 of the 217 seats. Both Ennahda and the Popular Front announced to vote against the proposed government.

On 4 February 2015, Essid proposed a unity government consisting of independent politicians, ministers of Nidaa Tounes, the two liberal parties UPL and Afek Tounes, and a minister of the Islamist Ennahda. The next day, Essid's new proposal found a strong majority in the Assembly of the Representatives of the People, when 166 of the 217 legislators approved his new government.

The government lasted until new elections were held in October 2019; a new government formed in February 2020.
