= Saoussen Mabrouk =

Tunisian politician

First Deputy Speaker of the Assembly of the Representatives of the People
- Incumbent
- Assumed office 13 March 2023

Saoussen Mabrouk is a Tunisian politician. On 13 March 2023, she was appointed First Deputy Speaker of the Assembly of the Representatives of the People.
