= Constituent Assembly of Tunisia =

Tunisian parliament

National Constituent Assembly المجلس الوطني التأسيسي el-Mejlis el-Waṭanī et-Te'sīsī

Type
- Type: Unicameral parliament

History
- Founded: 23 October 2011
- Disbanded: 26 October 2014
- Preceded by: Chamber of Deputies
- Succeeded by: Assembly of the Representatives of the People

Leadership
- Speaker: Mustapha Ben Jafar, Ettakatol since 22 November 2011
- First Deputy Speaker: Meherzia Labidi Maïza, Ennahda since 22 November 2011
- Second Deputy Speaker: Larbi Ben Salah Abid, CPR since 22 November 2011

Structure
- Seats: 217
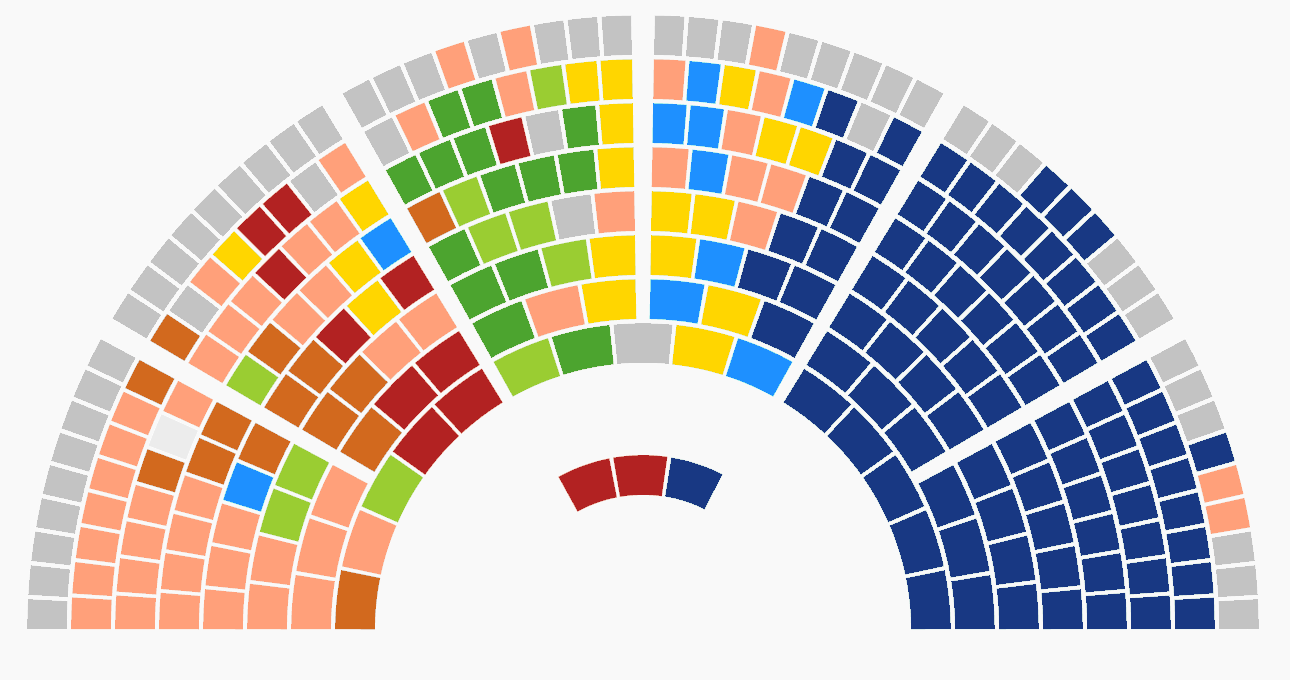
- Political groups: Ennahda (89) non-inscrit (53) Democratic Bloc (18) Congress for the Republic (16) Democratic Transition (13) Ettakatol (13) Democratic Alliance (12) Wafa Movement (10)

Elections
- Voting system: Proportional representation in multi-member constituency party-lists
- Last election: 23 October 2011

Meeting place
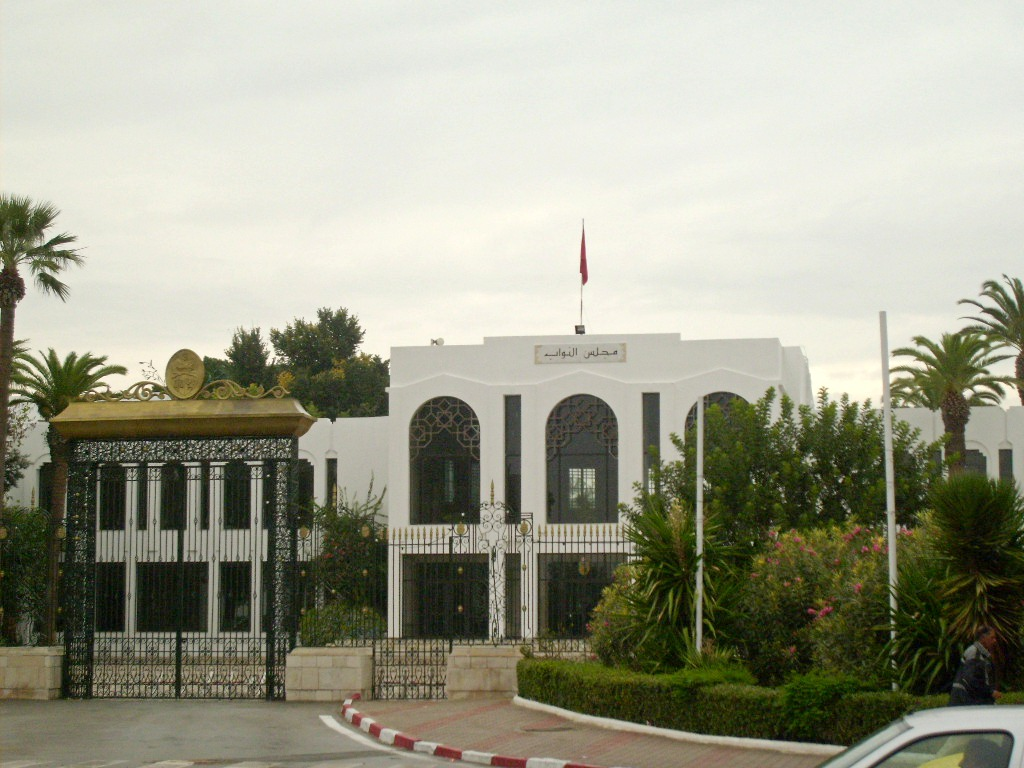
- Bardo Palace

Website
- www.anc.tn

The Constituent Assembly of Tunisia, or National Constituent Assembly (NCA) was the body in charge of devising a new Tunisian constitution for the era after the fall of President Zine El Abidine Ben Ali and his Constitutional Democratic Rally (RCD)–regime. Convoked after the election on 23 October 2011, the convention consisted of 217 lawmakers representing Tunisians living both in the country and abroad. A plurality of members came from the moderate Islamist Ennahda Movement. The Assembly held its first meeting on 22 November 2011, and was dissolved and replaced by the Assembly of the Representatives of the People on 26 October 2014.

== Convocation ==
Provisionally, a time of approximately one year was envisioned to develop the new constitution, although the convention itself was to determine its own schedule.

Before the first session of the NCA, the Ennahda, Congress for the Republic (CPR) and Ettakatol agreed to share the three highest posts in state. Accordingly, the parliament voted Mustapha Ben Jafar (Ettakatol) speaker of the NCA upon being convoked on 22 November. Meherzia Labidi (Ennahda) and Larbi Abid (CPR) were elected Deputy Speakers.

== Provisional constitution and presidential election ==
On 10 December 2011, the assembly adopted a provisional constitution (Law on the provisional organisation of public powers) According to articles VIII and IX of the document, the requirements for the eligibility as president are exclusive Tunisian nationality (excluding citizens with dual nationality), having Tunisian parentage, religious affiliation to Islam, and an age of 35 years or more. 141 delegates approved of the law, 37 voted against, and 39 abstained.

On 12 December 2011, the NCA elected the human rights activist and CPR leader Moncef Marzouki as the interim President of the Tunisian Republic. 153 delegates voted for him, three against, and 44 votes were blank. Blank votes were the result of a boycott from the opposition parties, who disagreed with the new "mini-constitution".

On 14 December, one day after his accession to office, Marzouki appointed Hamadi Jebali, the secretary-general of the Ennahda Movement as Prime Minister. Jebali presented his government on 20 December, and officially took office on 24 December.

2011 Tunisian presidential election results
Candidacy of Moncef Marzouki of the Congress for the Republic
Choice	Votes	%
For	153	75.7
Against	3	1.5
Blank	44	20.3
Abstentions	2	1.0
Total	202	100.0
Voter turnout	93.1	
Electorate	217	
Source: AFP

== Constitution drafting process ==
The actual process of drafting the new constitution started on 13 February 2012. The assembly established six committees, each in charge of one of the individual themes of the constitution. The first commission was responsible for the preamble and the general principles and amendments. Each of the committees consisted of 22 lawmakers and mirrored the relative strength of the political groups in the assembly. The most crucial question was the form of government. While the Islamist Ennahda movement favoured a parliamentary system, its secular coalition partners CPR and Ettakatol, as well as most of the minor opposition parties preferred a semi-presidential republic. The new Tunisian constitution was passed on 26 January 2014.

== Party standings ==
The party standings as of the election and as of 26 October 2014 were as follows:

Standings in the 2011 Tunisian National Constituent Assembly
Affiliation	Members	
Affiliation	2011 Election Results	As of 5 October 2014
Ennahda Movement	89	85
Congress for the Republic (CPR)	29	12
Democratic Forum for Labour and Liberties (FDTL)	20	12
Democratic Alliance Party^{8}	-	10
Social Democratic Path (VDS)^{10}	-	10
Republican Party (PR)^{7}	-	8
Popular Petition/Current of Love	26	7
Wafa Movement^{2}	-	6
Voice of the Tunisian People^{3}	-	6
Nidaa Tounes^{12}	-	6
El Amen Party^{3}	-	5
The Initiative (Almoubadara)	4	
Democratic Current^{2}	-	4
Movement of the Republic^{4}	-	4
Afek Tounes^{11}	4	3
Tunisian Workers' Communist Party (PTOL)/Workers' Party (PT)	3	
Patriotic Construction Party^{1}	-	3
People's Movement/Popular Current	2	
Free Patriotic Union (UPL)	1	2
Democratic Patriots' Movement (MOPAD)	1	
Maghrebin Liberal Party/Maghrebi Republican Party	1	
Progressive Struggle Party/Progressive People's Party	1	
Tunisian Movement for Freedom and Dignity	-	1
Tunisian National Front	-	1
Al Iklaa Party^{2}	-	1
Third Alternative^{5}	-	1
Reform and Development Party^{8}	-	1
Progressive Democratic Party (PDP)^{6}	16	–
Democratic Modernist Pole (PDM)^{9}	5	—
Movement of Socialist Democrats (MDS)	2	—
Democratic Social Nation Party	1	—
New Destour Party	1	—
Equity and Equality Party	1	—
Cultural Unionist Nation Party	1	—
Independent lists	8	17
Total members	217	

Note: ^{1}Split from Ennahda.

^{2}Split from CPR.
^{3}Mostly composed of former members of Popular Petition.
^{4}Split from Popular Petition.
^{5}Split from FDTL.
^{6}Merged into PR.
^{7}Merger of PDP, Afek Tounes, minor parties and independents.
^{8}Split from PDP.
^{9}Dissolved. Most members joined VDS.
^{10}Mostly composed of former members of PDM.
^{11}Merged into PR. Later revived.
^{12}Founded after the 2011 election; was joined by defectors from different parties.

== See also ==
- Politics of Tunisia
- List of legislatures by country
