= Progressive Democratic Party (Tunisia) =

Progressive Democratic Party الحزب الديمقراطي التقدمي
- French name: Parti démocrate progressiste
- Abbreviation: PDP
- Former secretaries-general: Ahmed Najib Chebbi (1983–2006); Maya Jribi (2006–2012)
- Founded: 1983; 43 years ago
- Legalized: 12 September 1988; 38 years ago
- Dissolved: 9 April 2012; 14 years ago
- Preceded by: Progressive Socialist Rally
- Merged into: Republican Party
- Ideology: Liberalism; Secularism

Website
- www.pdp.tn

The Progressive Democratic Party (Arabic: الحزب الديمقراطي التقدمي, al-Ḥizb ad-Dīmuqrāṭī at-Taqaddumī; French: Parti démocrate progressiste), also referred to by its acronym PDP, was a secular liberal political party in Tunisia.

== History and profile ==
The Progressive Democratic Party was founded under the name of Progressive Socialist Rally in 1983. It gained legal recognition on 12 September 1988 and was renamed Progressive Democratic Party in 2001. Under the rule of Ben Ali it was a legal opposition party, but it was subjected to political repression. After the Tunisian revolution it was one of the major left-leaning secular political forces. It was led by Ahmed Najib Chebbi and Maya Jribi. On 9 April 2012, it merged into the Republican Party.

The Progressive Democratic Party had a newspaper, Al-Mawqif.

== Under the Ben Ali rule ==
In its beginnings, the Progressive Socialist Rally (now PDP) gathered a broad range of currents from Marxists and pro-democracy activists to progressive Muslims. During the Ben Ali rule, Najib Chebbi and the PDP were harassed by the police for years, and verbally attacked by state-run media. After unsuccessfully participating in elections from 1989 to 1999, the party decided to boycott the elections of 2004 and 2009. Therefore, it was unrepresented in the Tunisian parliament. After the Ben Ali administration announced to force the party to move their headquarters from Tunis, its leaders Najib Chebbi and Maya Jribi engaged in a 20-day hunger strike, which earned the party attention and prompted the administration to revoke their decision.

== After the Tunisian revolution ==
Following the 2010–2011 Tunisian protests, shootings outside PDP's headquarters were reported on 16 January 2011. The next day, on 17 January, party leader Najib Chebbi, was named Regional Development Minister in the interim government. Ahead of the Constituent Assembly election, the PDP evolved into a main exponent of the centre-left secular camp and rival of the Islamist Ennahda Movement. In the run-up to the elections, the Progressive Democrats have received quite an amount of financial support which enabled the party for a lavish campaign. Critics claim that an important part of the funding came from businesspeople close to the old Ben Ali power elite.

In the election for a constituent assembly, the PDP won 3.9% of the popular vote and 16 of 217 seats in the National Constituent Assembly, putting it at the fifth place. As the party had categorically ruled out any collaboration with the victorious Islamist Ennahda Movement, the Progressive Democrats went into opposition and belong to the outspoken critics of the governing coalition of the Islamists with the secular CPR and Ettakatol parties. After the electoral defeat, the PDP launched talks with other secularist and liberal parties to form a "big party of the centre". The merger was realised on the PDP's fifth congress on 9 April 2012. The new party is called the Republican Party and comprises, in addition to the PDP, the Afek Tounes party, several extra-parliamentary parties and independents.
