= Republican Party (Tunisia) =

Republican Party الحزب الجمهوري
- French name: Parti républicain
- Abbreviation: Al Joumhouri
- Secretary-General: Issam Chebbi
- Founder: Maya Jribi
- Founded: 9 April 2012; 13 years ago
- Merger of: Progressive Democratic Party; Afek Tounes (portions); Tunisian Republican Party
- Ideology: Liberalism; Secularism
- Political position: Centre
- Assembly of the Representatives of the People: 0 / 217

Website
- aljoumhouri.net

The Republican Party (Arabic: الحزب الجمهوري Al-Ḥizb Al-Jumhūrī, French: Parti républicain) is a centrist liberal party in Tunisia. It was formed on 9 April 2012 as a merger of the Progressive Democratic Party (PDP), Afek Tounes and the Tunisian Republican Party, several minor parties and independents. The party is led by Maya Jribi who was previously the secretary-general of the PDP. The party held 11 out of 217 seats and was the largest oppositional party in the National Constituent Assembly of Tunisia. The party withdrew from the Union for Tunisia coalition, though it is still part of the National Salvation Front.

After the founding congress, nine assemblymen elected for the PDP contested the leadership vote and temporarily suspended their party membership. Those 9 members became part of the Democratic Alliance Party.

After the 2019 parliamentary election, the party had no seats.
