= Democratic Alliance Party (Tunisia) =

Democratic Alliance التحالف الديمقراطي
- French name: Alliance démocratique
- Secretary-General: Mohamed Hamdi
- Founded: 8 November 2012
- Dissolved: 15 October 2017
- Split from: Progressive Democratic Party
- Merged into: Democratic Current
- Ideology: Social liberalism Social conservatism
- Political position: Centre

The Democratic Alliance Party was a political party was Tunisia founded on 8 November 2012. Shortly after its creation, the party had nine representatives in the constituent assembly who left the Progressive Democratic Party. Its secretary general was Mohamed Hamdi. The party merged into the Democratic Current in October 2017.
