= Afek Tounes =

Afek Tounes آفاق تونس
- President: Rym Mahjoub
- Founded: 28 March 2011
- Ideology: Liberalism; Secularism
- Political position: Centre-right
- Regional affiliation: Arab Liberal Federation
- European affiliation: Alliance of Conservatives and Reformists in Europe (regional partner, until 2019)
- International affiliation: Liberal International (since 2021)
- Assembly of the Representatives of the People: 0 / 161

Website
- afektounes.tn

Afek Tounes (Arabic: آفاق تونس, "Tunisian Aspiration(s)" or "Horizons of Tunisia") is a centre-right political party in Tunisia. Its program is liberal, focusing on secularism and civil liberties. The party mainly appealed to intellectuals and the upper class.

Moncef Marzouki accused the party of having ties to the now banned Constitutional Democratic Rally. The party took offense to his statements and considered his accusation to be "inappropriate" and, according to Al Maghreb, sued him for "deficiency of professional ethics."

Afek Tounes won four seats for the constitutive assembly. The party was rattled on 3 November 2011 though by the resignation of several key founding members such as its spokesperson Emna Mnif, its general secretary Mustapha Mezghani, Sami Zaoui, Hela Hababou and another 13 members.

After underperforming in the 2011 Constituent Assembly election, Afek Tounes joined talks with other secularist and liberal parties, especially the Progressive Democratic Party to form a "big party of the centre". The merger was completed on 9 April 2012. The new party is called the Republican Party.

In August 2013, Yassine Brahim and other former party members left the Republican Party to revive Afek Tounes.

On 19 December 2020, Fadhel Abdelkefi was elected president by the national council for a four year term.

In March 2021, the party cofounds the Al Hurriya Liberal Network.

Abdelkefi resigned from the presidency of Afek Tounes on 19 October 2023.

On 10 December 2023, Rym Mahjoub was elected as president of the party running for the presidency against the party’s executive director Abderrahmane Belgacem. Mahjoub received 59.41% of the votes while Abderrahmane Belgacem obtained 37.17%.

== Election results ==
Election year	# of total votes	% of overall vote	# of seats
Constituent Assembly of Tunisia
2011	76,488	1.89%	4 / 217
Assembly of the Representatives of the People
2014	102,916	3.02%	8 / 217
2019	43,892	1.53%	2 / 217
