= Habib Essid =

Tunisian politician (born 1949)

His Excellency Habib Essid
- حبيب الصيد
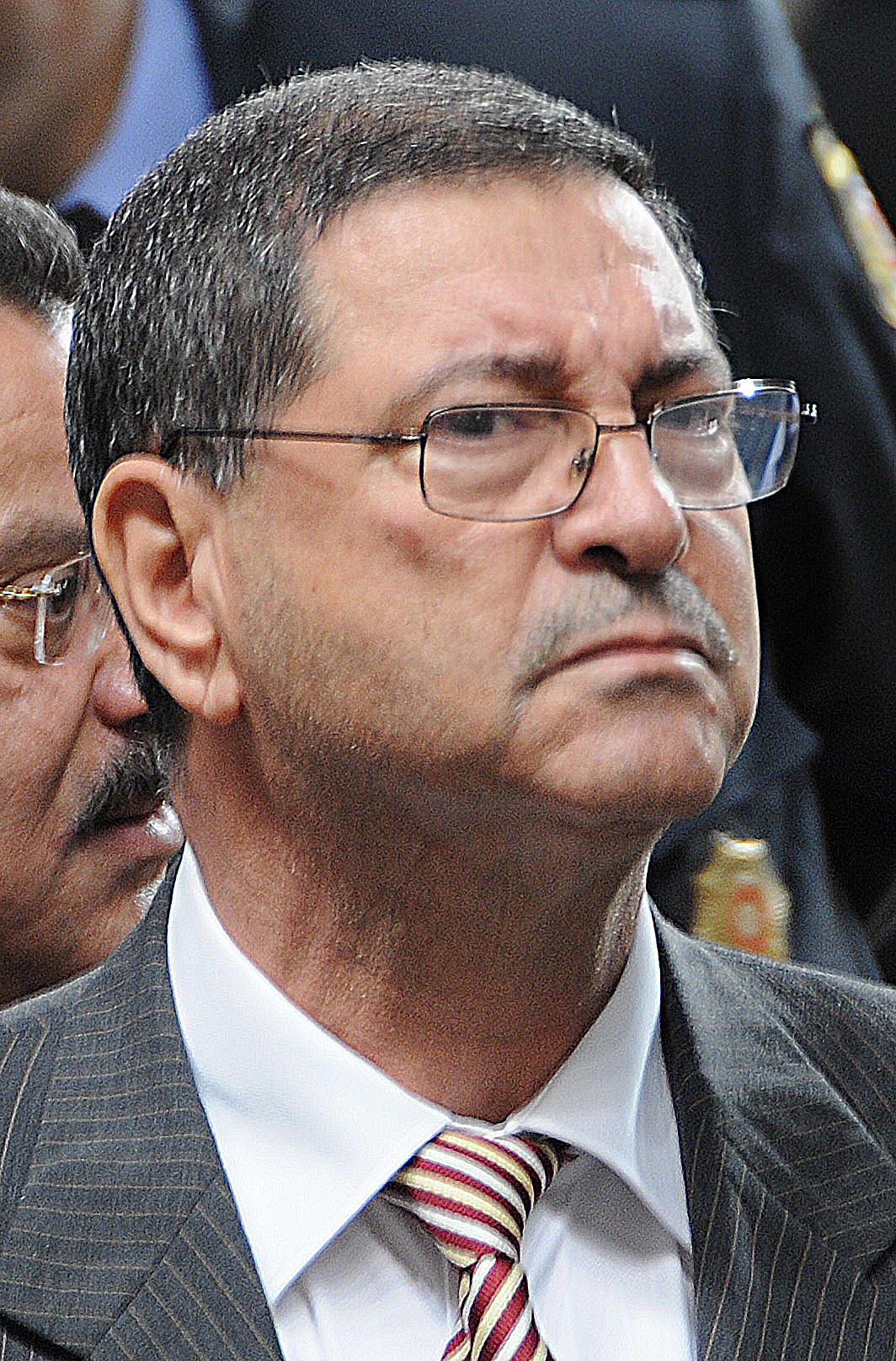
- Essid in 2011

Prime Minister of Tunisia
- In office 6 February 2015 – 27 August 2016
- President: Beji Caid Essebsi
- Preceded by: Mehdi Jomaa
- Succeeded by: Youssef Chahed

Minister of the Interior
- In office 28 March 2011 – 24 December 2011
- Prime Minister: Beji Caid Essebsi
- Preceded by: Farhat Rajhi
- Succeeded by: Ali Laarayedh

Personal details
- Born: 1 June 1949 (age 77) Sousse, Tunisia
- Party: Independent
- Education: Tunis University; University of Minnesota, Twin Cities

Habib Essid (Arabic: حبيب الصيد; born 1 June 1949) is a Tunisian politician who was the Prime Minister of Tunisia from 6 February 2015 to 27 August 2016. He was the first Head of Government to be appointed following the adoption of the new constitution and thus considered to be the first Head of Government of the Second Tunisian Republic. He previously served as Minister of the Interior in 2011.

== Early life, education and professional life ==
Born in Sousse in 1949, Essid received his master's degree in economics from Tunis University and added a masters programme in agricultural economics from the University of Minnesota.

He started his career in the public sector, notably in the Ministry of Agriculture. In 1993, he was named cabinet director at the Ministry of Agriculture, remaining in that post until 1997. He later served as cabinet director at the Ministry of the Interior. In 2001, he was appointed Secretary of State for Fishing and later on as Secretary of State for the Environment. From 2004 to 2010, Habib Essid was Executive Director of the International Olive Council, headquartered in Madrid.

After the Tunisian Revolution, he was appointed Minister of the Interior in the government of Prime Minister Beji Caid Essebsi on 28 March 2011. He was also chosen by Hamadi Jebali to be his Security Advisor following the 23 October 2011 elections.

== Head of Government of Tunisia ==
On 5 January 2015, Essid was nominated as Head of Government by Nidaa Tounes and asked to form a new government.

Initially, he formed a government composed of two political parties: Nidaa Tounes and the Free Patriotic Union. Following the announcement, all excluded political parties rejected the formation, leaving Essid short of the required 109 seats needed to obtain confidence.

On 2 February 2015 the newly appointed Head of Government announced an inclusive new coalition government whose members include representatives of the Islamist Ennahda party and the secular parties Nidaa Tounes, the Free Patriotic Union and the liberals of Afek Tounes. On 5 February 2015, Essid's cabinet was approved by the parliament. The cabinet was sworn in the following day.

On 26 June 2015, in the wake of the 2015 Sousse attacks, Essid promised to close 80 mosques within the week. The tourism industry, prior to the March Bardo National Museum attack, accounted for seven percent of Tunisia's GDP and almost 400,000 direct and indirect jobs. The government also plans to crack down on financing for certain associations as a countermeasure against another attack. Essid announced that:

The country is under threat; the government is under threat. Without the cooperation of everyone and a show of unity, we cannot win this war. We have won some battles and lost others, but our objective is to win the war... Some mosques continue to spread their propaganda and their venom to promote terrorism. No mosque that does not conform to the law will be tolerated.

Essid lost a parliamentary confidence vote on 30 July 2016; there were 118 votes against him and three in favor.

== Personal life ==
Habib Essid is married and has three children: his eldest works in Canada, his middle daughter is a professor in food science, and his youngest daughter is a medical resident.

== Honors ==
- Commander and later Grand Cordon of the Order of the Republic (Tunisia);
- Grand Officer of the National Order of Merit (Tunisia)
- Grand Vermeil Medal of the City of Paris

Political offices
Preceded by Mehdi Jomaa	Prime Minister of Tunisia; 2015–2016	Succeeded by Youssef Chahed
