= Youssef Chahed =

Tunisian politician (born 1970)

His Excellency Youssef Chahed
- يوسف الشاهد
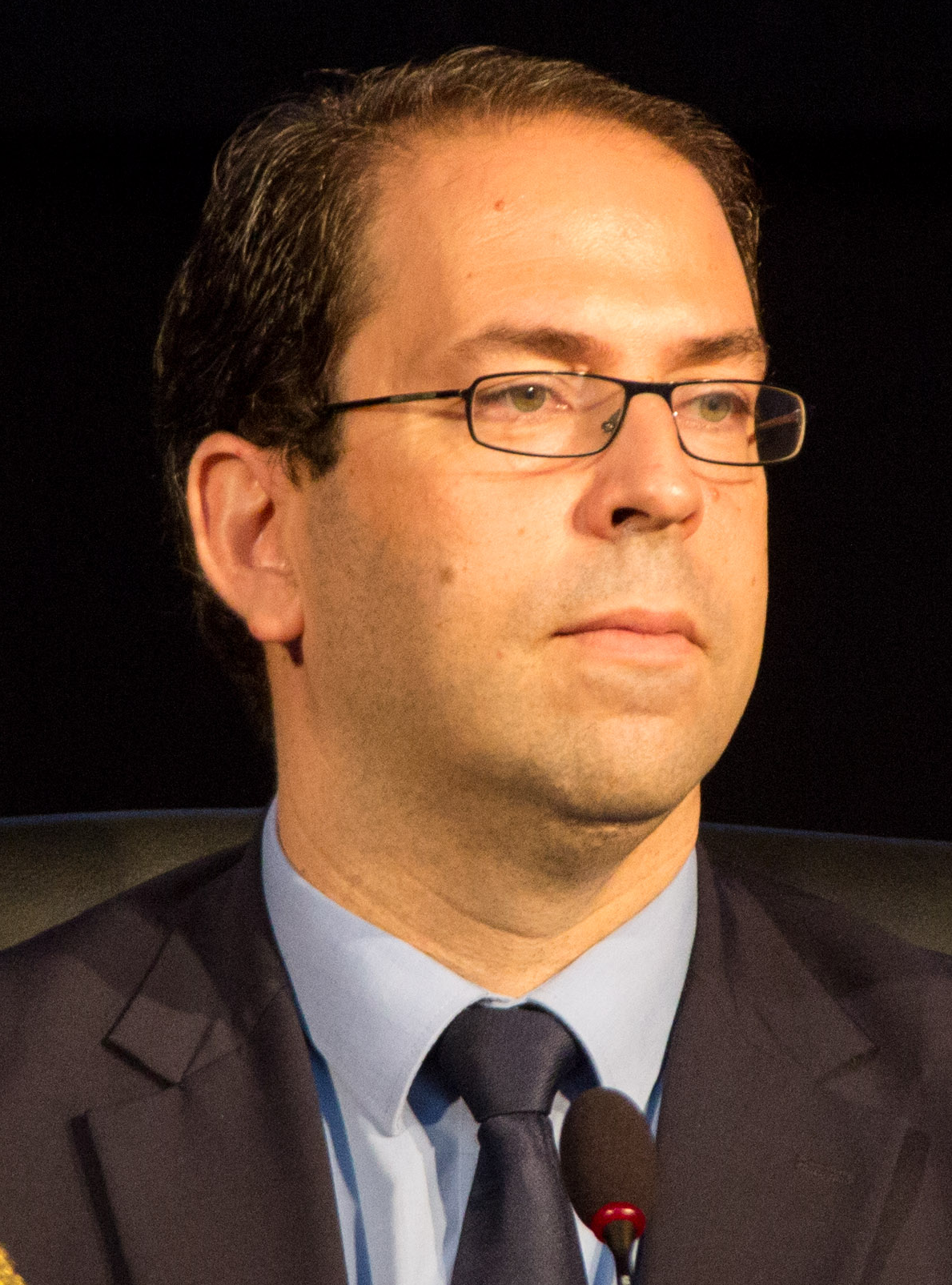
- Chahed in 2016

Prime Minister of Tunisia
- In office 27 August 2016 – 27 February 2020
- President: Beji Caid Essebsi; Mohamed Ennaceur (acting); Kais Saied
- Preceded by: Habib Essid
- Succeeded by: Elyes Fakhfakh

President of Tahya Tounes
- Incumbent
- Assumed office 2 June 2019
- Preceded by: Position established

Personal details
- Born: 18 September 1975 (age 50) Tunis, Tunisia
- Party: Al Joumhouri (2012); Nidaa Tounes (Before 2019); Tahya Tounes (2019–present)
- Education: Tunis University; National Institute of Agriculture, Paris-Grignon

Youssef Chahed (Arabic: يوسف الشاهد; born 18 September 1975) is a Tunisian politician who served as the 14th prime minister of Tunisia from 27 August 2016 to 27 February 2020. He served as Secretary of State for Fisheries and Minister of Local Affairs in the past.

He was a member of the Nidaa Tounes party until he formed Tahya Tounes. By profession, he is an agricultural engineer, researcher and university professor. He was elected president of the newly founded Tahya Tounes party on 2 June 2019.

He is a member of The Trilateral Commission.

== Education and career ==
Born in Tunis in 1975, Youssef Chahed studied to become an agricultural engineer at the National Agricultural Institute of Tunisia, where he graduated as valedictorian in 1998.

He then joined the Institut National Agronomique Paris-Grignon in France. He graduated in 1999, obtaining a postgraduate diploma (DEA) in environmental economics and resource and in 2003 a PhD in Agricultural Economics under the direction of Jean-Christophe Bureau. The title of his DEA was "Measuring the impact on the welfare of tariff cuts on agricultural products: an application of the Trade Restrictiveness Index (TRI) to the economy of the European Union," and his doctoral thesis was on "measuring the impact of agricultural trade liberalization on trade and welfare".

Until 2009, he taught agricultural economics at the Higher Institute of Agriculture in France and in other countries as a visiting professor. He speaks Arabic, French, English, and Italian fluently.

== Prime minister ==
On 6 August 2016, after President of the Government Habib Essid lost a confidence vote in parliament, Chahed was nominated by the Nidaa Tounes party to succeed Essid as head of the Government. On 26 August 2016, his Government was approved by the Assembly of People's Representatives with 167 votes in favour out of 194 votes cast and he was therefore appointed prime minister by the President of Tunisia, Beji Caid Essebsi. Chahed has been described as "previously unknown" in the political scene before this role.

Nate Grubman, a scholar at Stanford University, writes about Chahed's tenure as prime minister:

"As prime minister, Chahed initially tried to portray himself as an anticorruption warrior. His first shot was the arrest of businessman Chafik Jarraya and a number of others allegedly involved in smuggling. But it was difficult to discern whether Chahed's move against Jarraya was a neutral application of the law or an attempt to hamstring his political rivals."

In 2019, the Chahed government banned the burqa after the 2019 Tunis bombings. The same year, Chahed announced his candidacy for the Tunisian presidency.

=== Austerity ===
In 2018 protests erupted as a reaction to the newly passed Finance Act which took effect on 1 January, that raised taxes on gasoline, phone cards, housing, internet usage, hotel rooms and foods such as fruits and vegetables. Customs taxes on cosmetics and some agricultural products were also raised.

The Popular Front, an alliance of leftist opposition parties, called for continued protests against the government's "unjust" austerity measures while Tunisian Prime Minister Youssef Chahed denounced the violence and appealed for calm, claiming that he and his government believes that 2018 "would be the last difficult year for the Tunisians".

== Post-premiership ==
Following President Kais Saied's July 2021 suspension of parliament, Chahed became one of numerous former officials and opposition figures prosecuted in cases that human rights organizations including Amnesty International and the International Commission of Jurists have described as politically motivated. Two separate cases were brought against him, both tried in absentia.

In one proceeding, government prosecutors alleged that Chahed had received funds from Henry Kissinger and channeled them to opposition leader Ahmed Nejib Chebbi to destabilize the state. The charge drew international attention because Kissinger had died in November 2023, before the alleged conduct was said to have occurred.

Since seizing power in 2021, President Saied has dismantled judicial independence in Tunisia by dissolving the body that oversaw judges, dismissing 57 of them by decree, and giving himself the power to hire and fire judges and prosecutors at will.

Political offices
| Preceded by Habib Essid | Prime Minister of Tunisia; 2016–2020 | Succeeded by Elyes Fakhfakh |
