= Assembly of the Representatives of the People =

Legislature of Tunisia

Coordinates: 36.8087°N 10.1353°E

Assembly of the Representatives of the People مجلس نواب الشعب Majlis nuwwāb aš-ša‘b
- 3rd legislature

Type
- Type: Lower house

History
- Preceded by: Constituent Assembly of Tunisia
- New session started: 13 March 2023

Leadership
- Speaker: Ibrahim Bouderbala, Independent since 13 March 2023
- First Deputy Speaker: Saoussen Mabrouk, Independent since 13 March 2023
- Second Deputy Speaker: Anouar Marzouki, Independent since 13 March 2023

Structure
- Political groups: Independent (39); Voice of the Republic (25); National Independent Bloc (21); Honesty and Work (20); Al Ahrar (19); For the People to Triumph (15); National Sovereign League (15) (Note: Echaab (11); PUPD (2); Independent (2)); Vacant (7)

Elections
- Voting system: Two-round system
- Last election: 17 December 2022; 29 January 2023

Meeting place
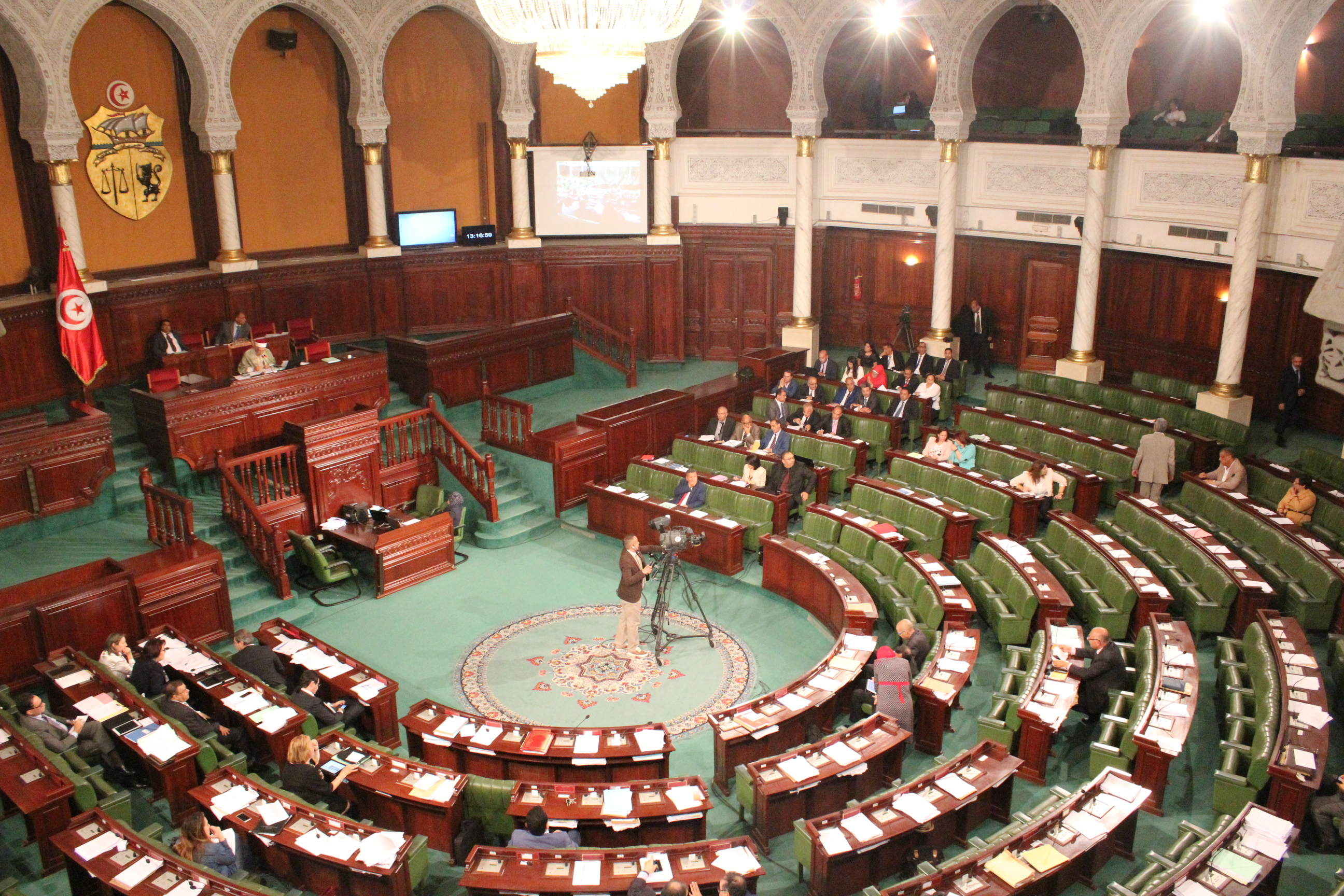
- Bardo Palace, Le Bardo (near Tunis)

Website
- www.arp.tn

The Assembly of the Representatives of the People (Arabic: مجلس نواب الشعب Majlis nuwwāb aš-ša‘b, French: Assemblée des représentants du peuple; ARP) is the lower house of the Parliament of Tunisia. The Assembly replaced the Constituent Assembly and was first elected on 26 October 2014. The legislature consists of 161 seats. Before the 2011 revolution, Tunisia's parliament consisted of an upper chamber called the Chamber of Advisors and a lower chamber called the Chamber of Deputies.

== Elections ==
The first elections to the Assembly were held on 26 October 2014, slightly under four years since the conclusion of the Tunisian Revolution, and slightly over three years since the election of the Constituent Assembly. Nidaa Tounes gained a plurality of votes, winning 85 seats in the 217-seat parliament, beating the Ennahda Movement (69 seats) and many smaller parties.

=== 2019 election ===
The second election to the Assembly was held on 6 October 2019. During the election, civil society groups were concerned about the spread of hate speech and disinformation on social media. In 2019 Facebook implemented policy measures that address political and election-related conversations on the site in India, Australia, the United States, the United Kingdom, the EU, Brazil, and Canada. These policies allow for data on ad campaigns to be released for study to help improve future democratic elections. Such policies had not yet been implemented in the Middle East or North Africa. During the election, Facebook was one of the main platforms for campaigning. The camping data was primarily inaccessible to any observation agency. This lack of information raised concerns for civil society groups that wished to study the data and monitor the spread of disinformation during the election.

=== Suspension of Parliament on 25 July 2021 ===
On 25 July 2021, in light of violent demonstrations against the government demanding the improvement of basic services and amid a growing COVID-19 outbreak, Saied suspended parliament for thirty days and waiving the immunity of the parliament members and ordering the military to close the parliament house.

On 24 August 2021, Saied extended the suspension of parliament, although the constitution states the parliament can only be suspended for a month, raising concerns in some quarters about the future of democracy in the country. There is currently no constitutional court in Tunisia to offer jurisdiction in his interpretation of the constitution.

On 22 September, Saied announced that he will rule by decree and ignore parts of the constitution.

On 13 December 2021, Saied extended the suspension of the parliament until a new election takes place, and announced a nationwide public consultation that would take place from 1 January until 20 March 2022 to gather suggestions for constitutional and other reforms after which Saied would appoint a committee of experts to draft a new constitution, to be ready by June ahead of the referendum that will take place on 25 July 2022. He said that new parliamentary elections will be held on 17 December 2022, after going through the referendum and preparing a new electoral system.

=== Dissolution on 30 March 2022 ===
On 30 March 2022 president Saied ordered the formal dissolution of the Assembly, in order to "preserve the state and its institutions". Some hours before, parliamentarians held a plenary session online and voted through a bill against Saied's "exceptional measures".

=== Re-convention in March 2023 ===
A year after president Saied formally dissolved the Assembly, the new parliament sat for the first time in March 2023. This was the first time parliament sat since the previous parliament was sealed by the army in 2021 and since the elections in December 2022 and January 2023.

Both elections were boycotted by large parts of the population, with only 11% of the eligible voters voting in the elections. The session was heavily restricted with only journalists from the state broadcaster and official state news agency allowed inside the building to report on the events of the first session, while dozens of reporters protested outside.

== See also ==
- Politics of Tunisia
- List of legislatures by country
