= Politics of Tunisia =

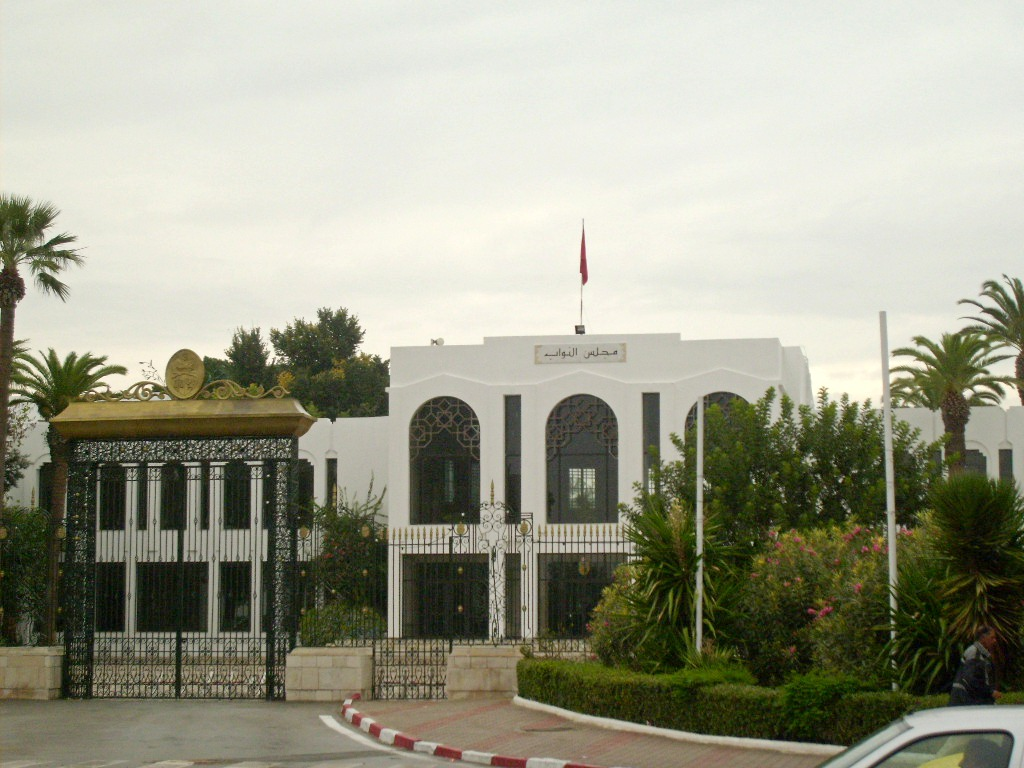
Tunisian Chamber of Deputies

The politics of Tunisia takes place within the framework of a unitary presidential representative democratic republic, with a president serving as head of state, prime minister as head of government, a unicameral legislature and a court system influenced by French civil law. Between 1956 and 2011, Tunisia operated as a de facto one-party state, with politics dominated by the secular Constitutional Democratic Rally (RCD) under former presidents Habib Bourguiba and then Zine el Abidine Ben Ali. However, in 2011 a national uprising led to the ousting of Ben Ali and the dismantling of the RCD, paving the way for a multi-party democracy. October 2014 saw the first democratic parliamentary elections since the 2011 revolution, resulting in a win by the secularist Nidaa Tounes party with 85 seats in the 217-member assembly.

Tunisia is a member of the Arab League, the African Union and the Organization of Islamic Cooperation. It maintains close relations with the United States, France and the European Union, with which it entered an Association Agreement in 1995. Tunisia's favorable relations with the United States and the European Union were earned following years of successful economic cooperation in the private sector and infrastructure modernization.

The Economist Intelligence Unit rated Tunisia a "hybrid regime" in 2022.

Tunisia's first democratically elected president, Beji Caid Essebsi, died in July 2019. After him, Kais Saied, a constitutional law professor, became Tunisia's president after a landslide victory in the 2019 Tunisian presidential elections in October 2019. He built his campaign around being anti-corruption, anti-establishment and socially conservative. He was nicknamed "Robotcop" because of his stiff manners. However, on 25 July 2021 he suspended Parliament, fired the prime minister and consolidated power in a self-coup. Since then, Saied has overseen the dismissal of the judiciary and arrest of his main political opposition figures. He won a second term with more than 90% of the vote in the 2024 Tunisian presidential election, which was not conducted freely and fairly, and under boycotts from the political opposition.

== Government ==
Tunisia was a representative democracy with an executive president, a legislature and judiciary, starting with elections in 2014 until the president suspended parliament and began ruling by decree on 25 July 2021. Since then, all the trappings of an authoritarian state have returned. The military is neutral and does not play any role in national politics.

=== Executive branch ===
In Tunisia, the president was directly elected for a five-year term. The president nominates the candidate of the party that gained the most votes in legislative elections to form a government within a month. The nominee must submit his program to the Assembly of the Representatives of the People and get the trust of the majority of its members before being appointed prime minister. Regional governors and local administrators are appointed by the central government. Mayors and municipal councils are directly elected.

=== Legislative branch ===
Tunisia's legislative branch consists of the Assembly of the Representatives of the People, with 161 seats. The first elections for the Assembly of the Representative of the People occurred on 26 October 2014.

Before the 2011 revolution the parliament was bicameral. The lower house was the Chamber of Deputies of Tunisia (Majlis al-Nuwaab), which had 214 seats. Members were elected by popular vote to serve five-year terms. At least 25% of the seats in the House of Deputies were reserved for the opposition. More than 27% of the members of the Chamber of Deputies were women. The lower house played a growing role as an arena for debate on national policy, especially as it hosted representatives from six opposition parties. Opposition members often voted against bills or abstained. However, because the governing party enjoyed a comfortable majority, bills usually passed with only minor changes.

The upper house was the Chamber of Advisors, which had 112 members, including representatives of governorates (provinces), professional organizations and national figures. Of these, 41 were appointed by the head of state while 71 were elected by their peers. About 15% of the members of the Chamber of Advisors were women.

=== Judicial branch ===
The Tunisian legal system is based on French civil law system. Some judicial review of legislative acts takes place in the Supreme Court in joint session. The judiciary is independent, although the Supreme Judicial Council is chaired by the president of the republic.

The Tunisian Order of Lawyers is a non-profit bar association. All Tunisian lawyers are members of the Order, which does not have any political affiliations.

The Constitution of 2014 provides for a newly constituted Constitutional Court. It consists of 12 members, each of whom must have 20 years' experience in order to serve for a single term of nine years. Two thirds are specialized in law. The president of the republic, the president of the Assembly of the Representatives of the People and the Supreme Judicial Council each propose four candidates; the Assembly of the Representatives of the People approves nominations with a three-fifths majority. The Constitutional Court appoints its own president and vice president, both specialized in law.

== Political parties and elections ==
Since 1987 Tunisia has reformed its political system several times, abolishing life-term presidencies and opening up the parliament to opposition parties. The number of new political parties and associations has increased since the beginning of Ben Ali's presidency in 1987. Shortly before the revolution of 2011 there were eight recognized national parties, six of which held national legislative seats. President Ben Ali's party, known as the Constitutional Democratic Rally (RCD), commanded majorities in local, regional, and national elections. Although the party was renamed (in President Bourguiba's days it was the Socialist Destourian Party), its policies were still considered to be largely secular and conservative. However, the Tunisian Revolution in 2011 saw its removal from power.

=== 2009 national elections ===
The Tunisian national elections of 2009, overseen by the Interior Ministry and held on October 25, 2009, elected candidates for president and legislative offices. During the campaign, speeches by candidates were aired on Tunisian radio and television stations. Participation was 89% of resident citizens and 90% of citizens living abroad. In the presidential vote, Ben Ali soundly defeated his challengers, Mohamed Bouchiha (PUP), Ahmed Inoubli (UDU) and Ahmed Ibrahim (Ettajdid Movement) for a fifth term in office. His 89% of the vote was slightly lower than in the 2004 election. In the parliamentary elections, the RCD received 84% of the vote for 161 constituency seats. The MDS won 16 seats under the proportional representation system, followed by the PUP with 12 seats. Fifty-nine women were elected to legislative seats.

The election was criticized by opposition parties and some international observers for limitations placed on non-incumbents. In one instance, the Ettajdid party's weekly publication, Ettarik al-Jadid, was seized by authorities for violating campaign communications laws. Meanwhile, a delegation from the African Union Commission praised the election for taking place with "calm and serenity". Prior to the 2009 election, Tunisia amended its constitution to allow more candidates to run for president, allowing the top official from each political party to compete for the presidency regardless of whether they held seats in parliament.

=== 2011 Constituent Assembly election ===
Following the 2010–2011 protests and the vacation of the presidency by President Ben Ali, elections for a Constituent Assembly were held on 23 October 2011. Results were announced on 25 October 2011 with the center-right and moderately Islamist Ennahda winning a plurality with 37% of the vote.

=== 2014 parliamentary elections ===
Parliamentary elections were held in Tunisia on 26 October 2014. Results were announced on 27 October 2014 with secularist Nidaa Tounes winning a plurality with 38% of the vote.

=== 2019 parliamentary and presidential elections ===
In the parliamentary election, the Ennahda became the biggest party with 52 seats, while the Heart of Tunisia became the second with 38 seats. In the presidential election, independent candidate Kais Saied got a landslide victory with 72.5% of the vote in the second round.

=== 2022 constitutional referendum ===
In July 2022, Tunisians approved a new constitution in a referendum. The reform gave more powers to Tunisia's president, meaning the role of President Kais Saied strengthened significantly.

=== 2024 presidential elections ===
In October 2024, Tunisia held presidential elections, which some political parties boycotted, while others had many of their leaders jailed since 2021. The Tunisian Independent High Authority for Elections (ISIE) rejected 14 candidacies filed, only accepting three candidates - President Saied; former deputy Zouhair Maghzaoui (a supporter of Saied and his coup); and former deputy Ayachi Zammel. The candidacies of Mondher Zenaidi, Abdellatif Mekki and Imed Daïmi, were rejected at first but later reinstated in late August 2024, by the Supreme Administrative Court which ruled that the candidates must be allowed to run during the presidential elections.

The ISIE, whose members are mostly appointed by Saied, disregarded this ruling, arguing that the ISIE hadn't received it on time, which was denied by the adminastrive court.

== Politics and society ==
=== Women's equality ===
The now-defunct Chamber of Deputies had 23% women members in 2009, outpacing the percentage of women serving at the time in the U.S. Congress, which stood at 17% in the 111th Congress. More than one-fifth of the seats in both chambers of parliament were held by women, an exceptionally high level in the Arab world.

Tunisia is the only country in the Arab world where polygamy is forbidden by law. This is part of a provision in the country's Code of Personal Status which was introduced by President Bourguiba in 1956.

=== Revolution ===
==== Ben Ali regime ====
President Zine El Abidine Ben Ali was criticized for the low levels of democracy and freedom of expression in the country by Amnesty International and various other organizations. which documented restrictions of basic human rights and obstruction of human rights organizations. The Economist's 2008 Democracy Index ranked Tunisia 141 out of 167 countries studied and 143 out of 173 regarding freedom of the press. Later in his rule repression became more brutal, corruption more visible and the economy more stagnant.

==== 2010–2011 revolution ====
The Tunisian Revolution overthrew President Ben Ali in 2011—marking the beginning of the Arab Spring.

On 14 January 2011, president Zine El Abidine Ben Ali officially resigned after fleeing to Saudi Arabia, ending 23 years in power, following the most dramatic wave of social and political unrest in Tunisia in three decades. Street protests and civil disobedience against high unemployment, food inflation, corruption, a lack of political freedoms like freedom of speech and poor living conditions, were sparked by the self-immolation of Mohamed Bouazizi on 17 December 2010.

A Constituent Assembly was elected on 23 October 2011, and a new constitution was adopted on 26 January 2014. It was passed on 10 February 2014.

=== Media ===
Under the Ben Ali regime, freedom of the press was officially guaranteed, but the press was highly restricted, as was a substantial amount of web content. Journalists were often obstructed from reporting on controversial events. Prior to the Jasmine Revolution, Tunisia practiced internet censorship against popular websites such as YouTube. In 2010 Reporters Without Borders included Tunisia in the country list of “Enemies of the Internet". Despite this, Tunisia hosted the second half of the United Nations-sponsored World Summit on the Information Society in 2005, which endorsed the freedom of the internet as a platform for political participation and human rights protection. By 2010, Tunisia had more than 3.5 million regular internet users and 1.6 million Facebook users and hundreds of internet cafes, known as 'publinet.'

Five private radio stations have been established, including Mosaique FM, Express FM, Shems FM and private television stations such as Hannibal TV and Nessma TV.

== Administrative divisions ==
Tunisia is divided into 24 governorates:

- Ariana Governorate (Aryanah)
- Béja Governorate (Bajah)
- Ben Arous Governorate (Bin 'Arus)
- Bizerte Governorate (Banzart)
- Gabès Governorate (Qabis)
- Gafsa Governorate (Qafsah)
- Jendouba Governorate (Jundubah)
- Kairouan Governorate (Al Qayrawan)
- Kasserine Governorate (Al Qasrayn)
- Kebili Governorate (Qibili)
- Kef Governorate (Al Kaf)
- Mahdia Governorate (Al Mahdiyah)
- Manouba Governorate (Manubah)
- Medenine Governorate (Madanin)
- Monastir Governorate (Al Munastir)
- Nabeul Governorate (Nabul)
- Sfax Governorate (Safaqis)
- Sidi Bouzid Governorate (Sidi Bu Zayd)
- Siliana Governorate (Silyanah)
- Sousse Governorate (Sousse)
- Tataouine Governorate (Tatawin)
- Tozeur Governorate (Tawzar)
- Tunis Governorate (Tunis)
- Zaghouan Governorate (Zaghwan)

== International organization participation ==
Tunisia is a participant in the following international organizations:

- ABEDA
- ACCT
- AfDB
- AFESD
- AMF
- AMU
- AU
- BSEC (observer)
- ENP
- FAO
- G-77
- IAEA
- IBRD
- ICAO
- ICC
- ICFTU
- ICRM
- IDA
- IDB
- IFAD
- IFC
- IFRCS
- IHO
- ILO
- IMF
- IMO
- Interpol
- IOC
- IOM
- ISO
- ITU
- LAS
- MICAH
- MONUC
- NAM
- OAPEC
- OAS (observer)
- OIC
- OPCW
- OSCE (partner)
- UN
- UNCTAD
- UNESCO
- UNHCR
- UNIDO
- UNMEE
- UNMIK
- UPU
- WCO
- WFTU
- WHO
- WIPO
- WMO
- WToO
- WTO

== See also ==
- Censorship in Tunisia
- Human rights in Tunisia
- Tunisia Monitoring Group
- Sihem Bensedrine
