= Human trafficking in Tunisia =

Tunisia ratified the 2000 UN TIP (Trafficking in Persons) Protocol in July 2003.

In 2009, Tunisia was a source, destination, and possible transit country for men, women, and children subjected to trafficking in persons, specifically forced labor and forced prostitution. In 2009, one Tunisian female was rescued from forced prostitution in Lebanon. In 2008, two women were rescued from forced prostitution in Jordan and three men from forced labor in Italy. Based on limited available data, some Tunisian girls may have been trafficked within the country for involuntary domestic servitude. In 2009 a Tunisian academic published a study on Tunisian domestic workers. The study, conducted in 2008, surveyed 130 domestic workers in the Greater Tunis region and found that 52 percent were under the age of 16; twenty-three percent claimed to be victims of physical violence, and 11 percent of sexual violence. Ninety-nine percent indicated they had no work contracts and the majority received salaries below the minimum wage. These conditions are indicators of possible forced labor.

In 2009, the Government of Tunisia did not fully comply with the minimum standards for the elimination of trafficking; however, it is making significant efforts to do so. Despite these efforts, the government did not show evidence of progress in prosecuting and convicting trafficking offenders, proactively identifying or protecting trafficking victims, or raising public awareness of human trafficking over the last year; therefore, Tunisia was placed on the Tier 2 Watch List for the second consecutive year. The Tunisian government did not identify human trafficking as a problem in Tunisia. Victims of trafficking likely remained undetected because of a lack of effort to identify them among vulnerable groups.

The U.S. State Department's Office to Monitor and Combat Trafficking in Persons placed the country in "Tier 2" in 2017. The country was at Tier 2 in 2023.

== Prosecution (2008) ==
The Government of Tunisia made no discernible antihuman trafficking law enforcement progress over the reporting period. Tunisia's Penal Code prohibits some forms of human trafficking. The Penal Code prescribes punishments of 10 years' imprisonment for capturing, detaining, or sequestering a person for forced labor, and up to five years' imprisonment for forced prostitution of women and children. The Penal Code also criminalizes child prostitution. The prescribed penalties for forced labor are sufficiently stringent. The penalty for forced prostitution - five years' imprisonment - is sufficiently stringent, though not commensurate with penalties prescribed under Tunisian law for other serious offenses, such as rape. In addition to these laws the Penal Code prescribes one to two years' imprisonment for forced child begging. There were no investigations or prosecutions of trafficking offenses, or convictions of trafficking offenders, during the year; however, a Tunis court convicted and sentenced a Tunisian trafficker in April 2009. A press report indicated that the police opened an investigation into reports that a group of children had been sexually exploited by Libyan tourists. There is no evidence that the government provided anti-trafficking training to law enforcement officials in the reporting. There is no evidence of official tolerance of or complicity in trafficking in persons.

== Protection (2008) ==
The government did not offer trafficking victims access to shelters or other services during the reporting period. The government lacked formal procedures to identify trafficking victims among vulnerable groups, such as undocumented migrants and those persons detained for prostitution offenses. As a result, persons whose trafficking victim status was not recognized by Tunisian authorities were vulnerable to imprisonment and deportation if caught engaging in illegal activities under Tunisian law. The government neither undertook efforts to identify trafficking victims among the undocumented migrants in its detention centers, nor did it allow outside parties to screen these detained migrants to determine if any were victims of abuse. The government's social workers provided direct assistance to abused migrant women and children - including possible trafficking victims - in two shelters operated by a local NGO. The Ministry of Women's Affairs, Family, Children, and Elderly Persons continued to assign a child protection delegate to each of Tunisia's 24 districts to intervene in cases of sexual, economic, or criminal exploitation of children; these delegates ensured that child sex abuse victims received adequate medical care and counseling. The government does not offer trafficking victims legal alternatives to their removal to countries where they may face hardship or retribution.

== Prevention (2008) ==
The Tunisian government made no discernible efforts to prevent trafficking during the reporting period; there were no government campaigns to raise public awareness of trafficking. Tunisia took steps to reduced demand for commercial sex acts by enforcing laws against prostitution and arresting “clients” soliciting commercial sex; however, these measures also resulted in the detention of women in prostitution, including possible trafficking victims. The government did not provide anti-trafficking training for military troops prior to their deployment on international peacekeeping missions.

== Update (2026) ==
In 2024 an article published by Africanews Aljazeera described Tunisia as "one of the most popular transit points for illegal immigration to Europe", despite a recent operation which closed a human trafficking network of eight Tunisians. A report in 2025 from the Faculty of law at the University of Oxford identified Tunisia as a transit country for people being smuggled into detention camps in Libya.

== See also ==
- Human rights in Tunisia
- Slavery in Tunisia
