= Jawhar Ben Mbarek =

Jawhar Ben Mbarek is a Tunisian academic and political activist.

In February 2023, he was arrested by Tunisian authorities. His arrest and imprisonment have been controversial, with critics accusing the Tunisian government of political persecution. In 2025, he was sentenced to 18 years' imprisonment on charges of conspiring to overthrow the president.
