= 2024 Tunisian presidential election =

- 6 October 2024
- Turnout: 28.80% (▼20.18pp)
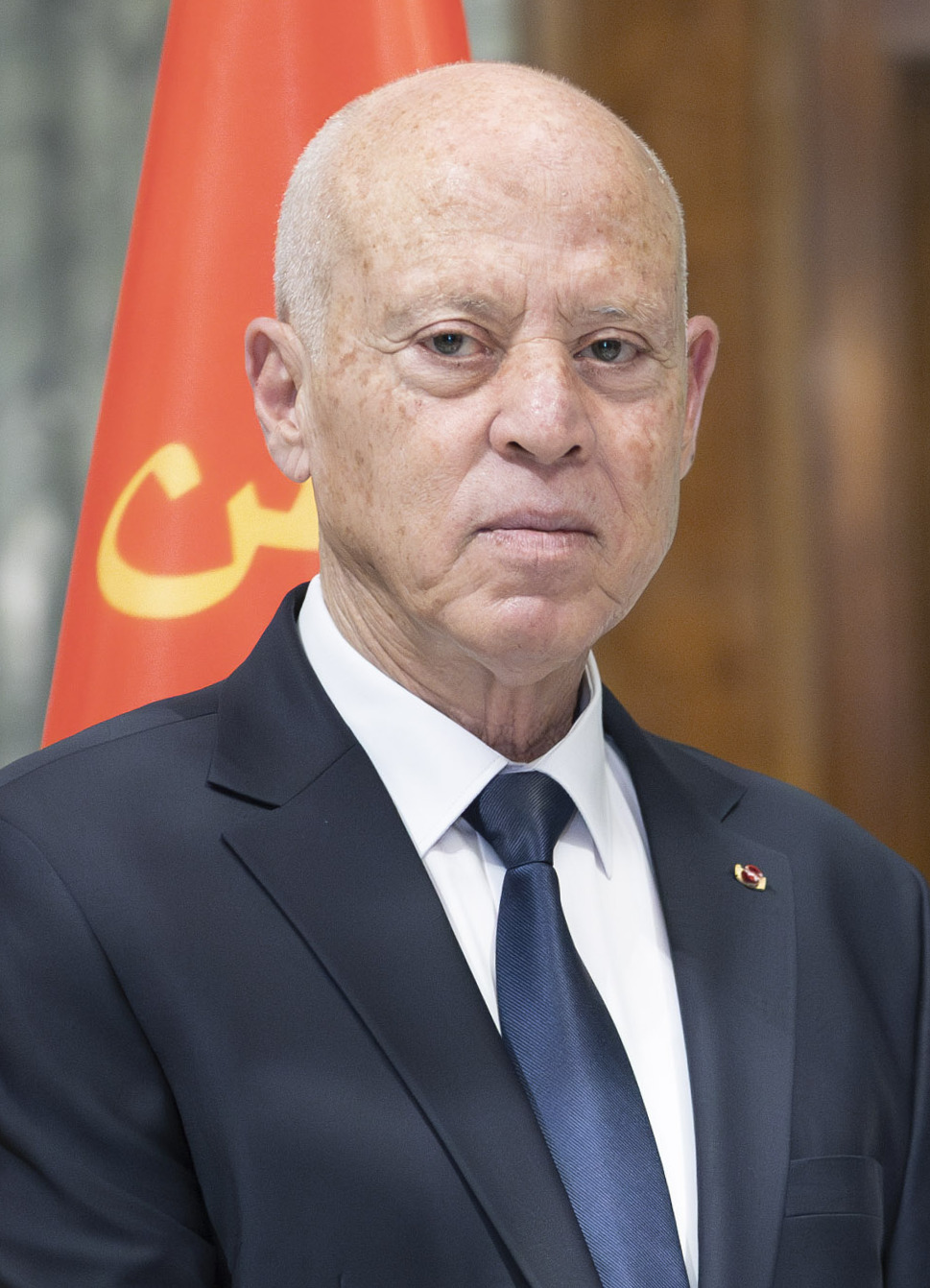

Candidate	Kais Saied	Ayachi Zammel
Party	Independent	Azimoun
Popular vote	2,438,954	197,551
Percentage	90.69%	7.35%
- Result by governorate
President before election
Kais Saied
Independent
Elected President
Kais Saied
Independent

Presidential elections were held in Tunisia on 6 October 2024. They were the first presidential elections since the promulgation of the 2022 constitution and were boycotted by most parties. After rejecting several candidacies, including those of the main opponents of incumbent president Kais Saied, the Independent High Authority for Elections (ISIE) confirmed the candidacies of only three candidates; Saied and former deputies Zouhair Maghzaoui and Ayachi Zammel, rejecting those of Mondher Zenaidi, Abdellatif Mekki and Imed Daïmi, who had been reinstated by the Administrative Court. This decision was contrary to the constitution, which stipulates that the decisions of the Administrative Court cannot be appealed.

On 14 September the Administrative Court ordered the ISIE to accept the candidacies, which the latter refused before the Assembly of the Representatives of the People, arguing that the ruling was made too late, which the Court denies.

Late September, and only nine days before the election, MPs voted in favor of amending the electoral law. Accusing the Administrative Court of "non-neutrality" and of working for foreign interests, they decided to transfer its prerogatives to the Court of Appeal of Tunis. Protesters and civil society denounced this amendement and said it "undermines election integrity".

A few weeks before the election, Ayachi Zammel, who had obtained the support of part of the opposition, was imprisoned and then sentenced to a total of thirteen years and eight months in prison in three trials for accusations of false sponsorship. The sentences against him were interpreted by several observers and non-governmental organizations as judicial harassment aimed at eliminating his candidacy. Similarly, the sidelining or imprisonment of other candidates were also denounced. Saied won with 91% of the vote, with a voter turnout of just under 29%, the lowest since the Tunisian revolution. He was inaugurated for a second term as president on 21 October.

== Background ==
On 25 July 2021, Republic Day, after months of political crisis between President of the Republic, Kais Saied and the Assembly of the Representatives of the People, thousands of protesters demanded the latter's dissolution and a change of regime. The government was criticized for the catastrophic state of the economy and its inaction, which led in particular to the worsening of the health crisis linked to the COVID-19 pandemic. That same evening, invoking Article 80 of the 2014 Constitution, Kais Saied dismissed the Mechichi Cabinet with immediate effect, in particular Hichem Mechichi from his duties as head of government and interim Minister of the Interior, announced the suspension of the assembly (whose members he lifted their immunity), the formation of a new government (which would be accountable to him) and his decision to govern by decree; he also indicated that he would chair the prosecution. Ennahda immediately denounced a "coup d'état". This description of a coup d'état is shared by political analysts and lawyers.

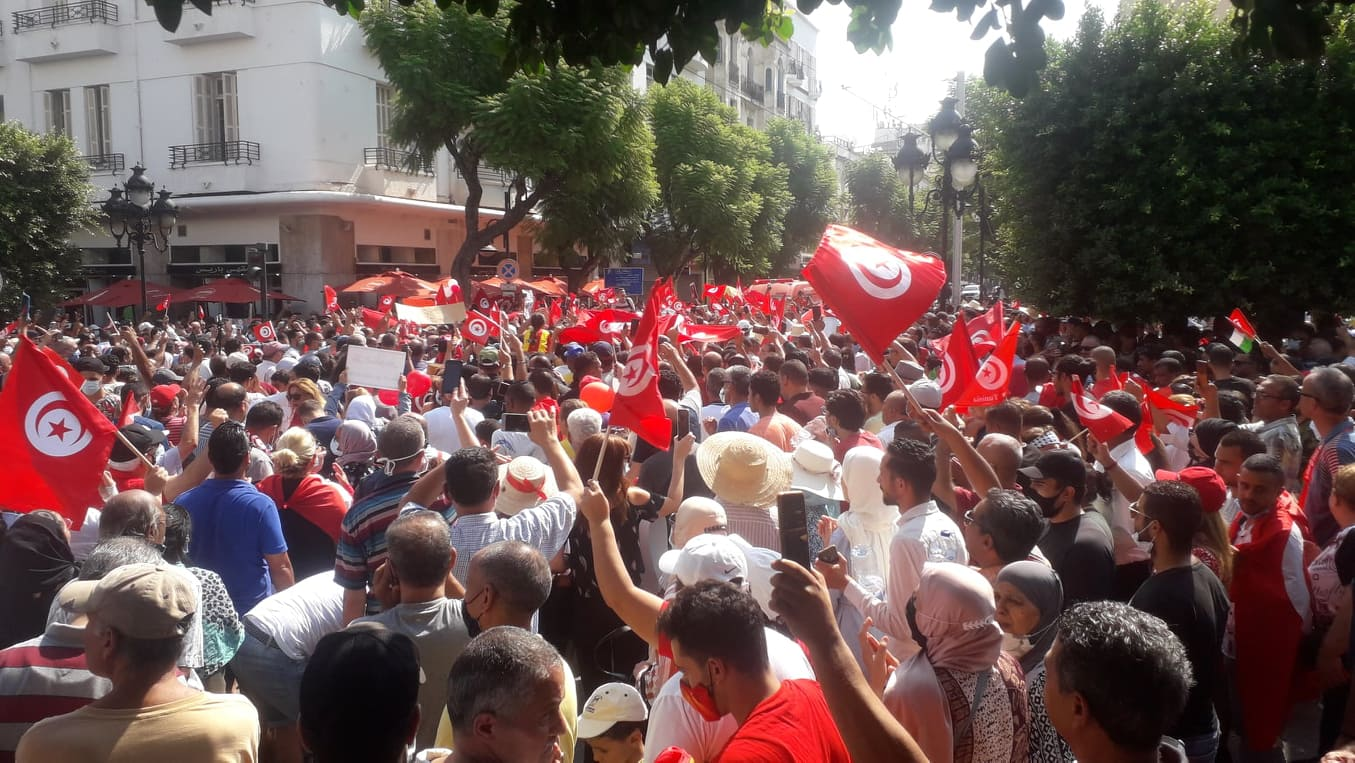
Pro-Saied protest in Avenue Habib Bourguiba, Tunis, 3 October 2021.

On 22 September he confirmed by decree the extension of the decisions as well as the dissolution of the Provisional Authority responsible for monitoring the constitutionality of draft laws, and decided to suspend the salaries and benefits granted to the President of the Assembly of the Representatives of the People and its members, and granted himself the right to govern by decree, de facto recovering legislative power. His decision was criticized by most of the parties represented in Parliament. On 29 September the President tasked Najla Bouden with forming a new government. From 15 January to 20 March 2022, an electronic consultation took place on the reforms to be proposed in anticipation of the referendum. In the vote, which had a very low turnout, the options of a transition to a presidential system and a single-member constituency for the legislative elections prevailed. On 30 March 120 deputies, chaired by the second vice-president of the assembly Tarek Fetiti, met in a virtual session to vote on the end of the exceptional measures in force since 25 July. On the same day, Kais Saied dissolved Parliament, which the Constitution prohibits during the period when the state of emergency is applied, and threatened the deputies with legal action.

On 6 April, Kais Saied announced that the elections would be held by a two-round majority single-member constituency. On 5 September, he indicated that the electoral law would be drawn up taking into account the recommendations of the supporters of the 25 July process, and that the rest of the political class would be excluded from this process. On 25 July 2022, the new Constitution was adopted by constitutional referendum with 94.60% of the vote. The new electoral law was published by decree on 15 September. The suspension of parliament was extended pending the investiture of the new legislature. In October 2024, a few days before the presidential election, several demonstrations took place in Tunis, with protesters calling for a boycott of the election.

== Candidacy requirements ==
The Independent High Authority for Elections has announced the following candidacy requirements:

- Be a voter registered on the electoral register.
- Be Tunisian without any other nationality born to a Tunisian father and mother with paternal and maternal grandparents who are all Tunisians.
- Be of the Muslim religion.
- Be at least 40 years old at the time of submitting the candidacy.
- Enjoy all their civil and political rights.
- Not have held the office of President of the Republic for two consecutive or separate terms.
- Not be subject to one of the following prohibitions: loss of the quality of elector and loss of the right to candidacy resulting from a conviction for the crimes mentioned in Articles 161 and 163 of the electoral law and Article 30 of the Penal Code.
- Have the required sponsorships from the following:
  - Ten members of the Assembly of People's Representatives or the National Council of Regions and Districts.
  - Forty presidents of local authorities, whether local, regional, or municipal councils; or
  - Ten thousand voters registered on the electoral lists spread across at least ten constituencies, each constituency having to have at least 500 voters.

== Candidates ==
=== Expected or not having submitted their candidacy ===
- Hatem Boulabiar, former candidate in 2019, announced his candidacy in November 2020.
- Adel Ltifi, an activist, announced in March 2022 that he would be a candidate.
- Nizar Chaari, former founder of the New Chartage movement, announced his candidacy in October 2022.
- Lotfi Mraïhi, founder of the Republican People's Union and candidate in 2019, announced his probable candidacy in January 2023 and confirmed it in April 2024.
- Fadhel Abdelkefi, former president of the Afek Tounes and former Minister of Finance, announced in February 2023 that he could be a candidate.
- Lazhar Akremi, journalist, lawyer and political activist, announced his candidacy during a judicial hearing in February 2023.
- Olfa Hamdi, president of the Third Republic Party, announced her candidacy in November 2023.
- Issam Chebbi, secretary general of Republican Party imprisoned since 25 February 2023, was proposed by his party as a candidate in March 2024.
- Dhaker Lahidheb, cardiologist and former leader of the Democratic Current, announced his intention to run in April 2024.
- Actress Najoura Miled announced her intention to run in April 2024.
- Malek Saïhi, secretary general of the Young Tunisian Patriots movement and former candidate in the 2022–23 parliamentary election in the Nabeul constituency, announced his candidacy in July 2024.
- Kamel Akrout, former first national security adviser under President Beji Caid Essebsi, announced his candidacy in July 2024.
- Hichem Meddeb, former spokesperson for the Ministry of the Interior, announced his candidacy in July 2024.
- Issam Guerfel, lawyer and former member of the Free Destourian Party, announced his candidacy in July 2024.
- Azmi Belhaj Ahmed, PhD in chemistry, announced his candidacy in July 2024.
- Karim Gharbi, known as K2Rhym, former rapper and son-in-law of President Zine El Abidine Ben Ali, ran as an independent candidate. However, he claimed that the authorities did not provide him with an extract from his criminal record, and he did not submit his application.

=== Submitted candidacy ===
The submission of applications to the Independent High Authority for Elections (ISIE) began on 29 July 2024 and ended on 6 August. The preliminary list of applications was announced on 11 August after the examination of the applications and the final list announced on 3 September.

- Fathi Ben Khemaïes Krimi, a day laborer who also filed his candidacy in 2019, submitted his candidacy on 29 July.
- Leila Hammami, an economics professor, advisor to international organizations, and civil society activist who announced her candidacy in July, filed her candidacy on 31 July.
- Yosri Slimane, a businessman, filed his candidacy on 2 August.
- Abir Moussi, president of the Free Destourian Party, announced in February 2022 that she would be her party's candidate. In detention since October 2023, her candidacy was filed by her defense committee on 3 August without a criminal record or sponsorships, following the ISIE's refusal to provide the necessary copy.
- Kais Saied, the outgoing President, having officially announced his candidacy for his own re-election on 20 July filed it on 5 August.
- Ayachi Zammel, leader of Azimoun, announced his intention to run in April 2024 and filed his candidacy on 5 August.
- Mondher Zenaidi, in exile in France, several times a minister under the presidency of Zine El Abidine Ben Ali and a candidate in 2014, officially announced his candidacy on 4 July and filed his candidacy on 5 August.
- Abdellatif Mekki, former Minister of Health and founder of the Work and Achievement movement, announced in August 2022 that he could run.
- Zouhair Maghzaoui, Secretary General of the People's Movement, filed his candidacy on 6 August.
- Safi Saïd, founder of the Gardens of Bees party and candidate in 2014 and 2019, announced his candidacy in April 2024 and filed his application on 6 August.
- Imed Daïmi, vice-president of the Movement Party.

=== Disqualifications and arrests ===
On 4 July 2024 the ISIE announced changes to the rules regulating candidates to the presidential elections by issuing Ordinance 544 in which they raised the age limit of presidential candidates to 40 years old compared to the age limit of 35 years old currently enacted by the electoral law as well as adding other constraining requirements exceeding the electoral law requirements. The ordinances were contested by multiple political parties such as the Third Republic Party and Attayar Party. Both parties filed lawsuits against the electoral committee for the annulment of Ordinance 544. A total of 17 candidates applied to run in the presidential election.

On 19 July 2024 a court barred Lotfi Mraïhi, the president of the Republican People's Union, from standing in elections for life after convicting him of vote-buying involving the 2019 presidential election. He was also sentenced to eight months' imprisonment. Several candidates and campaign workers were also arrested and sentenced to prison during the candidate registration process, including Abir Moussi, who received a two-year sentence for charges of spreading false news shortly after registering her candidacy on 3 August, as well as Nizar Chaari, who received an eight-month prison term on 5 August and had three of his campaign workers arrested on charges of forging signatures. Four staffers of Karim Gharbi's presidential campaign were also arrested on charges of buying signatures of endorsement.

Due to the minimum age rule, Olfa Hamdi was automatically banned from participating. K2Rhym was convicted to four years in prison in absentia and banned from voting and running for the presidency for life. Safi Said was arrested on 22 August 2024 and placed in pre-trial detention. On 2 September Ayachi Zammel was arrested on suspicion of falsifying endorsements shortly before his candidacy was confirmed by the ISIE. On 18 September, he was sentenced to 20 months imprisonment for the charges. Despite this, he has pledged to continue his presidential campaign. He was sentenced to another six months' imprisonment on related charges on 25 September and an additional 12 years' imprisonment in four related cases on 1 October. On 27 September, the Assembly of the Representatives of the People voted to amend the country's election law by preventing the judiciary from interfering with decisions of the ISIE.

=== Successful candidacy ===
The preliminary applications were announced on 10 August. These were those of the incumbent president Kais Saied, Zouhair Maghzaoui and Ayachi Zammel. The other candidates saw their applications rejected, generally for a lack of sponsorships. Many of them and those who had given up running were prosecuted for suspicion of false sponsorships. On 2 September, the electoral authority confirmed the validation of the three applications, three other applications, those of Mondher Zenaidi, Abdellatif Mekki and Imed Daïmi, who had been reinstated by the Administrative Court, were however rejected. This decision is however contrary to the Constitution, which stipulates that the decisions of the Administrative Court cannot be appealed and that the role of the Independent High Authority for Elections is only technical. The president of the ISIE claimed that the Administrative Court is not competent and accused the latter of failing to notify them of the decision to reinstate the candidates, which the Administrative Court denied. The decision was denounced by the Tunisian General Labour Union and Human Rights Watch.

Daïmi was referred by the ISIE for perjury regarding the failure to renounce his French nationality. In response, Zenaidi announced that he was filing an appeal with the Administrative Court. On 14 September, the latter ordered the ISIE to accept these candidacies. On 20 September, deputies submitted a draft amendment to the electoral law, to remove the Administrative Court's prerogatives to validate the election results, in anticipation that it, independent unlike other jurisdictions, would invalidate the results of the presidential election. Entrusting the powers of the Administrative Court to the Court of Appeal, the law was adopted on 27 September.

Candidate (name and age) and political party	Main political mandates exercised	Other information
Kais Saied (66 years); Independent	President of the Republic (since 2019)	Incumbent President
Ayachi Zammel (47 years); Azimoun	Member of Parliament for Kébili constituency (2014–2021)	President of Azimoun
Zouhair Maghzaoui (59 years); People's Movement	Member of Parliament for Siliana constituency (2019–2021)	Secretary General of the People's Movement.

== Campaign ==
=== Boycott ===
The opposition was divided between boycotting and voting for an opposition candidate. A candidate from the National Salvation Front can initially be presented by the coalition if the conditions are met. However, in April 2024, it announced a boycott of the election, which it described as an "electoral farce". The Workers' Party announced in July that it was boycotting the elections and would not present a candidate. On 2 October, five left-wing parties announced a boycott of the elections, including the Workers' Party, the Socialist Party, Democratic Forum for Labour and Liberties, Social Democratic Path and Democratic Modernist Pole. For their part, the Democratic Current and the Free Destourian Party announced that they would reject the results in advance. On 3 October, Ennahda strongly criticized the electoral process and its legitimacy, without giving any voting instructions. Former President Moncef Marzouki also called for a boycott.

=== Imprisonment of Ayachi Zammel ===
On 4 September, Ayachi Zammel was arrested and placed in pretrial detention two days later on charges of false sponsorship. After obtaining his provisional release on 5 September, he was immediately arrested and sentenced to twenty months in prison on 18 September. On 25 September, a new six-month prison sentence for "falsification of documents" was handed down against Zammel. On 1 October, he was sentenced to an additional twelve years in prison, a decision, as well as the rejection and imprisonment of other candidates, which were denounced by Human Rights Watch. This accumulation of summary sentences was interpreted as judicial relentlessness reflecting the government's panic over his electoral potential, with many opponents considering voting for him, despite his lack of notoriety, the latter having initially spared him from a rejection of his candidacy.

=== Saied ===
With little involvement in the campaign, Kais Saied enjoyed the support of the 25 July movement, which campaigned for him. According to political scientist Khadija Mohsen Finan, the challenge for the outgoing president is a decent turnout. Moreover, although his authoritarianism is tarnishing his image, he cares little about it as he capitalizes on nationalist, sovereignist and anti-Western rhetoric. In return, this discourse reaches a large part of the population, who see him as a man of integrity.

== Conduct ==
Voting was held in 5,000 polling stations from 8:00 a.m. to 6:00 p.m. Around 9.7 million people were eligible to vote. On 7 October, the ISIE announced the results, Kais Saied was re-elected president of Tunisia with 90.69% but on a turnout of 28.8%, the lowest since 2011, with Ayachi Zammel winning 7.3% and Zouhair Maghzaoui winning 1.9%.

== Observers ==
The ISIE banned the groups I Watch and Mourakiboun from monitoring the election, alleging that they had received funds from overseas in a suspicious manner. In response, I Watch said it received foreign funding through legal means, while Mourakiboun called the claims "baseless".

== Preliminary results ==
Candidate	Party	Votes	%
Kais Saied	Independent	2,438,954	90.69
Ayachi Zammel	Azimoun	197,551	7.35
Zouhair Maghzaoui	People's Movement	52,903	1.97
Total		2,689,408	100.00
Valid votes		2,689,408	95.76
Invalid votes		84,953	3.02
Blank votes		34,187	1.22
Total votes		2,808,548	100.00
Registered voters/turnout		9,753,217	28.80
Source: Independent High Authority for Elections (preliminary)

=== Voter demographics ===
SIGMA Conseil exit polling for state broadcaster Télévision Tunisienne suggested the following demographic breakdown.

Voter demographics in percentage
Social group	Saied	Zammel	Maghzaoui	Lead
Exit poll result	89.2	6.9	3.9	82.3
Preliminary result	90.7	7.4	1.2	83.3
Gender
Men	88.3	7.6	4.1	80.7
Women	90.4	5.9	3.6	84.5
Age
Younger than 35	87.3	8.5	4.3	78.8
35–45	87.0	8.0	5.0	79.0
46–60	90.0	6.5	3.4	83.5
Older than 60	92.7	4.2	3.1	88.5
Level of education
No education	90.1	4.0	6.0	86.1
Lower education	93.1	3.7	3.2	89.4
Secondary education	89.6	6.6	3.8	83.0
Higher education	86.1	10.0	3.9	76.1

=== By governorate ===
Preliminary results by governorate
Governorate	Saied		Zammel		Maghzaoui	
Governorate	Votes	%	Votes	%	Votes	%
Ariana	111,056	84.56%	17,091	13.01%	3,193	2.43%
Béja	71,572	94.92%	2,758	3.66%	1,076	1.43%
Ben Arous	137,576	88.02%	15,356	9.83%	3,362	2.15%
Bizerte	111,672	92.71%	7,223	5.79%	1,879	1.51%
Gabès	68,031	88.82%	6,497	8.48%	2,064	2.69%
Gafsa	69,804	92.63%	3,797	5.04%	1,753	2.33%
Jendouba	89,720	95.97%	2,639	2.82%	1,131	1.21%
Kairouan	117,399	94.92%	5,079	4.11%	1,202	0.97%
Kasserine	103,943	95.17%	3,846	3.52%	1,434	1.31%
Kebili	33,311	86.89%	2,526	6.59%	2,498	6.52%
Kef	58,126	95.49%	1,937	3.18%	806	1.32%
Mahdia	91,344	93.99%	4,418	4.55%	1,424	1.47%
Manouba	85,947	92.46%	5,593	6.02%	1,420	1.53%
Medenine	70,974	88.49%	6,962	8.68%	2,272	2.83%
Monastir	128,364	93.04%	7,667	5.56%	1,929	1.40%
Nabeul	198,517	93.35%	10,937	5.14%	3,198	1.50%
Sfax	215,856	87.89%	24,307	9.90%	5,447	2.22%
Sidi Bouzid	99,801	95.74%	2,777	2.66%	1,666	1.60%
Siliana	56,018	92.81%	3,719	6.16%	623	1.03%
Sousse	138,626	91.17%	10,803	7.10%	2,628	1.73%
Tataouine	18,075	87.21%	2,092	10.09%	559	2.70%
Tozeur	27,043	93.20%	1,414	4.87%	560	1.93%
Tunis	207,458	85.65%	28,865	11.92%	5,897	2.43%
Zaghouan	48,014	95.09%	1,863	3.69%	618	1.22%
Diaspora	76,707	77.99%	17,385	17,68%	4,264	4.34%
Total	2,438,954	90.69%	197,551	7.35%	52,903	1.97%
Source: Independent High Authority for Elections

=== Overseas ===
Preliminary results per collection centre in the Tunisian diaspora
Collection centre	Saied		Zammel		Maghzaoui	
Collection centre	Votes	%	Votes	%	Votes	%
Africa	486	68.64%	174	24.58%	48	6.78%
Americas	2,411	57.40%	1,536	36.57%	253	6.02%
Arab countries	8,415	78.81%	1,862	17.44%	401	3.76%
Italy	13,120	93.69%	686	4.90%	198	1.41%
Germany	4,188	70.30%	1,412	23.70%	357	5.99%
Asia and Australia	169	72.53%	43	18.45%	21	9.01%
Rest of Europe	7,048	71.29%	2,329	23.56%	510	5.16%
France 1	17,987	67.16%	7,056	26.35%	1,738	6.49%
France 2	10,734	85.62%	1,371	10.94%	432	3.45%
France 3	12,149	90.86%	916	6.85%	306	2.29%
Total	76,707	77.99%	17,385	17,68%	4,264	4.34%
Source: Independent High Authority for Elections
