= K2Rhym =

Tunisian rapper and politician

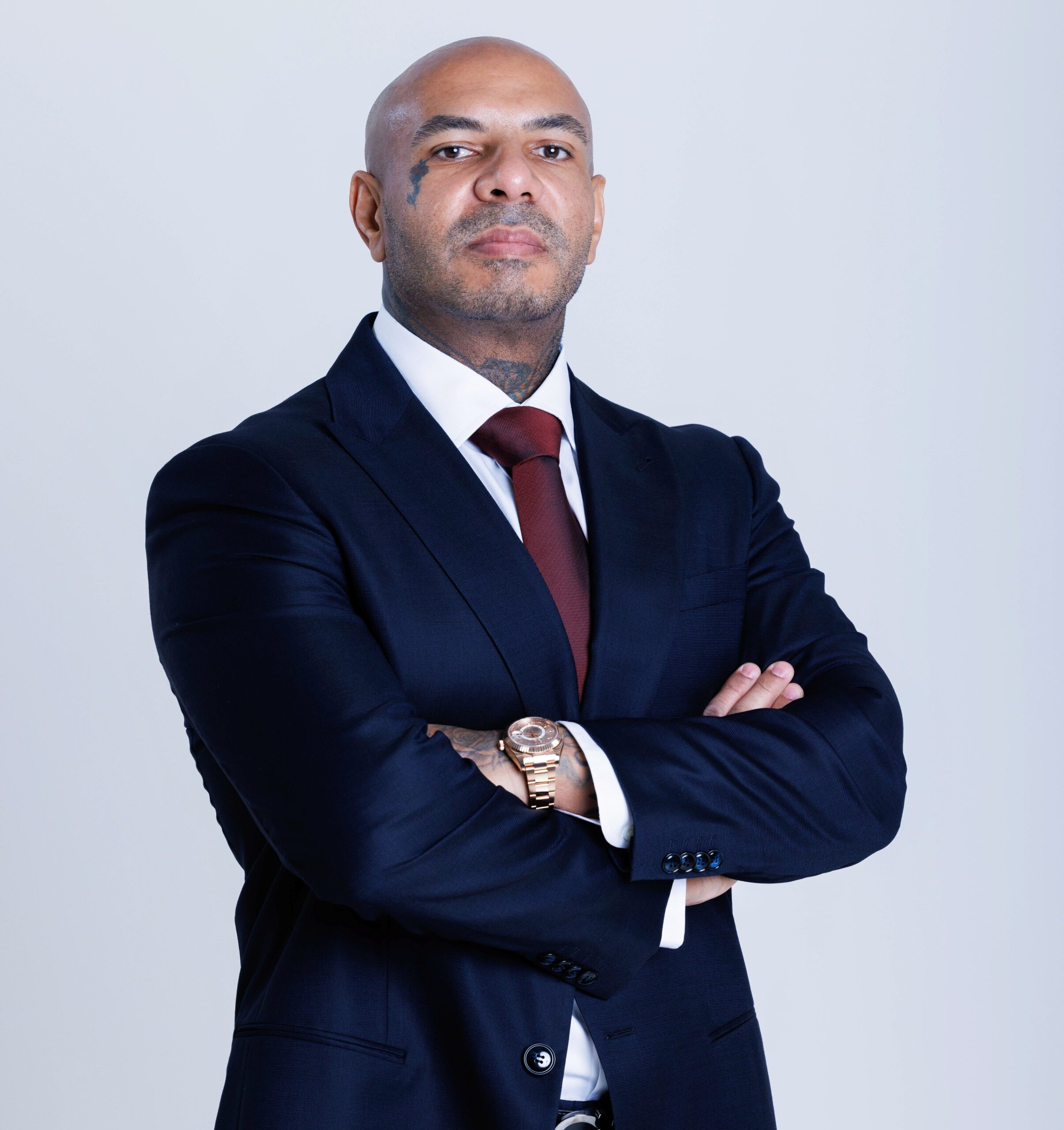
- K2Rhym in 2026
- Born: Karim Gharbi; October 13, 1980 (age 46); Tunis, Tunisia
- Occupations: Rapper; Record executive; Politician; Entrepreneur
- Years active: 2005–2026

Karim Gharbi (Arabic: كريم الغربي; born 13 October 1980), known professionally as K2 or K2Rhym, is a Tunisian rapper, entrepreneur, and former presidential candidate. He became active in the early 2000s with Arabic and French-language hip-hop recordings and has collaborated with artists including Snoop Dogg and DJ Khaled. He later founded K2 Meta, a consulting firm focused on technology, and was involved in charitable initiatives in Tunisia.

In 2024, amid Tunisia's increasingly authoritarian political climate, he was sentenced in absentia to four years in prison and was permanently disqualified from running in presidential elections and from voting following his presidential.

== Early life and music career ==
Gharbi was born on October 13, 1980, in Tunis, Tunisia, and grew up in the Ksar Saïd district. He moved to Marseille, France at the age of fifteen, where he began his music career under the name K2Rhym (also stylized as K2).

He signed with EMI France and later Virgin Records Middle East. In 2012, he was nominated for the MTV Europe Music Award for Best Middle East Act. He also hosted the television program Urban Fen on Hannibal TV in Tunisia.

Gharbi's music career includes collaborations with various artists, particularly from the American hip-hop scene, such as Snoop Dogg, DJ Khaled, and Fat Joe. In 2019, under the name K2, he released the single One Love, featuring contributions from Snoop Dogg, Rick Ross, DJ Khaled, Brazilian singer Kevinho, and former footballer Ronaldinho Gaúcho.

As of 2024, Gharbi has amassed a following on social media, with approximately 2.4 million subscribers on Facebook, 1.5 million on Instagram, and 100,000 on YouTube.

== Business activities ==
Gharbi later moved to the United Arab Emirates and established a company called K2 Meta, which focused on consulting and investments in technologies such as blockchain and Web3.

== Political involvement ==
K2Rhym on the cover of Tunivisions, in March 2015.

=== Philanthropy ===
In 2017, Gharbi was appointed a goodwill ambassador by the UN.

Around 2020, Gharbi began speaking in media outlets on issues related to public services and the economy in Tunisia. He was also active in philanthropy, working with The Voice of the Child [La Voix de l'enfant], donating food for Eid al-Adha, donating medical supplies during the COVID-19 pandemic, and helping to renovate schools in underserved regions such as Kasserine. In January 2021, during an ongoing COVID-19 pandemic, he claimed to have reached an agreement with Mengjia Gao, a representative of the Chinese government, to start delivery of Chinese vaccines to Tunisia. Chinese embassy in Tunisia later released a statement, saying they do not know about the deal.

=== Presidential candidacy and political persecution ===
In 2023, a year before the coming presidential elections, a poll by Sigma Conseil ranked him as the third most popular candidate among voters for the presidential post, with only then president Kais Saied and political activist Safi Saïd having more votes. At the time, Gharbi had not declared his intention to run for president.

He announced his candidacy for the 2024 presidential election in July 2024. After that, the government opened an investigation for alleged purchase of endorsements after arresting four women who collected signatures for him. Shortly before the registration deadline, he reported that the Ministry of Justice had refused to provide the required criminal record certificate (Bulletin n°3), thus preventing his formal registration.

On 15 August 2024, a court in Jendouba convicted him in absentia of purchasing sponsorship signatures and sentenced him to four years in prison, along with a fine and a lifetime ban on running in presidential elections and on voting. The court also sentenced Jendouba's municipal president to one year in prison and a 1,000-dinar fine (about €300) The lawyer for the head of Jendouba's local council says no evidence has been produced showing any signature collection, and denies that the accused had any connection to Karim Gharbi. Earlier, the same court had already imposed prison sentences ranging from two to four years on four women who had been collecting signatures for Gharbi.

Human Rights Watch included his case in its reporting on electoral practices in Tunisia. The report stated that the electoral commission rejected 14 candidates, with at least 8 having been sentenced to prison terms and/or having been banned from running for the presidency again. In contrast, for the 2019 election, the electoral commission approved 26 candidates across the political spectrum.

== Personal life ==
In January 2019, Gharbi married Nesrine Ben Ali, daughter of former Tunisian President Zine El Abidine Ben Ali. The ceremony took place in Saudi Arabia and was attended by the former president. The couple divorced in October 2019.

He is currently based in Dubai, United Arab Emirates, where he manages his company.

== Discography ==
Studio albums

- Chroniques (2007)

=== Selected singles and collaborations ===
- Immortal (feat. Snoop Dogg)
- La Fiesta (feat. Reda Taliani)
- Oriental Wedding (feat. Akil & Big Ali)
