= Human rights in Tunisia =

The issue of human rights in Tunisia, is complex, contradictory, and, in some regards, confusing in the wake of the Tunisian revolution that began in January 2011 and overthrew the longstanding rule of Zine El Abidine Ben Ali. While the immediate months after the revolution were characterized by significant improvements in the status of human rights, some of those advances have since been reversed. The situation remains in a state of flux, with different observers providing virtually irreconcilable accounts of the current status of human rights in that country.

For most of the time since Freedom House began issuing its Freedom in the World ratings, Tunisia ranked near the bottom of the ratings; it consistently garnered "Not Free" rankings in all but a few years. Tunisia was upgraded to "Partly Free" after the revolution (often associated with the so-called Arab Spring, with its political rights rating improved from 7 to 3 (with 7 the worst and 1 the best) and its civil liberties rating going from 5 to 4. As of 2016, Tunisia has been upgraded to "Free"—the only Arab country to receive this rating.

== Pre-revolutionary situation and post-revolutionary developments ==
A U.S. State Department report, issued in April 2011, depicts the status of human rights in that country on the eve of the revolution, citing "restrictions on freedom of speech, press and association", the "severe" intimidation of journalists, reprisals against critical of the government, questionable conduct of elections, and reports of arbitrary arrest, widespread corruption, official extortion, government influence over the judiciary, extremely poor prison conditions, and the abuse and torture of detainees and prisoners, involving a wide range of torture methods. Defendants did not enjoy the right to a speedy trial, and access to evidence was often restricted; in cases involving family and inheritance law, judges often ignored civil law and applied sharia instead.

Although the principal cause of the revolt was a frustration over the country's dire economic situation, many leaders of the revolution were longtime human-rights activists and many participants shared their hope of replacing autocracy with a democratic government and a civil society in which human rights were respected. As Christopher de Bellaigue noted in an article posted at the New York Review of Books website on December 18, 2012, Tunisia's new constitution is, "give or take a few vague references to Islam, strikingly secular. (It does not mention the Sharia, for instance, and guarantees equal rights for all Tunisian men and women.)"

The revolution initiated what Amnesty International has described as "a wholesale process of reform" under which "political prisoners, including prisoners of conscience, were released; legal restrictions on political parties and NGOs were eased; the Department of State Security (DSS), notorious for torturing detainees with impunity, was dissolved; Tunisia became party to additional international human rights treaties; and a new National Constituent Assembly was elected with a mandate to draft and agree a new Constitution."

In July 2011, the UN opened its first human-rights office in north Africa. "The whole world watched with amazement and growing respect as Tunisians kept demanding their rights, refusing to be cowed by the repression, the arrests, the torture and all the injuries and tragic loss of life that occurred," the High Commissioner for Human Rights Navi Pillay said at the official opening of the office. "The impact of these actions, on Tunisia itself, on the wider region, and indeed all across the world is hard to measure and is far from completed. But it has unquestionably been enormous and truly inspirational." She noted that in the previous three weeks, Tunisia had ratified four major treaties: the Optional Protocol to the International Covenant on Civil and Political Rights, the Optional Protocol to the Convention against Torture, the UN Convention on Enforced Disappearances, and the Rome Statute for the International Criminal Court.

Since the revolution, however, according to de Bellaigue, "tensions have risen sharply between the three partners" in the post-revolutionary government, "not least because the divisions between Islamists and secularists that the coalition was designed to bridge, or at least camouflage, are now obvious ... increasingly, secularists and religious conservatives have been drawn into a vigorous culture war, in which the former invoke human rights, and the latter, Islamic law." Moreover, under the current regime, as Amnesty International had pointed out, there have been "continuing human rights violations," with security forces using excessive force against protesters, who have also been mistreated while in detention.

The UN Special Rapporteur on Truth, Justice, Reparations and Guarantees of Non-Recurrence, Pablo de Greiff, urged Tunisian authorities in November 2012 to put human rights front and center in their transitional efforts. In December 2012, at a World Human Rights Day ceremony in Carthage attended by several top Tunisian government officials, President Marzouki, while complaining about "an excessive freedom of expression of some media," lamented that "the path towards the construction of a human rights Tunisia is still difficult and full of traps." One difficulty was that many Tunisians consider the new constitution and the Universal Declaration of Human Rights to be at odds with Islamic values.

Marzouki admitted that security officials need to undergo a radical change of mindset, while Speaker of the National Constituent Assembly Mustapha Ben Jaafar expressed thanks for the help given to the new regime by a number of human rights organisations. Problems aside, said Ben Jaafar, Tunisia's democratization was "on the right track" and the country was "moving towards a consensus on the new Constitution." The President of the National Union of Tunisian Judges, Raoudha Labidi, however, charged that the exclusion of judges from the human-rights event represented a denial of judges' pre-revolutionary struggle, "adding that the judicial service is the guarantor of human rights and individual freedoms in the country."

In a December 2012 article, Dorra Megdiche Meziou took a cynical view of the Human Rights Day event. While acknowledging "the historic achievements of the incumbent President of the Republic, Moncef Marzouki, as a human rights activist," noting that he had been on "the steering committee of the Arab Organization for Human Rights," belonged to "the Tunisian branch of Amnesty International," served as "president of the Arab Committee for Human Rights," and "co-founded the National Council for Liberties in Tunisia," and while further acknowledging that Mustapha Ben Jaafar, too, had helped advance human rights as "a main figure in the Tunisian opposition," Meziou complained that "serious violations and infringements of human rights" remain in today's Tunisia, and called on "these former activists of human rights who are now in power to get to work and translate their words into actions."

In October 2012, Amnesty International said that Tunisia's revolutionary reforms had been eroded, with recent months seeing "new restrictions on freedom of expression targeting journalists, artists, critics of the government, writers and bloggers," leading to a journalists' strike. Also, protesters complaining that reforms have not been instituted quickly enough, "have been met with unnecessary and excessive force." In addition, Human Rights Watch documented the government's failure to look into attacks on political activists by radical Islamic groups. Amnesty International admitted to "doubt" regarding the commitment of Tunisia's new leaders to reform, saying that "Tunisia is at a crossroads" and calling for "urgent steps ... to realise the rights and freedoms for which Tunisians fought so tenaciously and bravely in late 2010 and early 2011."

In 2014, President Moncef Marzouki established Tunisia's Truth and Dignity Commission, as a key part of creating a national reconciliation.

In December 2025, Tunisian police arrested Chaima Issa, a member of the National Salvation Front, in Tunis to serve a 20-year prison sentence. An appeals court recently handed down sentences of up to 45 years in prison to several opposition leaders accused of plotting to overthrow the president.

== Basic rights ==
Tunisia, according to de Bellaigue, "has taken important strides toward a more representative and accountable political system. The institutions are working, albeit imperfectly. Freedom of speech is being observed to a degree that is unprecedented in the country’s modern history. To be sure, secularists and Islamists exert themselves to ensure that their view of the world carries the day, but I have spoken to hard-liners in both camps who accept that, for as long as the majority opposes them, compromise is inevitable."

After the revolution, moreover, Tunisia became the first nation in the Arab world "to legally enshrine gender parity in the electoral rolls." According to Freedom House, the October 2011 elections "represented a dramatic improvement in electoral freedoms and practices. Under the former regime of Zine el-Abidine Ben Ali, the cabinet, much of the legislature, and many regional officials had been appointed directly by the president. Elections were tightly controlled, and term limits were extended to allow Ben Ali to remain in power. By contrast, in the 2011 elections, all 217 members of the Constituent Assembly were directly elected through party-list voting in 33 multimember constituencies, and voters were able to choose from political parties representing a wide range of ideologies and political philosophies, including Islamist and secularist groups. Many of the parties that competed were excluded from political participation under Ben Ali."

The Tunisian regime has been criticised for its draconian policy on recreational drug use, for instance, issuing automatic 1-year prison sentences for consuming cannabis. Prisons are overcrowded and drug offenders represent nearly a third of the prison population.

In January 2021, thousands of young people were arrested and protests were violently dispersed by security forces, who also tortured protesters in custody. Such level of suffering should be shunned by Tunisian President Kais Saied, who publicly committed to respecting and protecting human rights.

The Amnesty International reported that high-profile Tunisian journalists, parliamentarians, and other political figures, including critics and perceived opponents of President Kais Saied have been targeted for opposing the government. President Saied repeatedly attacked the independence of the judiciary, and granted himself broad powers to intervene in the appointment and dismissal of judges and prosecutors. New legislation contained provisions that would significantly restrict the work and funding of civil society organizations.

== Legal system ==
=== Persons under arrest ===
Post-revolutionary amendments to Tunisia's law on torture brought it more into line with international law. Though there continue to be accusations of torture, such incidents are far less common than before the revolution. Most such accusations concern the beating of protestors at demonstrations or at police stations. Freedom House notes that human-rights reforms have not taken place in the law-enforcement sector as extensively as in other spheres of Tunisian society. And Amnesty International has noted that while Tunisia's post-revolutionary Interior Ministry planned sweeping police reforms, it has not addressed pre-revolutionary human-rights violations by the police and others in authority.

Meziou noted in December 2012 that the post-revolutionary government was arresting people but not bringing them to trial. "Some of the officials from the former regime have been under arrest for almost two years and they are still awaiting trial, which does not seem imminent" she wrote. Also, young demonstrators in various places around the country had been arrested and were awaiting trial under "miserable conditions."

A report published by Human Rights Watch in April 2025 found that the arbitrary detention in Tunisia had increased significantly since President Said Kaies took power in 2021.

=== Trials ===
Before the revolution, according to Freedom House, Tunisia's judiciary "was carefully managed by the executive branch, which controlled the appointment and assignment of judges. Trials of suspected Islamists, human rights activists, and journalists were typically condemned as grossly unfair and politically biased by domestic and international observers." While such abuses "declined significantly in 2011," and the judiciary underwent "some changes," the courts, like law-enforcement agencies, "have been criticized for lagging behind other institutions in their pace of reform, and there is a significant backlog of cases related to abuses by members of the former regime and security forces that have yet to be officially addressed."

At a series of workshops offered in 2012 by the International Bar Association's Human Rights Institute, the International Legal Assistance Consortium, and the CEELI Institute, the majority of Tunisian judges were provided with training about human rights and the role of judges in a democratic society. In October 2012, however, Human Rights Watch criticized Tunisia's justice minister for dismissing 75 judges, calling on Tunisia's parliament to "urgently pass a law to create an independent body to govern the discipline and dismissal of judges in an impartial and transparent manner."

=== Prison ===
Prison conditions in Tunisia have long been considered extremely substandard, with overcrowding and violence among the major problems. "Hygiene was extremely poor, and prisoners rarely had access to showers and washing facilities," according to a U.S. State Department report issued in early 2011. Typically, up to fifty inmates were confined in "a single 194-square-foot cell, and as many as 140 prisoners shared a 323-square-foot cell. Most prisoners were forced to share beds or sleep on the floor. Current and former prisoners reported that the lack of basic facilities forced inmates to share a single water and toilet facility with more than 100 cellmates, creating serious sanitation problems. Contagious diseases, particularly scabies, were widespread, and prisoners did not have access to adequate medical care."

A U.S. State Department report issued in early 2012, following the Arab Spring movement, described prison conditions as "varied" and noted that while two prisons observed in February by Human Rights Watch had been overcrowded, the situation was expected to improve as the result of an amnesty that "freed thousands of political prisoners detained during the Ben Ali era." The report indicated, however, that up-to-date, comprehensive information about post-revolutionary prison conditions was hard to come by.

Although the death penalty has not technically been abolished, post-revolutionary Tunisia maintains the moratorium on executions that was put in place in 1991. The death penalty remains a legal punishment in Tunisia for many serious crimes including aggravated murder, premeditated murder, terrorism, aggravated rape, kidnapping, attacks against the external security of the state, kidnapping and sequestration resulting in death, treason, espionage, arson, military offenses, attempt of a death-eligible offense and assault on a judge on duty, with threat or use of a weapon The last person to be executed in Tunisia was Jihad Matiki, who was executed by hanging in 1991 for murder and terrorism.

Unlike many European countries, African countries, and other Western states, there is no possibility of parole for any person sentenced to life imprisonment. Life imprisonment in Tunisia means perpetual imprisonment for the rest of the convict's natural life, and always imposed without the possibility of parole. Life imprisonment in Tunisia is a mandatory punishment for terrorism, aircraft hijacking, assassination, aggravated murder, and aggravated rape. It is a possible punishment for drug trafficking, serious drug offenses, and serious military crimes.

In 2016, a Geneva-based non-profit organization, Euro-Mediterranean Human Rights Monitor, reported on the status of Tunisian prisons and jails. In 2015, there were approximately 25,000 inmates of incarceration facilities in Tunisia, including "preventive detention" centers and jails. By 2016, the number of prisoners and detainees had increased to 53,300 individuals, divided among 19 preventive centers and eight jails. Overcrowded prison facilities exceeded capacity by 150 to 200%, causing tension and violence among inmates and increasing the spread of disease. 53 percent of the inmates are imprisoned or detained due to drug sale or use. 2,000 prisoners have been convicted of committing terrorist attacks, but they are housed with inmates who are awaiting trial as well as those who have committed petty crimes. This commonly leads to radicalization. This whole situation has made Tunisia the Arab country with the fourth largest number of inmates, with 212 per 100,000 of the entire country's population. Emergency law imposed in Tunisia has consumed about 80% of human resources used in the process of rehabilitation.

== Civil liberties ==
=== Freedom of speech ===
Post-revolutionary press laws are considerably more liberal than the legislation they replaced. While it is no longer a crime to defame or offend public officials or institutions, defamation in general remains a crime, although one that is not punishable by imprisonment. Defamation of recognized religions also remains a crime, as does "distributing false information", a charge on which the pre-revolutionary government prosecuted dissidents and human rights activists. This charge was used by the post-revolutionary government on May 29, 2012, to detain police official Samir Feriani, who had accused high-ranking government officials in the death of protesters during the revolution.

The new government has also failed in some cases to protect individuals exercising their free speech. On June 29, 2012, when dozens of Muslims charged into a screening in Tunis of a movie about atheism, police failed to respond. In October 2012, a prosecutor announced plans to investigate a complaint against Nessma TV for broadcasting a film that Muslims considered offensive. Although persons who vandalized and attempted to set fire to the home of Nessma TV co-owner Nebil Karaoui were arrested, they were "detained only briefly and not charged," whereas Karaoui and two Nessma TV employees are still awaiting trial on charges of "undermining sacred values."

In December 2012, Human Rights Watch called on Tunisia's justice minister to "ensure the immediate release of Sami Fehri, the director of the privately owned Attounissia TV channel," who remained in prison after Tunisia's highest court, the Court of Cassation, had ordered his immediate release on November 28. Although Fehri had been charged with embezzlement, Fehri claimed that the real reason for his arrest was his broadcasting of a satirical show about leading Tunisian politicians. "Refusing to carry out a ruling by the highest judicial authority undermines the rule of law in Tunisia," said Eric Goldstein of Human Rights Watch.

Academic freedom, which was seriously limited before the revolution, has been significantly expanded.

Human Rights Watch criticized two journalists trial in the military courts in 2016. Both journalists can be jailed for up to three years under article 91 of the code of military justice, which criminalizes offenses against the dignity, reputation, or morale of the army.

=== Freedom of religion ===
In 2013, Freedom House noted that Tunisia's "small populations of Jews and Christians have generally been free to practice their faiths," and that following the revolution "conservative and fundamentalist Muslims had more freedom to express their beliefs without state interference and to openly discuss the role religion should play in the public sphere."

In 2023, the country was scored 3 out of 4 for religious freedom.

== Racism and discrimination ==
=== Recent past ===
Fifteen percent of the country identifies as black and many of them face prejudiced on a daily basis. Words like "monkey", "slave", and "dirty negro" are used to dehumanize the black population. Physical assault is also prevalent for the black community. On August 23, 2018, several young Tunisians started to throw rocks at a pregnant woman because of race. The situation soon turned into a fight and several people were injured Ghayda Jeanne Thabet, a communication officer of a minority support group, explained to reporters after the attack "This is not the first time that such a racist assault takes place in Tunisia; it happens often," The Tunisian Government denies that racism exists within the country and yet studies have proven otherwise. A study conducted in April and May 2018 by Afrobarometer recorded data from 12 hundred respondents. The table below shows some of the results.

	Black Tunisians %	Other Tunisians%
Rural	39	31
Own a Radio	51	66
Own a Computer	38	50
Own a Car	46	61
Completed Primary School	52	62
Unemployed	42	25

=== Laws ===
Tunisia in the last decade has gone from completely denying the existence of racism within the country to now passing laws criminalizing it. The creation of the law began in 2011 after the Tunisian Revolution. The Revolution was a huge civil rights push that ended up removing the current president Zine El Abidine Ben Ali and creating a democratic state with free elections. While the new constitution contained several Articles, it never addressed specifically to the form of racism that much of the black population faced on a daily basis. Article 21 states "All citizens, male and female, have equal rights and duties, and are equal before the law without any discrimination." According to the Tunisian government, this law refers to the equality of all people in value, not the equality of people of base on color and race. Article 23 states "The state protects human dignity and physical integrity, and prohibits mental and physical torture". This section on protects the dignity of its citizens, even though attacks against a person race may be considered degrading, this law does not protect against it because the Tunisian government denies the existence of racism and therefore this law has no need to address it.

Article 47 states "The state must provide all types of protection to all children without discrimination and in accordance with their best interest." This also does not apply to racist remarks, according to the government. It only applies to the physical protection of children, not the verbal or racial discrimination they can face daily. None of these articles are interpreted to criminalize racism and discrimination. Several organizations were started shortly after the 2011 revolution with the goal of making the government re-interpret or add to these articles to apply to racism. Association for Equality and Development (ADAM) and Minorités, and M’nemty all held marches, events, seminars and protest trying to win the support of the public and Tunisian government officials. Initially, the movement began on social media because traditional media did not cover it. These protests were met with strong resistance from the population majority. Arab nationalists believed the protests were tearing the country apart and removing the focus from important issues such as Tunisia's failing economy. In addition, some didn't believe that racism in Tunisia existed and thought that the black population was looking for attention.

In January 2018, Prime Minister Youssef Chahed publicly supported the creation of a draft to criminalize racism by either adding to Articles 21, 25, and 47, or creating an entirely new law altogether. Several events prior to this announcement pushed the Prime Minister to support the cause. Civil rights activists credit a girl named Sabrina for starting the talk about the creation of the law. In early 2016, Sabrina was verbally abused with racial insults on the street and reported the incident to the police. However, because of the lack of laws prohibiting it, the police would not do anything about it. The event did little more than spark interest, but on Christmas Eve 2016, a racially motivated knife attack in a train station which left three black students wounded provided more reason for people to demand an anti-racism law from the government. The drafting of the law started shortly after. On October 9, 2018, Tunis' Parliament passed a new law called the "Elimination of All Forms of Racial Discrimination" Act. Under the new law, discrimination is described as "any distinction, exclusion, restriction or preference based on race, color, ancestry" or other discrimination that leads to "disturbances, an obstruction, or privation." Breaking the law can result in a fine of up to 1000 dollars and up to three years in prison. Messaoud Romdhani, head of the Tunisian Forum for Economic and Social Rights, compared the passing of the law equivalent in value to the abolition of slavery in improving the country and daily lives of its citizens.

== Women's rights ==
After taking power, the post-revolutionary government accepted in principle equality between women and men in elections. Human Rights Watch has noted that "Tunisia, long viewed as the most progressive Arab country with respect to women's rights, marked additional advances in this field" as a result of the revolution. For example, the Council of Ministers decided to withdraw Tunisia's reservations to the Convention on the Elimination of All Forms of Discrimination against Women, though the government suggested "it might not implement reforms that conflict with Islam."

Furthermore, Tunisia bans polygamy and the Islamic practice by which a man can divorce his wife with a simple declaration. Men and women have equal divorce rights and are required to undergo a judicial process to receive a divorce. The minimum age for marriage for both men and women is 18; since 1993, women have enjoyed the right to pass their names and nationalities to their children. As one observer has noted, in Tunis, unlike many cities in the Muslim world, "unmarried young men and women mingle openly together in coffee shops and restaurants. Most of the men are clean-shaven and dressed in modern European styles. The women are not veiled; many of them wear makeup and do not have headscarves." Still, discrimination persists under law and in daily life, with women still denied equal rights in inheritance and custody matters.

A bill to strengthen punishment for, and curtail violence against women is in the parliament and expected to pass. The proposed law, which would be incorporated into other legislation and government policies, would introduce sweeping definitions of gender-based violence, covering psychological and economic harm in both the public and domestic spheres. Marital rape would be outlawed and there would be an end to impunity for rapists if their victims are under 20 and they subsequently marry them. Penalties for sexual harassment at work would be increased and police officers and hospital staff trained in gender issues.

In 2017, Tunisia became the first Arab country to outlaw domestic violence against women, which was previously not a crime. Also the law stating that if a rapist marries his victim, he escapes punishment was also changed. According to Human Rights Watch, 47% of Tunisian women have been subject to violence in the home.

In September 2017, the Tunisian legislature repealed the country's law prohibiting marriages between Muslim women and Non-Muslim men. In most Muslim-majority countries, such marriages remain illegal.

== Children's rights ==
According to pre-revolutionary laws, Tunisian children inherited their citizenship from: a Tunisian father; a Tunisian mother and an unknown father; a Tunisian mother and a father who has no nationality; or birth in Tunisia to a Tunisian mother and a foreign father. Children were entitled to free education up to and including university. School attendance was mandatory up to age 16. Under the pre-revolutionary government there were severe penalties for assaulting minors, but prosecution of such offenses was extremely rare. Government-employed social workers assisted abused children, and the Ministry of Women's Affairs, Family, Children, and Elderly Persons "employed a child protection delegate in each of the country's 24 districts to intervene in cases of sexual, economic, or criminal exploitation of children." Presumably these rules and protections are still in place in post-revolutionary Tunisia.

== LGBT rights ==
One group that has not benefited noticeably from the Tunisian revolution is LGBTQIA+ people. "While the fall of Ben Ali has afforded a greater space to free expression, not all Tunisian homosexuals are convinced things are headed in the right direction," reported the Tunisia Live website in January 2012. "Homosexuals in Tunisia celebrated the ouster of dictator Ben Ali, hoping it would improve their situation," noted Deutsche Welle in November 2012, "But in nearly two years, little has changed for the country's gay and lesbian community." Under Article 230 of the penal code, anal intercourse can still be punished by up to three years in prison. In June 2012, Tunisia's Minister for Human Rights vehemently rejected a call by the United Nations Human Rights Committee to decriminalize same-sex acts, dismissing sexual orientation as a Western concept and insisting on its incompatibility with Islam. A large amount of anecdotal evidence suggests that harassment and assaults by police officers and others on LGBT persons continue to be widespread.

In August 2012, a gay Italian tourist identified as Angelo was murdered in the Tunisian resort town of Hammamet by a local who stabbed him 10 times. A friend claimed that he had cried for help but "his plea went unanswered because he was gay". She described a man who kept eating a bowl of soup "just a few feet from the man's murder" and she also maintained that "townspeople spoke as if Angelo deserved to die because of his homosexuality and children laughed at the tragedy." Commenting on the murder, a Tunisian editor for Gay Middle East said that "human rights in general and LGBTQIA+ rights in particular" are "getting worse in Tunisia ... Society hated gays before Ben Ali, but under [the new ruling party] Ennahda, homosexuality is used as political weapon even more rigorously than in Ben Ali’s time."

After the revolution, at least six associations for LGBTQ+ rights were opened in Tunisia, following the first widespread homophobic campaigns. The freedom of association and of expression gained post-2011 helped in making LGBTQ+ rights a national issue according to Abri Kréfa.

== Employee rights ==
Before the revolution, Tunisian law technically allowed workers to join unions, but this right was not always respected. All unions belonged to the UGTT, a federation that was technically independent but whose leaders were often subject to government harassment and to limitations on their freedom of action. Strikes were subject to UGTT approval, a requirement that the International Trade Union Conference called a violation of employee rights, but in practice unions rarely asked for such approval. Collective bargaining was permitted and protected. Forced labor was illegal, although some girls were compelled to work as domestic servants, and there were rules governing work by children, with those under 16 generally forbidden to work, although in practice many children "performed agricultural work in rural areas and worked as vendors in towns."

The UGTT played a major role in the revolution but "has become the main opposition force" against the new government. During the post-revolutionary period it "has been flexing its muscles," announcing a general strike that was called off after talks with government officials.

== Disabled persons ==
Pre-revolutionary Tunisian law banned, and presumably post-revolutionary law still prohibits, discrimination against disabled persons. The prewar law required that "at least one percent of public and private sector jobs be reserved for persons who have disabilities", but many employers were not even aware of this law. Prior to the revolution, the government had "increased vocational training programs in handicrafts geared toward persons who have disabilities," and a 1991 required new public buildings to be accessible to the disabled. Before the revolution, it was the job of the Ministry of Social Affairs, Solidarity, and Tunisians Abroad to protect disabled rights, and this is presumably still the case

== Asylum seekers and refugees ==
Many people fled to Tunisia in 2011, including Libyans fleeing the revolution in that country. Some were returned home but at the end of 2011 several thousand remained at a refugee camp on the Libyan border. Human Rights Watch described the situation as a "humanitarian crisis," noting that "Tunisia hosted at least 195,241 third-country nationals" as of mid 2011, and that "the military authorities—aided by Tunisian civil society, international organizations, and volunteers—made significant efforts to respond to the humanitarian needs."

== Right to a healthy environment ==
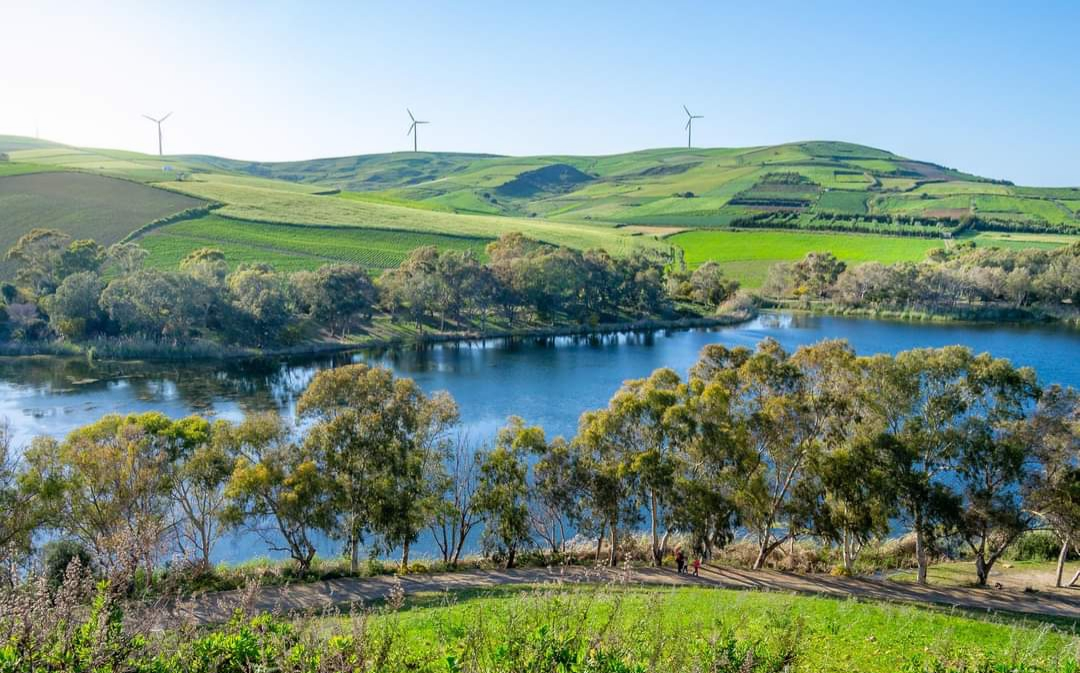
Wind farm in Tunisia

The "right to a healthy environment" in Tunisia is a human right guaranteed mainly by the Tunisian Constitution of 2014 but also by other laws and international conventions.

== Freedom in the World Report ==
The following is a chart of Tunisia's ratings since 1972 in the Freedom in the World reports, published annually by Freedom House. A rating of 1 is "free"; 7, "not free".

Historical ratings

Year	Political Rights	Civil Liberties	Status	President^{1}
1972	6	5	Not Free	Habib Bourguiba
1973	6	5	Not Free	Habib Bourguiba
1974	6	5	Not Free	Habib Bourguiba
1975	6	5	Not Free	Habib Bourguiba
1976	6	5	Not Free	Habib Bourguiba
1977	6	5	Not Free	Habib Bourguiba
1978	6	5	Not Free	Habib Bourguiba
1979	6	5	Not Free	Habib Bourguiba
1980	6	5	Not Free	Habib Bourguiba
1981	5	5	Partly Free	Habib Bourguiba
1982	5	5	Partly Free	Habib Bourguiba
1983	5	5	Partly Free	Habib Bourguiba
1984	5	5	Partly Free	Habib Bourguiba
1985	5	5	Partly Free	Habib Bourguiba
1986	6	5	Not Free	Habib Bourguiba
1987	6	5	Not Free	Habib Bourguiba
1988	6	4	Partly Free	Zine El Abidine Ben Ali
1989	5	3	Partly Free	Zine El Abidine Ben Ali
1990	5	4	Partly Free	Zine El Abidine Ben Ali
1991	5	5	Partly Free	Zine El Abidine Ben Ali
1992	6	5	Not Free	Zine El Abidine Ben Ali
1993	6	5	Not Free	Zine El Abidine Ben Ali
1994	6	5	Not Free	Zine El Abidine Ben Ali
1995	6	5	Not Free	Zine El Abidine Ben Ali
1996	6	5	Not Free	Zine El Abidine Ben Ali
1997	6	5	Not Free	Zine El Abidine Ben Ali
1998	6	5	Not Free	Zine El Abidine Ben Ali
1999	6	5	Not Free	Zine El Abidine Ben Ali
2000	6	5	Not Free	Zine El Abidine Ben Ali
2001	6	5	Not Free	Zine El Abidine Ben Ali
2002	6	5	Not Free	Zine El Abidine Ben Ali
2003	6	5	Not Free	Zine El Abidine Ben Ali
2004	6	5	Not Free	Zine El Abidine Ben Ali
2005	6	5	Not Free	Zine El Abidine Ben Ali
2006	6	5	Not Free	Zine El Abidine Ben Ali
2007	7	5	Not Free	Zine El Abidine Ben Ali
2008	7	5	Not Free	Zine El Abidine Ben Ali
2009	7	5	Not Free	Zine El Abidine Ben Ali
2010	7	5	Not Free	Zine El Abidine Ben Ali
2011	3	4	Partly Free	Moncef Marzouki
2012	3	4	Partly Free	Moncef Marzouki
2013	3	3	Partly Free	Moncef Marzouki
2014	1	3	Free	Beji Caid Essebsi
2015	1	3	Free	Beji Caid Essebsi
2016	1	3	Free	Beji Caid Essebsi
2017	2	3	Free	Beji Caid Essebsi
2018	2	3	Free	Beji Caid Essebsi
2019	2	3	Free	Kais Saied
2020	2	3	Free	Kais Saied
2021	3	3	Partly Free	Kais Saied
2022	4	3	Partly Free	Kais Saied

== See also ==
- Human trafficking in Tunisia
- 18 October Coalition for Rights and Freedoms
- Truth and Dignity Commission (Tunisia)

== Notes ==
1.As of January 1.
