= Mondher Zenaidi =

Tunisian politician

- منذر الزنايدي
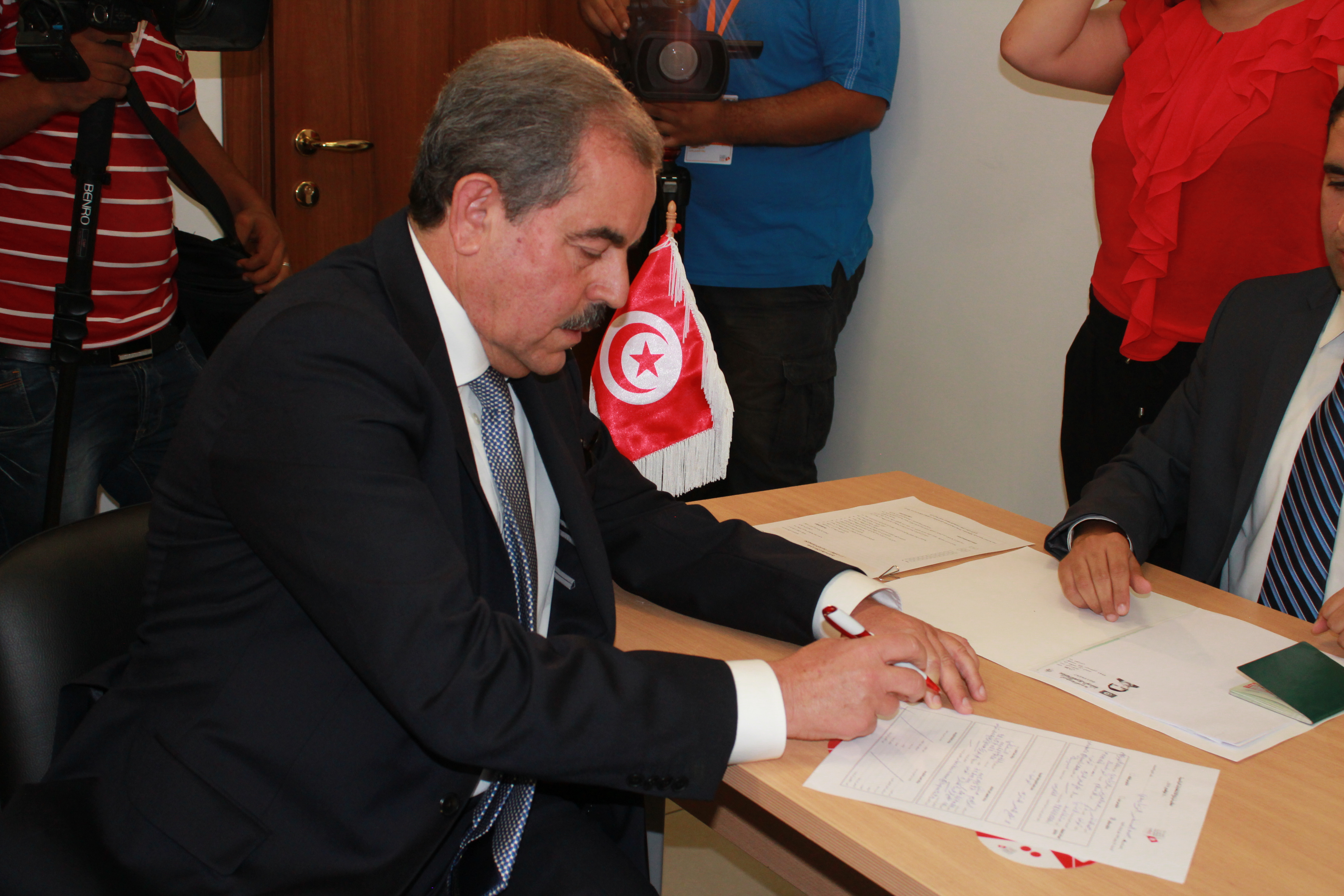
- Zenaidi in 2014

Minister of Public Health
- In office 3 September 2007 – 17 January 2011
- President: Zine el-Abidine Ben Ali
- Prime Minister: Mohamed Ghannouchi
- Preceded by: Mohamed Ridha Kechrid
- Succeeded by: Mustapha Ben Jaafar

Minister of Commerce
- In office 5 September 2002 – 3 September 2007
- President: Zine el-Abidine Ben Ali
- Prime Minister: Mohamed Ghannouchi
- Preceded by: Tahar Sioud
- Succeeded by: Ridha Touiti

Minister of Tourism
- In office 25 January 2001 – 22 March 2004
- President: Zine el-Abidine Ben Ali
- Prime Minister: Mohamed Ghannouchi

Minister of Commerce
- In office 13 June 1996 – 25 January 2001
- President: Zine el-Abidine Ben Ali
- Prime Minister: Hamed Karoui; Mohamed Ghannouchi
- Preceded by: Slaheddine Ben Mbarek
- Succeeded by: Tahar Sioud

Minister of Transport
- In office 1 June 1994 – 13 June 1996
- President: Zine el-Abidine Ben Ali
- Prime Minister: Hamed Karoui
- Preceded by: Tahar Hadj Ali
- Succeeded by: Sadok Rabah

Personal details
- Born: 24 October 1950 (age 75) Tunis, French protectorate of Tunisia
- Party: Independent
- Other political affiliations: Democratic Constitutional Rally (until 2011)
- Children: 2
- Education: École Centrale Paris, ENA

Mondher Zenaidi (Arabic: منذر الزنايدي; born 24 October 1950) is a Tunisian politician. He served in the government of Tunisia as Minister of Public Health from 2007 to 2011. Prior to this, he was Secretary of State for Trade and Industry, Minister of Transport, and Minister of Commerce.

== Education ==
Zenaidi was born on October 24, 1950, in Tunis. He graduated from the École centrale Paris in 1973 and the École nationale d'administration in 1976.

== Political career ==
He served as chief of cabinet of the Ministry of Health, general director of the Tunisian National Office for Tourism, and general director of the Tunisian Office of Commerce. In 1991, he was elected vice-president of the Tunisian Parliament. He was appointed as Secretary of State for Trade and Industry, then as Minister of Transport in 1994, Minister of Commerce in 1996, Minister of Commerce and Tourism in 2002, Minister of Commerce and Handicraft. In 2007, he was appointed as Minister of Public Health.

He was a board member of the Constitutional Democratic Rally. He was elected as sixty-third president of the World Health Assembly. He has been involved with the World Trade Organization and the Organisation of the Islamic Conference.

Zenaidi applied to run in the 2024 Tunisian presidential election but was disqualified by the High Independent Authority for Elections despite winning an appeal in the Administrative Court.
