= Abdellatif Mekki =

Tunisian politician

- عبد اللطيف المكي
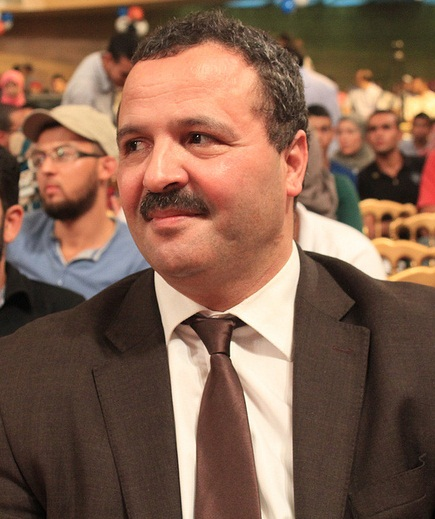
- Born: 1962 (age 63–64); El Ksour, Tunisia
- Political party: Ennahda Movement

Abdellatif Mekki (Arabic: عبد اللطيف المكي; born 1962) is a Tunisian politician who served as the Minister of Public Health under Prime Minister Elyes Fakhfakh.

== Early life ==
Abdellatif Mekki was born in 1962 in El Ksour. He holds a degree in biochemistry. While at university, he served as Secretary General of the student union Union Générale des Etudiants de Tunisie (UGET).

== Politics ==
He was head of the Ennahda Movement. As a result, he was jailed from 1991 to 2001. On 20 December 2011, he joined the Jebali Cabinet as Minister of Public Health. He was also a member of the Constituent Assembly of Tunisia. On August 5, 2024, a court sentenced Mekki to eight months in prison and banned him from running for election for vote buying. On August 27, the Administrative Court of Tunis accepted Abdellatif Mekki's appeal, allowing him to run for president in the 2024 Tunisian presidential election.
