= Ayachi Zammel =

Tunisian politician (born 1977)

- العياشي زمال

President of Azimoun
- In office 27 June 2022 – 24 August 2024
- Preceded by: Party established

Member of the Assembly of the Representatives of the People for Siliana
- In office 13 November 2019 – 13 December 2021

Personal details
- Born: 16 September 1977 (age 48) Mansoura, Tunisia
- Party: Tahya Tounes; Azimoun

Ayachi Zammel (Arabic: العياشي زمال; born 16 August 1977) is a Tunisian politician. A graduate of the Faculty of Sciences of Tunis, he is a chemical engineer by training, then became general manager of Ayachi Group. Ayachi Zammel is married and the father of two children.

== Biography ==
During the 2019 Tunisian parliamentary election, he was elected deputy of the Tahya Tounes party and indicated that he would give up his parliamentary immunity upon his election. He left his party in 2020 to join the National Bloc. During his term, he was a member of the committees for regional development, agriculture, food security and trade, as well as the affairs of Tunisians abroad; he also held the presidency of the committee for health and social affairs during the COVID-19 pandemic and until the dissolution of parliament. He then founded the Azimoun party on 27 June 2022, and chaired it until 24 August 2024, when he presented his candidacy for the presidential election.

Once a candidate, Ayachi Zammel was arrested on 2 September 2024 and placed in pretrial detention two days later on charges of false sponsorship. After obtaining his provisional release on 5 September, he was immediately arrested and sentenced to twenty months in prison on 18 September. On 25 September, a new six-month prison sentence for “falsifying documents” was handed down against him. On 1 October, he was sentenced to an additional twelve years in prison, a decision, as well as the rejection and imprisonment of other candidates, which were denounced by Human Rights Watch. On 11 October, Ayachi Zammel was sentenced to 11 years in prison in four cases related to rigging election sponsorships. On 22 October he was sentenced to an additional five years in prison.

This accumulation of summary convictions is interpreted as a judicial relentlessness reflecting the power's panic in the face of his electoral potential, with many opponents considering voting for him, despite his lack of notoriety, the latter having initially spared him from a rejection of his candidacy.
