= Gaza protests =

Gaza protests may refer to:

- 2011–2012 Palestinian protests
- 2018–2019 Gaza border protests
- 2019 Gaza economic protests
- 2023 Gaza economic protests
- Gaza war protests
  - 2025 Gaza Strip anti-Hamas protests
