= June 26 Revolution =

2026 protests against Hamas

- Part of the Gaza War and Gaza War protests in the Gaza Strip
- Date: 26 June 2026
- Location: Gaza City, Khan Younis
- Caused by: War-weariness from the Gaza war and Gaza genocide
- Goals: Protest against Hamas
- Methods: Mass protests
- Result: Protests suppressed by force

Parties
- Anti-war and anti-Hamas protesters
  - June 26 Revolution movement
  - We Want to Live movement
  - Fatah members
- Hamas government
  - Gazan Police
- Hamas
  - Al-Qassam Brigades
Supported by:
- Israel

Number
Hundreds/dozens of protesters	Unknown

Casualties and losses
Unknown number detained	None

The June 26 Revolution was an anti-Hamas movement and campaign in the Gaza Strip that called for mass protests against Hamas starting on June 26, 2026. The movement was organized by Palestinians opposed to Hamas and was promoted through social media and personal networks.

On the day of the planned demonstrations, Hamas suppressed the protests with mass arrests, intimidation and death threats. The protests, which were scheduled to take place at 18 locations across the Gaza Strip, were attended by dozens of people and were officially endorsed by the government of Israel.

The reaction of Gaza residents to the protests was mixed; some supported the movement, while others called on people not to participate in the protests to avoid further unrest or due to Israel's support of the protests. The campaign was the largest anti-Hamas protest in the Gaza Strip since 2025.

== Timeline ==
=== Prelude ===
On 13 June 2026, a new movement calling itself the "June 26 Revolution" organized by a group of Gazan activists and journalists in exile started gaining popularity in the Gaza Strip. The movement called for residents of the Gaza Strip to protest against Hamas and living conditions in Gaza on 26 June. It was created by Palestinian journalist Abdul Hamid Abdul Ati, who fled to Egypt with his family at the start of the Gaza war. In a post on X, Ati said that his movement was created for "the public interest and to save what can be saved from a reality that weighs heavily on the people of Gaza". In an interview with The Jerusalem Post, he said that his goal is to "give hope to Gazans" and "show them a path to dignity and a normal life", he added that the movement is against the continuation of the Gaza war. Some activists of the movement said they were affiliated with Fatah.

Anti-Hamas activists from the Gaza Strip supported Ati's calls for protests and urged Gazans to take part in planned demonstrations. This caused a range of reactions among Gazans, some positive and some negative. Hamas and Hamas-affiliated media started accusing the movement's organizers of promoting foreign interests. They also stated that they had no right to speak on behalf of Gazans while living abroad. Abdul Hamid Abdul Ati received death threats from Hamas supporters, causing him to briefly disassociate himself from the campaign. Hamas accused Ati and movement activists of being "traitors and collaborators of Israel" who promoted anarchy.

The movement operated a Facebook page, which it used to make announcements. Dozens of people commented positively on the movement's Facebook page. The campaign was promoted through social media and personal networks and was organized under the slogan "We want to live", which was first used during 2017 protests in the Gaza Strip against economic hardships. Reportedly, members of the We Want to Live movement, a grassroots youth movement opposed to Hamas, were involved in organizing the June 26 protests.

=== Crackdown by Hamas ===
On June 26, 2026, the protests began as planned. Videos appeared on social media showing hundreds of Palestinians protesting against Hamas in the streets, some carrying signs reading, "God willing, Hamas out" and "We want to live". The June 26 Revolution movement called for people to protest at 18 locations across the Gaza Strip on Facebook. Protests reportedly took place in Gaza City and Khan Yunis and lasted for an hour. According to a Gaza resident, Hamas members were seen being deployed in Deir al-Balah to prevent gatherings.

Hamas had reportedly monitored the movement from its inception and planned to suppress the protests once they began, threatening organizers of the movement with violence against their relatives if they continued to participate in the campaign. According to multiple Gaza residents, Hamas asked journalists not to cover the protests. Major media outlets in the Gaza Strip declared the movement a "failure" and showed empty sites where the movement had called for protests. Hamas carried out multiple arrests and beatings of suspected protesters. Gazan humanitarian activist Ahmed Fouad Alkhatib told The Daily Telegraph that his friends were summoned by Hamas secret police to Al-Ahli Arab Hospital where they were threatened with summary execution under "revolutionary conditions" if they expressed support for or participated in the protests. He claimed that some of his friends were imprisoned in the hospital afterwards.

Hamas reportedly arrested some protesters and sent them to four hospitals for detention: Al-Aqsa Martyrs Hospital, Nasser Hospital, Al-Ahli Arab Hospital and Al-Shifa Hospital. Editor-in-chief of Jusoor News Hadeel Oueiss told Algemeiner Journal that various anti-Hamas activists were intimidated by Hamas and placed on house arrests during protests. Algemeiner Journal said that Hamas had successfully crushed the protests.

== Reactions ==
The Israeli government's Arabic account on X supported the protests, calling on people to "revolt against the oppressors". Israeli agriculture minister Avi Dichter also posted a video in Arabic calling on Gaza residents to support the protests.

The Palestinian Scholars Association, an organization linked to Hamas, issued fatwas calling the protesters "agents of the occupation". It warned that Israel's collaborators would be executed by Hamas. Jamil Abdul-Nabi, leader of the Palestinian Islamic Jihad in northern Gaza, said that people of Gaza have "right to express their anger" and that accusations of the protesters committing treason is oppression by a dictatorship.

A coalition of tribes in the Gaza Strip called the protests "misleading campaigns aimed at sowing discord" and called on the population not to take part in them. Reactions of Gaza residents to the protests were mixed; some supported the movement, seeing it as a response to oppression by Hamas and Israel, while others called on people not to participate in the protests to avoid further conflict and unrest. Some rejected the protests due to them being supported by Israel. Hamas politician Khaled Mashal told Echorouk El Yawmi that Hamas was ordered not to infringe on freedom of expression of Palestinians but noted that the protests should have been directed against the "crimes of the occupation" instead of the government.

Gazan humanitarian activist Ahmed Fouad Alkhatib claimed that the campaign was largely ignored by mainstream media and pro-Palestine activists because it did not involve Israel. Co-founder of We Want to Live movement Mohammed Altooll said that the protests failed not because of Israel's influence or fear of Hamas but due to lack of leadership and political vision. Al-Quds called the movement a "widespread digital disinformation operation" carried out by external forces that lacked popular support.
