= 2019 Gaza economic protests =

Protests in Gaza as a part of 2018-2022 Arab protests

2019 We Want to Live Gaza protests
- Part of Second Arab Spring
- Map of the Gaza Strip
- Date: 14 March 2019 – 18 March 2019 (4 days)
- Location: Gaza Strip
- Caused by: Economic instability and government corruption in the Gaza Strip
- Goals: Reducing cost of living; Reducing taxation
- Methods: Demonstration
- Result: Hamas crackdown on protesters

Parties
(Palestine) Gaza protesters; Fatah	Hamas; (Palestine) Hamas government in Gaza; Al-Qassam Brigades

Lead figures
(Palestine) Moumen Al-Natour	Ismail Haniyeh; Yahya Sinwar; Mohammed Deif; Fathi Hamad

Casualties
- Arrested: 1,000+

The 2019 Gaza economic protests, also called the We Want to Live protests and the 14 March Movement, were a series of protests held in the Gaza Strip from 14 March to 18 March; demonstrators protested high costs of living and tax hikes. Moumen Al-Natour, a Palestinian lawyer and human rights activist, founded the We Want to Live movement.

The protests were met with violence by the Hamas which dispatched security forces to disperse protesters. Several human rights organizations and political factions have denounced attacks on protesters by Hamas security forces. The protests were described as the most severe anti-regime protests in Gaza since the Hamas takeover in 2007.

== Background ==
A year after winning the 2006 Palestinian legislative election, Hamas took full control of the Gaza Strip in 2007 and expelled the Palestinian Authority; meanwhile, the Palestinian Authority attempted to put financial pressure on Hamas.

After Hamas took over, Israel and Egypt tightened its blockade on the region, further restricting movement of products and people; BBC reported in 2019 that the blockade became a source of economic woe. In 2019, youth unemployment in the Gaza Strip was at 70% according to the World Bank. At the time, Hamas raised taxes in the region, including on items like cigarettes, as well as food staples like tomatoes.

== Events ==
In February, the call and hashtag "We Want to Live" started gaining traction online, specifically among several unaffiliated media activists. Moumen Al-Natour then began using a Facebook page called "We Want to Live" to disseminate information and organize.

In-person demonstrations began on 14 March 2019 in multiple locations across Gaza. Protesters carried signs with statements such as: "We want to live the same life of luxury, money and cars as Hamas' leaders' sons."

The demonstrations were met with force by Hamas security; beatings and mass arrests were reported by The National. Fatah accused Hamas of threatening the families of participants and breaking into their houses. Hamas forces also arrested students at al-Azhar University.

Amnesty International released a report on 18 March stating that hundreds of protesters were beat, arbitrarily arrested, detained, tortured, and subjected to "other forms of ill-treatment." Amnesty additionally reported that in the afternoon of 14 March, peaceful protesters in the Jabalya refugee camp, Deir al-Balah camp, Al-Bureij camp, and Rafah were assaulted by Hamas security forces (some who were dressed as civilians) with pepper spray, batons, sound grenades, ammunition, and physical attacks.

The We Want to Live Facebook page called for a general strike on 20–21 March. On 21 March, a local human rights watchdog reported that over 1,000 people had been arrested in connection with the protests, some of whom had been arrested in the middle of the night at their homes. It was also reported that family members of protesters, including children, were beaten and arrested.

The Journalists Syndicate reported that Hamas security forces had beaten journalists and confiscated their cellphones and equipment. Around 45 journalists in total were arrested. Arrestees included director of the Palestinian Broadcasting Corporation Rafat al-Qudra and Independent Commission for Human Rights director Jamil Sarhan; the latter was hospitalized. Protesters who had been released additionally reported being beaten and tortured during detainment.

== Responses ==
Hamas' use of force against the demonstrators was condemned by the Palestinian National Authority, as well as UN Mideast Envoy Nickolay Mladenov.

== See also ==
- 2025 Gaza Strip anti-Hamas protests and Arab Spring
- 2023 Gaza economic protests
- 2011–2012 Palestinian protests
- 2018–2019 Gaza border protests
