= We Want to Live movement =

Youth movement in the Gaza Strip

The We Want to Live movement (Arabic: بدنا نعيش, romanized: Bidna Na'eesh) is a grassroots youth movement in the Gaza Strip calling for increased economic opportunity and the removal of Hamas from power. The movement was founded in March 2019, giving rise to the 2019 Gaza economic protests. It is not connected to any one political party, and some sources have connected the movement to the Arab Spring of the early 2010s.

== Goals ==
The movement is responding to multiple issues, broadly defined as economic disenfranchisement, such as unemployment rates and increased taxes. Other issues of concern include the competency of leadership, electricity shortages, access to drinking water, food insecurity, access to education, and freedom of speech.

== History ==
The movement began in March 2019, as part of the 2019 Gaza economic protests. The group's Facebook page quickly gained several thousand followers. Initially, the movement was critical of Hamas, but did not call for its ousting, fearing that it would be an impossible demand. Instead, they focused on material changes such as reduced taxation and lower prices of necessities, as well as a Fatah–Hamas reconciliation and new elections. Multiple organizers of the movement, including Palestinian lawyer Moumen Al-Natour, were arrested and detained, charged with "collaborating with hostile foreign entities, in violation of domestic law". Several were referred to military courts. After lobbying and popular and international advocacy campaigns, Al-Natour was released.

In 2020, one of the group's leaders, Suleiman al-Ajouri, committed suicide. The movement's Facebook page posted about the event, connecting al-Ajouri's suicide directly to the economic disenfranchisement of Gaza's youth. Four of al-Ajouri's friends were arrested following his funeral, due to their connections to the movement; several journalists reporting on his death were also arrested.

In November 2021, the group again gained traction online following the drowning of three Gazan migrants attempting to reach Greece, and reports of Hamas leadership leading lavish lifestyles. This continued in July 2022, with protesters sharing videos online of Gazans living in poverty and residents in physical confrontations with Hamas security forces.

In late July and early August 2023, the movement again led in-person protests in response to the accidental killing of a man by authorities in Khan Yunis. Hamas responded to the protests with increased security, and arrested several demonstrators and journalists covering the demonstrations.

== Response ==
Over a thousand Gazans were detained by Hamas. Hamas has attempted to downplay the movement by claiming that its leadership are Israeli or part of the Palestinian Authority. When addressing physical demonstrations, Hamas has used arrests and excessive force. Participants who have been arrested have been subject to torture. One protester reporting losing his eyesight following repeated interrogations.

Hamas has also intimidated journalists and confiscated their equipment to deter reporting on the movement or its protests.

The movement has received support from the Palestine Liberation Organization.
