= Mohammed Yousef El-Najar Hospital =

Hospital in Rafah, Gaza, Palestine

Mohammed Yousef El-Najar Hospital مستشفى الشهيد أبو يوسف النجار

Geography
- Location: Rafah, Gaza, Palestine
- Coordinates: 31°17′49.1″N 34°14′37.5″E

Organisation
- Care system: Public
- Type: District General

Services
- Beds: 65

History
- Opened: 2000
- Closed: 2024 (as part of the Gaza war)

The Mohammed Yousef El-Najar Hospital (Arabic: مستشفى الشهيد أبو يوسف النجار) is a hospital in Rafah, Gaza Strip, Palestine. In May 2024, during the Gaza war, the hospital relocated to a makeshift facility prior to the Rafah offensive.

== History ==
The hospital was established in 2000 by transforming the previous center for primary care at the building. The hospital spans an area of 4,000 m^{2}. It has 65 beds and two operating rooms. The emergency department has 9 beds.

On 1 August 2014, the building was attacked by Israel Defense Forces.

During the 2023 Gaza economic protests, Hamas authorities launched an arrest campaign after the outbreak of protests, including raiding the hospital to arrest injured protesters seeking treatment at the hospital.

== See also ==
- List of hospitals in Palestine
