= Moumen al-Natour =

Palestinian lawyer and rights activist (born 1995)

- مؤمن الناطور
- Born: Moumen Al-Natour; 12 December 1995 (age 30)
- Occupation: Lawyer
- Years active: 2019–present

Moumen Al-Natour (Arabic: مؤمن الناطور, romanized: muʾmin alnnāṭūr; born 12 December 1995) is a Palestinian politician, lawyer and human rights defender. He is an organizer of the We Want to Live movement, a movement based in the Gaza Strip which has opposed the region's Hamas-controlled government.

== Activism ==
In March 2019, Moumen Al-Natour was an organizer of the 2019 Gaza economic protests, which protested Hamas and the economic conditions of the Gaza Strip. The protests were the largest since 2007, when Hamas took control of the region. During the protests, Hamas broke into Al-Natour's home, confiscated his family's cell phones, and threatened them with arrest unless Al-Natour gave himself up. He was subsequently arrested and charged with collaborating with Israel and the Palestinian Authority. He was arrested again in May and in August 2019.

Since 2019, Al-Natour has been an organizer of the We Want to Live movement, which grew in part from the 2019 protests. He has been involved with protests calling for elections and opportunities for youth in the Gaza Strip.

Al-Natour has been arrested and imprisoned by Hamas twenty times, for his criticism of the group and his attempts to organize protests. Al-Natour reported being tortured while imprisoned.

Al-Natour has also represented journalists who have been arrested for their criticism of Hamas. Although he is often unable to help those arrested in court, he amplifies their stories on social media, where mass pressure has sometimes led to their releases. Al-Natour has also represented women trying to get out of forced and abusive marriages.

During the Gaza war, Al-Natour founded Palestinian Youth for Development, which works to collect and distribute aid to Palestinians in need. He has expressed doubt that the war would be able to destroy Hamas completely. He supports a postwar leadership model that would center Palestinians from the region who are critical of Hamas, rather than outside aid groups.

In an October 2025 piece in The Wall Street Journal, al-Natour wrote that in July 2025, Hamas representatives told al-Natour to report to an interrogation at Al-Shifa hospital.

== Personal life ==
Al-Natour and his family lived in Al-Shati refugee camp, in central Gaza, but were displaced to southern Gaza in late 2023 due to the Gaza war. By July 2025, al-Natour had returned to Gaza City. In August 2025, al-Natour reported living "as a fugitive", moving frequently to avoid confrontations with Hamas.

While in Rafah, al-Natour came into contact with an Italian lawyer, who helped arrange transit to Italy. In October 2025, al-Natour's mother, six siblings, and one of his nephews, evacuated through the Kerem Shalom border crossing and moved to northern Italy. At the time, al-Natour was being held by Abu Shabab, but was later able to join his family in Italy. In a June 2026 interview, he said that he hoped to bring his wife and brother-in-laws to Italy as well.
