= 2011–2012 Palestinian protests =

Events during Arab Spring

2011-2012 Palestinian protests
- Part of Arab Spring
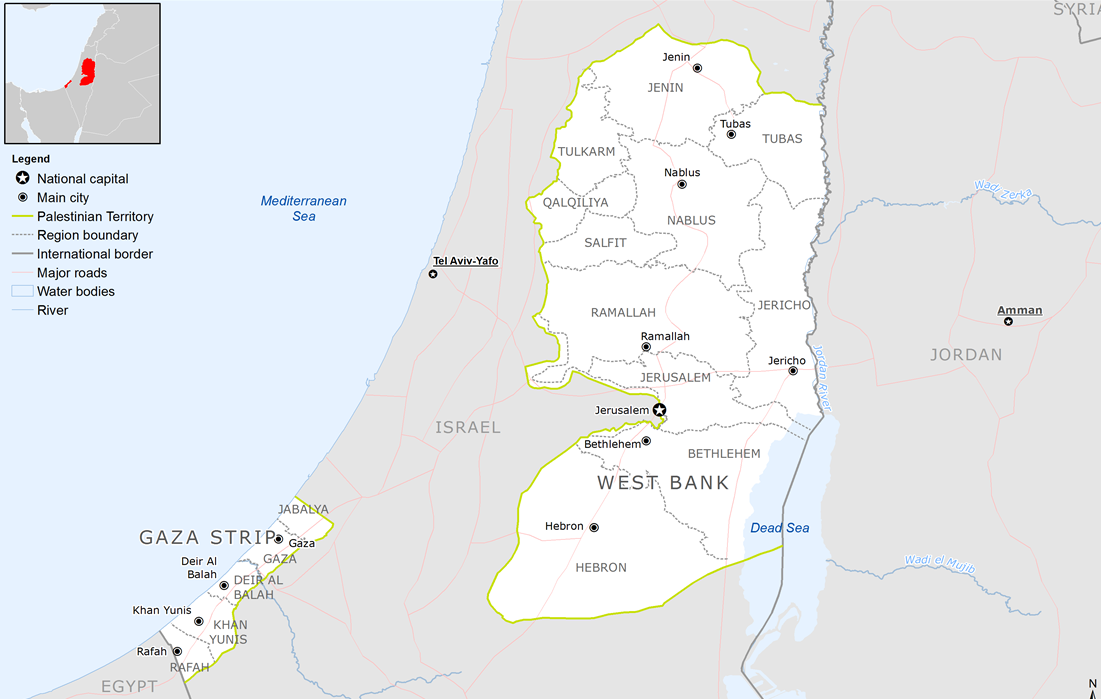
- Map of Palestinian territories
- Date: 3 February 2011 - 2 October 2012 (1 year, 7 months, 4 weeks and 1 day)
- Location: Palestine (West Bank and Gaza)
- Caused by: Inspired by the Tunisian Revolution; Unemployment and corruption
- Goals: Resignation of President Mahmoud Abbas; Fresh general elections
- Methods: Demonstrations, Riots
- Result: Protests suppressed by force

The 2011–2012 Palestinian protests were a series of protests in the Palestinian National Authority and the Hamas-ruled Gaza Strip, staged by various Palestinian groups as part of the wider Arab Spring. The protests were aimed to protest against the Palestinian government, as well as supporting the popular uprisings in Tunisia, Egypt and Syria. The first phase of protests took place during 2011 and the second phase in 2012.

Some suggested the 2012 protests were also inspired by the Arab Spring. Demonstrators were protesting against the economic policies of the Palestinian National Authority (PNA), and the increasing cost of living. On 1 September 2012, the PNA raised the price of fuel, as well as the value added tax rate. Mass demonstrations have taken place throughout the Palestinian Authority territory, including in Ramallah, Nablus, Balata Camp, Bir Zeit, Jalazun Camp, Hebron, Bethlehem, Beit Jala, Dheisheh Camp, Jenin, Jericho, Tulkarm and Dura. 2012 Protests have been characterized by road closures, tire burning, self-immolations, peaceful demonstrations, stone throwing clashes and workers' strikes.

== First phase ==
=== Goals ===
The goal of the early protests were to unify the two ruling parties, Fatah and Hamas. Other reasons included unemployment, inflation, and lack of economic growth.

=== February 2011 ===
The Palestinian Authority prevented several demonstrations in support of protesters in Tunisia and Egypt. On 3 February, Palestinian police dispersed an anti-Mubarak demonstration in downtown Ramallah, detaining four people, confiscating a cameraman's footage, and reportedly beating protesters. A smaller pro-Mubarak demonstration was permitted to take place in the same area and was guarded by police.

=== October 2011 ===
On 15 October, an anti-Assad protest expressing solidarity with Palestinian refugees in Syria affected by the unrest there took place in the Gaza Strip, and was attended by 150 people. Hamas police forces dispersed the demonstration, claiming that it was held without a permit.

=== Outcome ===
On 1 February 2012 the Palestinian Authority announced that it would hold municipal elections in July. Some sources speculated that this announcement was a reaction to the anti-government protests in Egypt. The elections were however postponed to 22 October 2012, then suspended indefinitely due to an internal division within the Palestinian Authority over candidates for many of the municipalities and councils, and fears that Hamas supporters would back Palestinian Authority opponents.

== Second phase ==
=== Causes ===
A rise in fuel prices, lowered quality of living and the current financial crisis and unpaid monthly salary payments for about 150,000 Palestinian workers have sparked the protests. The PNA is currently going through a financial crisis. In addition, the PNA has warned of potential cuts in electricity for large areas in the West Banks, prompting a rise in social tensions. Much of the demonstrators' anger has been directed towards the government of Prime Minister Salam Fayyad. The 1994 Protocol on Economic Relations has also been targeted, an interim agreement that is part of the Oslo accords whereby Israel controls Palestinian trade and collects taxes on behalf of the PNA. Further sources which point out the centrality to the Paris Protocol have also made the claim that these have been the first protests on the Palestinian West Bank not to be purely "political".

Because of Israeli restrictions on the Palestinian economy, the PNA relies on foreign aid. Due to delays in the funding by the United States and various Arab countries, the accumulating budget deficit has become a financial crisis for the PNA. Professor and former PNA spokesman Ghassan Khatib further states that the expansion of Israeli settlements and the subsequent confiscation of cultivable land and other natural resources has increased the PNA's dependence on foreign funds as well as the "exhaustion" of other venues such as taking bank loans and borrowing from the private sector.

=== Timeline ===
==== September 2012 ====
4 September - Mass protests involving thousands of Palestinians were held in cities throughout the West Bank in protest of price rises, higher costs of living, Salam Fayyad's handling of the financial crisis and the Paris Protocol. Several demonstrating groups also stressed they were protesting against the Israeli occupation in addition to dire conditions. In Hebron dozens of public transport vehicles drove from the northern to southern ends of the city protesting the cost of fuel, while hundreds of people participated in protests held in the city center. An effigy of Prime Minister Fayyad was set alight.

Smaller demonstrations occurred in Ramallah, Bethlehem and Jenin. In the city of al-Dura in the southern West Bank, 42-year-old Khaled Abu Rabee poured gasoline over himself and entered the municipal hall in an apparent self-immolation attempt. He was stopped by a security guard.

5 September - In Ramallah a man from Gaza unsuccessfully attempted to set himself and his 6-year-old daughter who has cancer alight in protest of his inability to pay for her cancer treatment and the costly price of living. He was stopped by police who arrested him. Meanwhile, school children protested the prices of basic goods in Beit Jala.

In response to growing protests in the West Bank, Palestinian President Mahmoud Abbas announced that the "Palestinian Spring," drawing relation to the regional Arab Spring, had begun. He further quoted a Palestinian proverb that "hunger is disloyal," acknowledging that people think of feeding their families as the top priority.

6 September - Demonstrations continued in West Bank cities. In Bethlehem, Beit Jala and Beit Sahour mostly young protesters forced many streets to close for traffic. Hundreds gathered to demonstrate in Nativity Street. In Jenin protesters demanded the resignation of Salam Fayyad, while in Tulkarm demonstrators marched with donkeys in a gesture to the rising price of conventional transport. Taxi drivers began a mass strike to protest rising fuel prices. Fayyad announced on Voice of Palestine radio that he was "ready to resign" but the replacement of government officials would not alleviate the PNA's financial crisis.

7 September - Palestinian National Initiative declared its support for protests against rising costs of living in the West Bank, and called for a "radical change" in economic policy.

8 September - Dozens of protesters closed down several streets in Tulkarm and Ramallah on Saturday, as protests against rising living costs continue across the West Bank. A main road in Tulkarm was blocked with rocks and burning tires and protesters in Ramallah closed off several streets in the city center. President Mahmoud Abbas reiterated that Israel and some Arab countries share the blame for the PA's financial crisis. He said the Palestinian Authority will not seek to stop the popular protests as long as they remain peaceful and do not harm public interests. However, he stressed that the government would not allow any attacks on public property.

9 September - Demonstrators in Ramallah called on President Mahmoud Abbas to resign on Sunday, as protests over the rising cost of living continue in the West Bank. Truck drivers blocked traffic in Ramallah's Manara Square as people marched in the city center against the economic policies of the Palestinian Authority. A leader in the popular protests, Mahir Amir, told Ma'an News Agency that protesters wanted to send a message to President Abbas to urge him to annul the Paris Protocol with Israel. The protests also demand that the PLO plays an appropriate role in controlling the Palestinian Authority.

10 September - Taxi drivers, teachers shopkeepers and other Palestinian workers joined a general strike. The head of the West Bank's Union of Public Transport, Nasser Younis, stated that over 24,000 drivers were participating, while the taxi union director in Jenin reported that 700 cars and 120 buses had joined. Activity in cities, towns and refugee camps have been largely frozen as a result of the public transportation strike.

In Hebron police clashed with protesters who targeted the city's municipal offices and fire trucks. Afterwards, several thousand demonstrators threw stones at a police station in the city. Police responded with tear gas to disperse the protests. According to Ma'an News Agency, dozens of protesters and police were injured. The governor of the Hebron Governorate Kamal Hmeid accused a "lawless minority" for the clashes.

Clashes also occurred in Bethlehem at the Bab al-Zaqaq crossroads after taxi drivers blocked the entry of traffic. Further confrontations broke out near Karkafeh Street when several people hurled stones at trucks blocking the street as part of the protests. In the city's Dheisheh refugee camp, demonstrators marched toward's President Abbas's local presidential headquarters chanting slogans condemning him, Prime Minister Fayyad, and the Paris Protocol. In order to prevent clashes, protest organizers formed a human chain to separate themselves from the security forces. Protests demanding the resignation of Fayyad erupted in nearby Beit Jala. Organizers urged participants to refrain from damaging public property.

In Ramallah demonstrators burned tires and garbage bins as they blocked off several of the city's main roads. Taxi drivers joined the protesters who chanted "leave, leave" (irhal, irhal), a common slogan heard in throughout the Arab Spring. Protests were also held in the nearby localities of Bir Zeit and Jalazun Camp.

Roads were blocked in the northern city of Jenin, hindering commerce in the city. In a separate incident, a number of Palestinian policemen were injured when protesters hurled stones and glass bottles at a police station in Nablus. Traffic was also blocked in some of the city's streets. Palestinian officials reported that demonstrators numbered 100-200 people. At the adjacent Balata Camp where protesters blocked the camp's main road. Further protests were reported in Tulkarm and Jericho.

PNA spokeswoman Nour Odeh stated the authorities would protect the rights of protesters and ensure their safety, although she added that the government would hold violators of the law responsible.

11 September - College and high school students have planned to join the general strike.

26 September - About 500 Palestinians protested in the Bureij refugee camp in the Gaza Strip, where demonstrations against the Hamas government are rare. They began following the death of a boy resident as a result of a fire during a power outage, a frequent occurrence in the Gaza Strip due to the short supply of fuel. Protesters called for the downfall of the Hamas administration, which they accused of being incompetent, and also laid blame at the rival government in the West Bank headed by Fayyad and Abbas. Hamas spokesman Taher al-Nono blamed Egypt for the fuel crisis and the international community for allowing the continuation of the blockade of the Gaza Strip.

==== October 2015 ====
2 October - Around 200 people demonstrated in the West Bank city of Ramallah to demand the resignation of Palestinian president Mahmoud Abbas. Waving flags and shouting "Abu Mazen (Abbas) leave," they marched from the central Al-Manara Square towards the presidential headquarters. They were blocked by police and there were some scuffles before the marchers dispersed. The march had been called to denounce the arrest in the West Bank, controlled by Abbas's Fatah party, of partisans of the Islamist movement Hamas, and arrests in the Hamas-controlled Gaza Strip of Fatah sympathisers.

=== Outcome ===
On 14 February 2013, amid pan-Arab calls for reform, Palestinian Authority Prime Minister Salam Fayyad submitted his resignation along with that of his cabinet to President Mahmoud Abbas. After consultations with other factions, institutions, and civil society groups, Abbas asked him to form a new government. The reshuffle had long been demanded by Fayyad as well as members of Abbas's Fatah faction.

== See also ==
- 2019 Gaza economic protests
- 2018–2019 Gaza border protests
- 2023 Gaza economic protests
- 2025 Gaza Strip anti-Hamas protests
