= Arab Spring =

2010s protests and revolutions in the Arab world

- Part of the modern Middle Eastern conflicts, and the Post–Cold War era
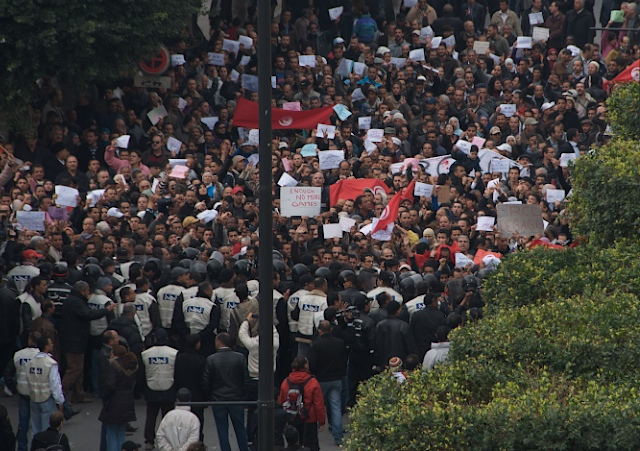
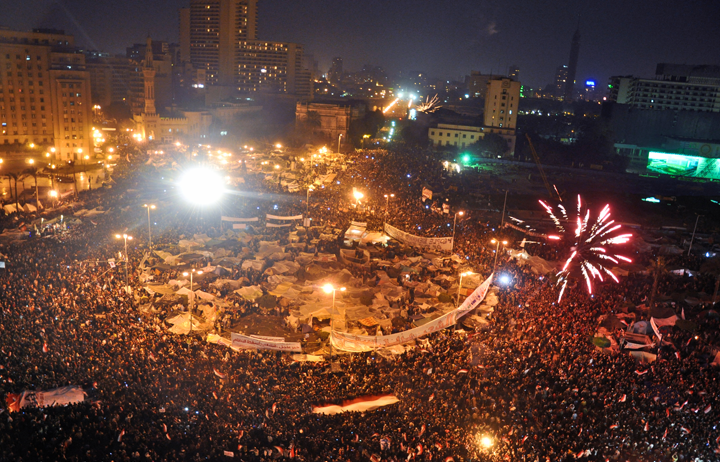
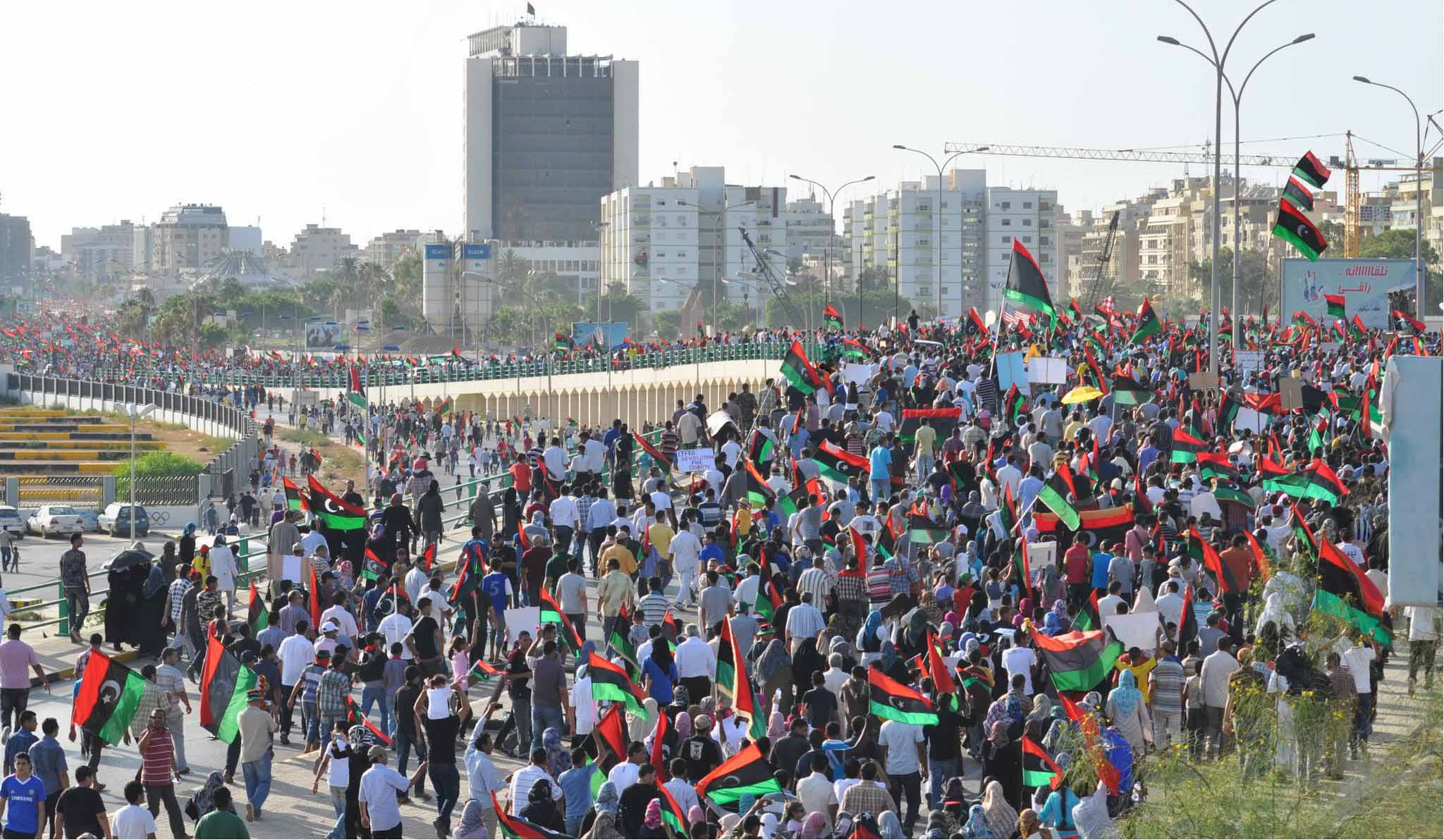
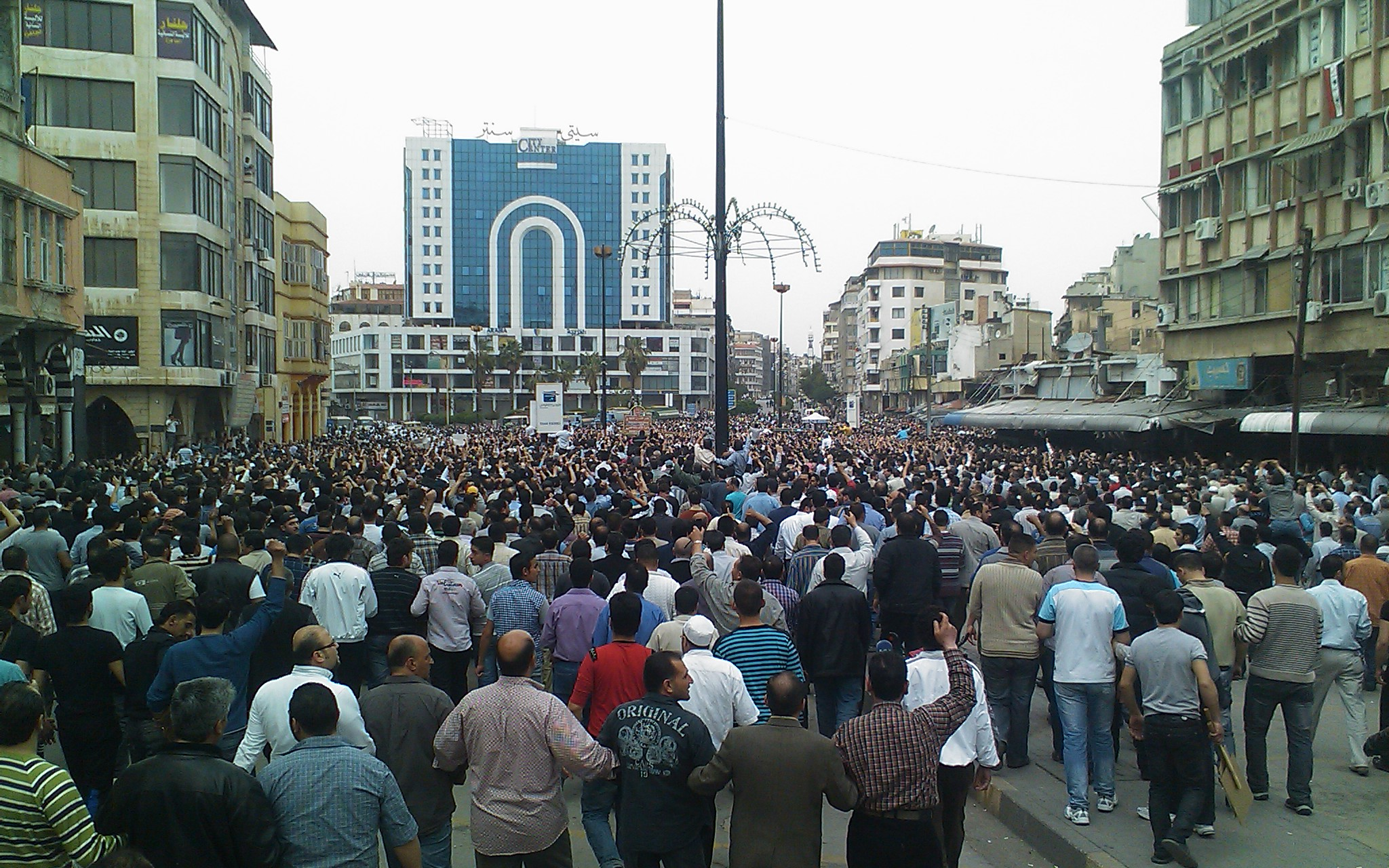
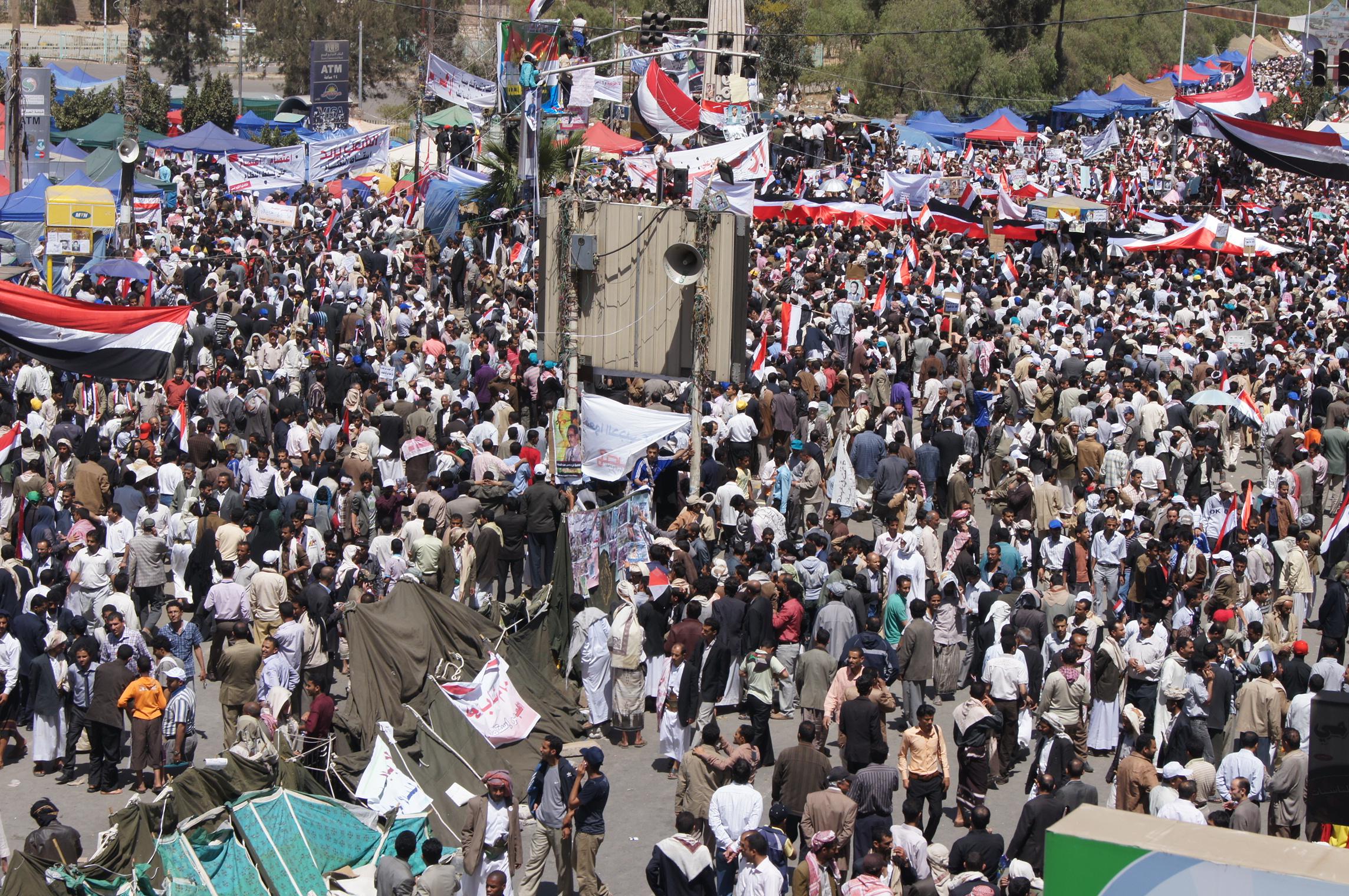
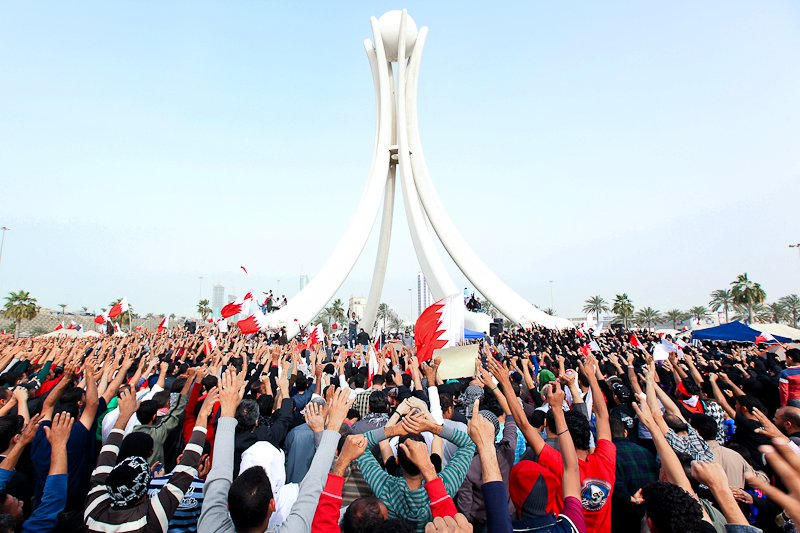
- Tunisia Egypt Libya Syria Yemen Bahrain
- Date: 17 December 2010 – December 2012 (~2 years)
- Location: North Africa and Middle East (MENA or Arab world)
- Caused by: 2000s energy crisis; Third wave of autocratization; Absolute monarchy; Demographic factors; Inflation; Kleptocracy; Police brutality; Political corruption; Poverty; Sectarianism; Unemployment; Self-immolation of Mohamed Bouazizi
- Goals: Democracy; Economic freedom; Employment; Free elections; Reform; Regime change
- Methods: Civil disobedience; Civil resistance; Civil war; Defection; Demonstrations; Insurgency; Internet activism; Media activism; Mutiny; Protest; Protest camp; Rebellion; Revolution; Riots; Self-immolation; Silent protest; Sit-in; Strike action; Urban warfare
- Result: Arab Spring concurrent incidents, Impact of the Arab Spring, Arab Winter, and 2018–2024 Arab protests Full result by country: Tunisia: President Zine El Abidine Ben Ali ousted, charged, exiled and government overthrown. The Islamic State insurgency begins.; Egypt: President Hosni Mubarak ousted, arrested, charged, and government overthrown. The Sinai insurgency and Egyptian crisis begin, which saw a second overthrow.; Libya: Leader Muammar Gaddafi killed following an eight-month civil war that saw a foreign military intervention and the government overthrown. A second civil war follows.; Yemen: President Ali Abdullah Saleh ousted, and power handed to a national unity government. The Yemeni civil war begins.; Syria: President Bashar al-Assad faced the Syrian Revolution against his rule which turned into a full-scale civil war, leading to his downfall in December 2024.; Bahrain: Civil uprising against the government crushed by authorities and Saudi-led intervention.; Kuwait, Lebanon and Oman: Government changes implemented in response to protests.; Morocco, Algeria and Jordan: Constitutional reforms implemented in response to protests.; United Arab Emirates, Iraq, Saudi Arabia, Mauritania, Sudan, Palestine, Djibouti: Protests.

Casualties
- Deaths: c. 61,000 deaths in total (international estimate; see table below)

The Arab Spring (Arabic: الربيع العربي, romanized: ar-rabīʻ al-ʻarabī) was a series of pro-democracy anti-government protests, uprisings, and armed rebellions that spread across much of the Arab world in the early 2010s. It began in Tunisia in response to the death of Mohamed Bouazizi by self-immolation. From Tunisia, the protests initially spread to five other countries: Libya, Egypt, Yemen, Syria and Bahrain. The rulers deposed include: Zine El Abidine Ben Ali of Tunisia, Muammar Gaddafi of Libya, and Hosni Mubarak of Egypt, all in 2011; and Ali Abdullah Saleh of Yemen in 2012. (Note: Other leaders who were targeted by the initial wave of protests but were deposed after its conclusion were Omar al-Bashir of Sudan and Abdelaziz Bouteflika of Algeria in 2019, and Bashar al-Assad of Syria in 2024. al-Bashir was deposed in a military coup d'état during the Sudanese revolution, Bouteflika resigned during the Hirak protests against his presidential candidacy for a fifth term, and Assad was removed from office by an opposition-led offensive after 13 years of civil war.) Major uprisings and social violence occurred, including riots, civil wars, or insurgencies. Sustained street demonstrations took place in Morocco, Iraq, Algeria, Lebanon, Jordan, Kuwait, Oman and Sudan. Minor protests took place in Djibouti, Mauritania, Palestine, Saudi Arabia and the Western Sahara. A major slogan of the demonstrators in the Arab world is ash-shaʻb yurīd isqāṭ an-niẓām! (Arabic: الشعب يريد إسقاط النظام, lit. 'the people want to bring down the regime').

The wave of initial revolutions and protests faded by mid- to late 2012, as many Arab Spring demonstrations were met with violent responses from authorities, pro-government militias, counterdemonstrators, and militaries. These attacks were answered with violence from protesters in some cases. Multiple large-scale conflicts followed: the Syrian civil war; the rise of ISIS, insurgency in Iraq and the following civil war; the Egyptian Crisis, election and removal from office of Mohamed Morsi, and subsequent unrest and insurgency; the Libyan crisis; and the Yemeni crisis and subsequent civil war. Regimes that lacked major oil wealth and hereditary succession arrangements were more likely to undergo regime change.

A power struggle continued after the immediate response to the Arab Spring. While leadership changed and regimes were held accountable, power vacuums opened across the Arab world. Ultimately, it resulted in a contentious battle between a consolidation of power by religious elites and the growing support for democracy in many Muslim-majority states. The early hopes that these popular movements would end corruption, increase political participation, and bring about greater economic equity quickly collapsed in the wake of the counter-revolutionary moves by foreign state actors in Yemen, the regional and international military interventions in Bahrain and Yemen, and the destructive civil wars in Syria, Iraq, Libya, and Yemen. Some referred to the succeeding and still ongoing conflicts as the Arab Winter.

A new wave of protests began in 2018 which led to the resignation of prime ministers Haider al-Abadi of Iraq in 2018 and Saad Hariri of Lebanon in 2020, and the overthrow of presidents Omar al-Bashir of Sudan and Abdelaziz Bouteflika of Algeria in 2019. Sometimes called the "Second Arab Spring", these events showed how the conditions that started the Arab Spring have not faded and political movements against authoritarianism and exploitation remain ongoing. Continued protest movements in Algeria, Sudan, Iraq, Lebanon, Egypt, and Syria have been seen as a continuation of the Arab Spring.

As of 2025, multiple conflicts are still continuing, which some have considered as originating from the Arab Spring. A major shift in the Syrian civil war occurred in December 2024, when a rebel offensive led to the fall of the Assad regime after over a decade of warfare. In Libya, a major civil war concluded, with foreign powers intervening. In Yemen, a civil war continues to affect the country.

== Etymology ==
The denomination "Arab Spring" is contested by some scholars and observers claiming that the term is problematic for several reasons. First, it was coined by Western commentators, not those involved in the events. The first specific use of the term Arab Spring as used to denote these events may have started with the US political journal Foreign Policy. Political scientist Marc Lynch described Arab Spring as "a term I may have unintentionally coined in a 6 January 2011 article" for Foreign Policy magazine. Protestors involved in the events however described their own political actions as "uprising" (intifada), Arab "awakening" (sahwa) and Arab "renaissance" (nahda), using expressions like al-marar al-Arabi (the Arab bitterness), karama (dignity) and thawra (revolution).

Some authors argue that western governments, scholars and media used the term to minimize people's revolutionary aims and discourse. Joseph Massad on Al Jazeera said the term was "part of a US strategy of controlling the movement's aims and goals" and directing it towards Western-style liberal democracy. When Arab Spring protests in some countries were followed by electoral success for Islamist parties, some American pundits coined the terms Islamist Spring and Islamist Winter.

The term "Spring" further illustrates the problematic nature of projecting Western expectations onto non-Western actors and practices. The terminology follows the Western example of the Revolutions of 1848 referred to as "Spring of Nations" and the Prague Spring in 1968, in which a Czech student, Jan Palach, set himself on fire as Mohamed Bouazizi did. In the aftermath of the Iraq War, it was used by various commentators and bloggers who anticipated a major Arab movement towards democratization. The term "Arab Spring" is thus contested as it signifies an expectation that the events would replicate the example of democratic revolutions set by the West.

== Causes ==
=== Pressures from within ===
The world watched the events of the Arab Spring unfold, "gripped by the narrative of a young generation peacefully rising up against oppressive authoritarianism to secure a more democratic political system and a brighter economic future". The Arab Spring is widely believed to have been instigated by dissatisfaction, particularly of youth and unions, with the rule of local governments, though some have speculated that wide gaps in income levels and pressures caused by the Great Recession may have had a hand as well. Some activists had taken part in programs sponsored by the US-funded National Endowment for Democracy, but the United States government claimed that they did not initiate the uprisings.

Numerous factors led to the protests, including issues such as reform, human rights violations, political corruption, economic decline, unemployment, extreme poverty, and a number of demographic structural factors, such as a large percentage of educated but dissatisfied youth within the entire population. Catalysts for the revolts in all Northern African and Persian Gulf countries included the concentration of wealth in the hands of monarchs in power for decades, insufficient transparency of its redistribution, corruption, and especially the refusal of the youth to accept the status quo.

Some protesters looked to the Turkish model as an ideal (contested but peaceful elections, fast-growing but liberal economy, secular constitution but Islamist government). Other analysts blamed the rise in food prices on commodity traders and the conversion of crops to ethanol. Yet others have claimed that the context of high rates of unemployment and corrupt political regimes led to dissent movements within the region.

=== Social media ===
In the wake of the Arab Spring protests, a considerable amount of attention focused on the role of social media and digital technologies in allowing citizens within areas affected by "the Arab Uprisings" as a means for collective activism to circumvent state-operated media channels. The influence of social media on political activism during the Arab Spring has, however, been much debated. Protests took place both in states with a very high level of Internet usage (such as Bahrain with 88% of its population online in 2011) and in states with some of the lowest Internet penetration (Yemen and Libya).

The use of social media platforms more than doubled in Arab countries during the protests, with the exception of Libya. Some researchers have shown how collective intelligence, dynamics of the crowd in participatory systems such as social media, has immense power to support a collective action—such as foment a political change. As of 5 April 2011, the number of Facebook users in the Arab world surpassed 27.7 million people. Some critics have argued that digital technologies and other forms of communication—videos, cellular phones, blogs, photos, emails, and text messages—have brought about the concept of a "digital democracy" in parts of North Africa affected by the uprisings.

Facebook, Twitter, and other major social media played a key role in the movement of Egyptian and Tunisian activists in particular. Nine out of ten Egyptians and Tunisians responded to a poll that they used Facebook to organize protests and spread awareness. This large population of young Egyptian men referred to themselves as "the Facebook generation", exemplifying their escape from their non-modernized past. Furthermore, 28% of Egyptians and 29% of Tunisians from the same poll said that blocking Facebook greatly hindered and/or disrupted communication. Social media sites were a platform for different movements formed by many frustrated citizens, including the 2008 "April 6 Youth Movement" organized by Ahmed Mahed, which set out to organize and promote a nationwide labor strike and which inspired the later creation of the "Progressive Youth of Tunisia".

During the Arab Spring, people created pages on Facebook to raise awareness about alleged crimes against humanity, such as police brutality in the Egyptian Revolution (see Wael Ghonim and Death of Khaled Mohamed Saeed). Whether the project of raising awareness was primarily pursued by Arabs themselves or simply advertised by Western social media users is a matter of debate. Jared Keller, a journalist for The Atlantic, claims that most activists and protesters used Facebook (among other social media) to organize; however, what influenced Iran was "good old-fashioned word of mouth". Jared Keller argued that the sudden and anomalous social media output was caused from Westerners witnessing the situation(s), and then broadcasting them. The Middle East and North Africa used texting, emailing, and blogging only to organize and communicate information about internal local protests.

A study by Zeynep Tufekci of the University of North Carolina and Christopher Wilson of the United Nations Development Program concluded that "social media in general, and Facebook in particular, provided new sources of information the regime could not easily control and were crucial in shaping how citizens made individual decisions about participating in protests, the logistics of protest, and the likelihood of success." Marc Lynch of George Washington University said, "while social media boosters envisioned the creation of a new public sphere based on dialogue and mutual respect, the reality is that Islamists and their adversaries retreat to their respective camps, reinforcing each other's prejudices while throwing the occasional rhetorical bomb across the no-man's land that the center has become." Lynch also stated in a Foreign Policy article, "There is something very different about scrolling through pictures and videos of unified, chanting Yemeni or Egyptian crowds demanding democratic change and waking up to a gory image of a headless 6-year-old girl on your Facebook news feed."

Social networks were not the only instrument for rebels to coordinate their efforts and communicate. In the countries with the lowest Internet penetration and the limited role of social networks, such as Yemen and Libya, the role of mainstream electronic media devices—cellular phones, emails, and video clips (e.g., YouTube)—was very important to cast the light on the situation in the country and spread the word about the protests in the outside world. In Egypt, in Cairo particularly, mosques were one of the main platforms to coordinate the protest actions and raise awareness to the masses.

Conversely, scholarship literature on the Middle East, political scientist Gregory Gause has found, had failed to predict the events of the Arab uprisings. Commenting on an early article by Gause whose review of a decade of Middle Eastern studies led him to conclude that almost no scholar foresaw what was coming, Chair of Ottoman and Turkish Studies at Tel Aviv University Ehud R. Toledano writes that Gause's finding is "a strong and sincere mea culpa" and that his criticism of Middle East experts for "underestimating the hidden forces driving change ... while they worked instead to explain the unshakable stability of repressive authoritarian regimes" is well-placed. Toledano then quotes Gause saying, "As they wipe the egg off their faces," those experts "need to reconsider long-held assumptions about the Arab world."

=== Diplomacy ===
The inability of the United States to support its authoritarian allies after the 2008 financial crisis, the Iraq War and the Afghanistan War was regarded as a necessary condition for the Arab Spring.

== History ==
=== Events leading up to the Arab Spring ===
Tunisia experienced a series of conflicts during the three years leading up to the Arab Spring, the most notable occurring in the mining area of Gafsa in 2008, where protests continued for many months. These protests included rallies, sit-ins, and strikes, during which there were two fatalities, an unspecified number of wounded, and dozens of arrests.

In Egypt, the labor movement had been strong for years, with more than 3000 labor actions since 2004, and provided an important venue for organizing protests and collective action. One important demonstration was an attempted workers' strike on 6 April 2008 at the state-run textile factories of al-Mahalla al-Kubra, just outside Cairo. The idea for this type of demonstration spread throughout the country, promoted by computer-literate working-class youths and their supporters among middle-class college students. A Facebook page, set up to promote the strike, attracted tens of thousands of followers and provided the platform for sustained political action in pursuit of the "long revolution". The government mobilized to break the strike through infiltration and riot police, and while the regime was somewhat successful in forestalling a strike, dissidents formed the "6 April Committee" of youths and labor activists, which became one of the major forces calling for the anti-Mubarak demonstration on 25 January in Tahrir Square.

In Algeria, discontent had been building for years over a number of issues. In February 2008, US Ambassador Robert Ford wrote in a leaked diplomatic cable that Algeria is "unhappy" with long-standing political alienation; that social discontent persisted throughout the country, with food strikes occurring almost every week; that there were demonstrations every day somewhere in the country; and that the Algerian government was corrupt and fragile. Some claimed that during 2010 there were as many as "9,700 riots and unrests" throughout the country. Many protests focused on issues such as education and health care, while others cited rampant corruption.

In Western Sahara, the Gdeim Izik protest camp was erected 12 kilometres (7.5 mi) southeast of El Aaiún by a group of young Sahrawis on 9 October 2010. Their intention was to demonstrate against labor discrimination, unemployment, looting of resources, and human rights abuses. The camp contained between 12000 and 20000 inhabitants, but on 8 November 2010 it was destroyed and its inhabitants evicted by Moroccan security forces. The security forces faced strong opposition from some young Sahrawi civilians, and rioting soon spread to El Aaiún and other towns within the territory, resulting in an unknown number of injuries and deaths. Violence against Sahrawis in the aftermath of the protests was cited as a reason for renewed protests months later, after the start of the Arab Spring.

The catalyst for the escalation of protests was the self-immolation of Tunisian Mohamed Bouazizi. Unable to find work and selling fruit at a roadside stand, Bouazizi had his wares confiscated by a municipal inspector on 17 December 2010. An hour later he doused himself with gasoline and set himself afire. His death on 4 January 2011 brought together various groups dissatisfied with the existing system, including many unemployed persons, political and human rights activists, labor and trade unionists, students, professors, lawyers, and others to begin the Tunisian Revolution.

=== Protests and uprisings ===
The series of protests and demonstrations across the Middle East and North Africa that commenced in 2010 became known as the "Arab Spring", and sometimes as the "Arab Spring and Winter", "Arab Awakening", or "Arab Uprisings", even though not all the participants in the protests were Arab. It was sparked by the first protests that occurred in Tunisia on 18 December 2010 in Sidi Bouzid, following Mohamed Bouazizi's self-immolation in protest of police corruption and ill treatment. With the success of the protests in Tunisia, a wave of unrest sparked by the Tunisian "Burning Man" struck Algeria, Jordan, Egypt, and Yemen, then spread to other countries. The largest, most organized demonstrations often occurred on a "day of rage", usually Friday afternoon prayers. The protests also triggered similar unrest outside the region. Contrary to expectations the revolutions were not led by Islamists:

Even though the Islamists were certainly present during the uprisings, they never determined the directions of these movements—after all, there was hardly any central leadership in any of the uprisings. Some Islamist groups initially were even reluctant to join in the protests, and the major religious groups in Egypt—Salafis, al-Azhar, and the Coptic Church—initially opposed the revolution. The mufti of Egypt, Ali Gomaa, proclaimed that rising against a lawful ruler—President Mubarak—was haram, not permissible. And the Muslim Brotherhood's old guard joined in the protests reluctantly only after being pushed by the group's young people.

The Arab Spring caused the "biggest transformation of the Middle East since decolonization". By the end of February 2012, rulers had been forced from power in Tunisia, Egypt, Libya, and Yemen; civil uprisings had erupted in Bahrain and Syria; major protests had broken out in Algeria, Iraq, Jordan, Kuwait, Morocco, Oman, and Sudan; and minor protests had occurred in Mauritania, Saudi Arabia, Djibouti, Western Sahara, and Palestine. Tunisian President Zine El Abidine Ben Ali fled to Saudi Arabia on 14 January 2011 following the Tunisian Revolution protests. Egyptian President Hosni Mubarak resigned on 11 February 2011 after 18 days of massive protests, ending his 30-year presidency. The Libyan leader Muammar Gaddafi was overthrown on 23 August 2011, after the National Transitional Council (NTC) took control of Bab al-Azizia. He was killed on 20 October 2011 in his hometown of Sirte after the NTC took control of the city. Yemeni President Ali Abdullah Saleh signed the GCC power-transfer deal in which a presidential election was held, resulting in his successor Abdrabbuh Mansur Hadi formally replacing him as president on 27 February 2012 in exchange for immunity from prosecution. Weapons and Tuareg fighters returning from the Libyan Civil War stoked a simmering conflict in Mali that has been described as 'fallout' from the Arab Spring in North Africa.

During this period, several leaders announced their intentions to step down at the end of their current terms. Sudanese President Omar al-Bashir announced that he would not seek reelection in 2015 (he ultimately retracted his announcement and ran anyway), as did Iraqi Prime Minister Nouri al-Maliki, whose term was to end in 2014, although there were violent demonstrations demanding his immediate resignation in 2011. Protests in Jordan also caused the sacking of four successive governments by King Abdullah. The popular unrest in Kuwait also resulted in the resignation of Prime Minister Nasser Al-Sabah's cabinet.

The geopolitical implications of the protests drew global attention. Some protesters were nominated for the 2011 Nobel Peace Prize. Tawakkol Karman of Yemen was co-recipient of the 2011 Nobel Peace Prize due to her role organizing peaceful protests. In December 2011 Time magazine named "The Protester" its "Person of the Year". Spanish photographer Samuel Aranda won the 2011 World Press Photo award for his image of a Yemeni woman holding an injured family member, taken during the civil uprising in Yemen on 15 October 2011.

==== Summary of conflicts by country ====
Government overthrown more than once Government overthrown Civil war Protests and governmental changes Major protests Minor protests Other protests and militant action outside the Arab world

Country	Date started	Status of protests	Outcome	Death toll	Situation
Western Sahara (Note: Noam Chomsky alleges that the Gdeim Izik protest camp was the start of the Arab Spring. However, the current academic consensus considers Tunisia to be the actual start of the Arab Spring.)	9 October 2010	Ended on 8 November 2010	Violent military dismantling of the Gdeim Izik protest camp; Trial and torture of leading participants; Changes in the Moroccan administration of Western Sahara	15—47	Major protests
Tunisia	18 December 2010	Government overthrown on 14 January 2011	Overthrow of Zine El Abidine Ben Ali; Ben Ali flees into exile in Saudi Arabia: Resignation of Prime Minister Ghannouchi; Dissolution of the political police; Dissolution of the RCD, the former ruling party of Tunisia and liquidation of its assets; Release of political prisoners; Elections to a Constituent Assembly on 23 October 2011	338	Government overthrown
Algeria	29 December 2010	Ended on 10 January 2012	Lifting of the 19-year-old state of emergency	8	Major protests
Jordan	14 January 2011	Ended on 4 October 2012	In February 2011, King Abdullah II dismisses Prime Minister Rifai and his cabinet; In April 2011, King Abdullah creates the Royal Committee to Review the Constitution with directions to review the Constitution in accordance with calls for reform. On 30 September 2011, Abdullah approves changes to all 42 articles of the Constitution; In October 2011, Abdullah dismisses Prime Minister Marouf al-Bakhit and his cabinet after complaints of slow progress on promised reforms; In April 2012, as the protests continue, Awn Al-Khasawneh resigns and Abdullah appoints Fayez Tarawneh as the new Prime Minister; In October 2012, Abdullah dissolves the parliament for new early elections, and appoints Abdullah Ensour as the new Prime Minister	3	Protests and governmental changes
Oman	17 January 2011	Ended on 8 April 2011	Economic concessions by Sultan Qaboos bin Said al Said; Dismissal of ministers; Granting of lawmaking powers to Oman's elected legislature	2–6	Protests and governmental changes
Saudi Arabia	21 January 2011 (Official protests began on 11 March 2011)	Ended on 24 December 2012	Economic concessions by King Abdullah; Male-only municipal elections held 29 September 2011; Abdullah announces women's approval to vote and be elected in the 2015 municipal elections and to be nominated to the Shura Council; Commitment to the expansion of women's rights in Saudi Arabia, especially after the ascension of Mohammad bin Salman to the position of Crown Prince.	50+	Minor protests
Egypt	25 January 2011	Two governments overthrown (On 11 February 2011 and 3 July 2013), Egyptian Crisis follows until 2014	Overthrow of Hosni Mubarak, who is later convicted of corruption and ordered to stand trial for ordering the killing of protesters.: Resignation of Prime Minister(s) Ahmed Nazif and Ahmed Shafik; Assumption of power by the Supreme Council of the Armed Forces; Suspension of the Constitution, dissolution of the Parliament; Disbanding of State Security Investigations Service; Dissolution of the NDP, Egypt's former ruling party, and transfer of its assets to the state; Arrest and prosecution of Mubarak, his family, and his former ministers; Lifting of the 31-year-old state of emergency; New presidential election held to replace Mubarak as president; Muslim Brotherhood-affiliated Mohamed Morsi elected and inaugurated; Sinai insurgency begins; Overthrow of Mohamed Morsi, who was convicted of espionage and inciting the killing of protestors.: Mass protests against Morsi's rule; Coup d'état by the Egyptian Armed Forces results in Morsi's removal from office; Designation of Adly Mansour as interim president and calls for early elections	846	Two governments overthrown (Mubarak government • Morsi government)
Syria	26 January 2011 (Major protests began on 15 March 2011)	Popular uprising and revolution, which escalated into a full-scale civil war by June 2012	Syrian revolution begins, followed by civil war: Release of some political prisoners; Dismissal of provincial governors; Resignation of the Muhammad Naji al-Otari government; Lifting of the 48-year-old state of emergency; Resignations of members of parliament; Large defections from the Syrian army and clashes between soldiers and defectors; Beginning of the Syrian insurgency and formation of the Free Syrian Army; Escalation of the conflict after the Houla massacre perpetrated by Ba'athist military forces and deterioration into full-scale civil war by June 2012; Overthrow of Bashar al-Assad; Assad flees into exile in Russia: Beginning of Western Syria clashes	656,493+	Civil war and government overthrown
Yemen	27 January 2011	Two governments overthrown (On 27 February 2012 and 22 January 2015). Yemeni crisis and civil war follows.	Overthrow of Ali Abdullah Saleh; Saleh granted immunity from prosecution; is killed in 2017 by the Houthis: Resignation of Prime Minister Ali Muhammad Mujawar; Resignation of MPs from the ruling party; Occupation of several areas of Yemeni territory by al-Qaeda and Houthi rebels; Restructure of the military forces by sacking several of its leaders; Approval of Saleh's immunity from prosecution by Yemeni legislators; Presidential election held to replace Saleh; Abdrabbuh Mansur Hadi elected and inaugurated; Yemeni crisis begins, followed by a civil war	2000	Civil war and two governments overthrown (Saleh government • Hadi government)
Djibouti	28 January 2011	Ended on 11 March 2011		2	Minor protests
Sudan	30 January 2011	Ended on 26 October 2013	President Omar al-Bashir announces he will not seek another term in 2015; Bashir chosen as ruling party candidate for 2015 election, in spite of previous comments	200+	Major protests
Palestinian Authority	10 February 2011	Ended on 5 October 2012	Prime Minister Salam Fayyad states that he is "willing to resign" in response to the protests; Fayyad resigns on 13 April 2013 because of political differences between him and the Palestinian president Mahmoud Abbas over the finance portfolio	None	Minor protests
Iraq	12 February 2011	Ended 23 December 2011, instability and eventually war against terrorism follows	Prime Minister Nouri al-Maliki announces he will not run for a 3rd term; Resignation of provincial governors and local authorities; Two-thirds wage increase for Sahwa militia members; Elections held and Haider al-Abadi elected; ISIL terrorists take broad swathes of Iraq; Start of War in Iraq (2013–2017)	35	Protests and beginning of civil war
Bahrain	14 February 2011	Ended on 18 March 2011	Economic concessions by King Hamad bin Isa Al Khalifa; Release of political prisoners; Negotiations with Shia representatives; GCC intervention at the request of the Government of Bahrain; Head of the National Security Apparatus removed from post; Formation of a committee to implement BICI report recommendations	120	Sustained civil disorder and government changes
Libya	15 February 2011 (Major protests began on 17 February 2011).	Government overthrown on 23 August 2011, crisis follows	Overthrow of Muammar Gaddafi; Gaddafi killed by rebel forces: Government defeated by armed revolt with UN-mandated military intervention; Assumption of interim control by the National Transitional Council; Beginning of sporadic low-level fighting and clashes	9,400–20,000	Government overthrown and civil war
Kuwait	19 February 2011	Ended in December 2012	Resignation of Prime Minister Nasser Al-Sabah; Dissolution of the Parliament	None	Protests and governmental changes
Morocco	20 February 2011	Ended in March–April 2012	Political concessions by King Mohammed VI; New constitution adopted following a referendum; Respect to civil rights and an end to corruption	6	Protests and governmental changes
Mauritania	25 February 2011	Ended in 2013		3	Minor protests
Lebanon	27 February 2011	Ended on 15 December 2011		None	Protests and governmental changes
Borders of Israel	15 May 2011	Ended on 5 June 2011		35	Major protests
Total death toll and other consequences:				61,080+ (combined estimate of events)	4 governments overthrown as part of the events; Six protests leading to governmental changes; Five major protests; Four minor protests; 3 governments overthrown in the aftermath; Four civil wars in the aftermath (Syria, Iraq, Libya and Yemen)

=== Major events ===
==== Bahrain (2011) ====
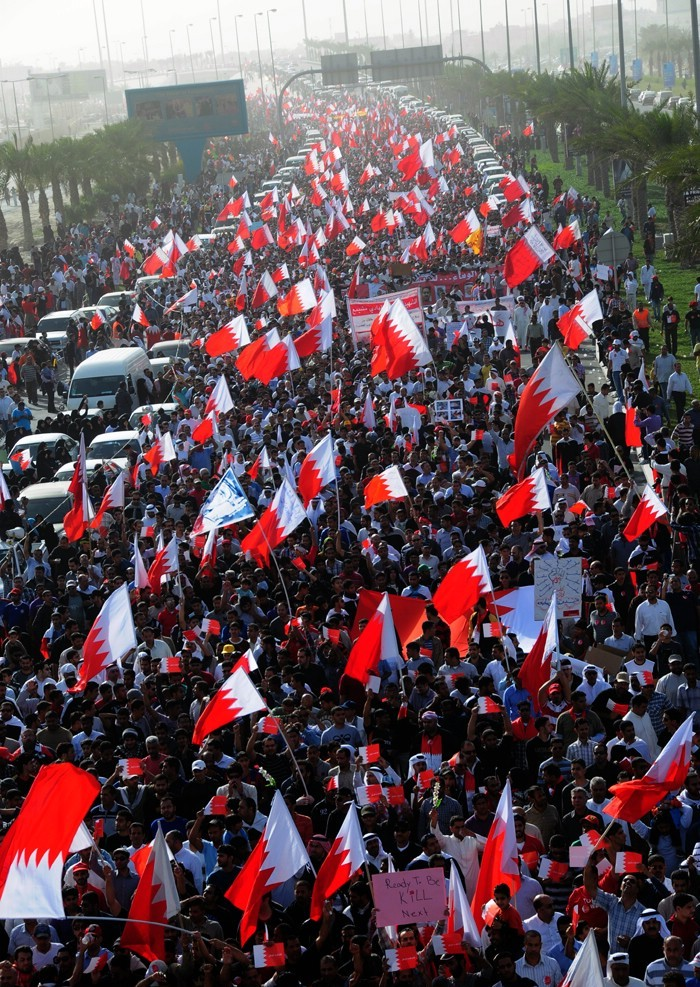
Over 100000 Bahrainis taking part in the "March of Loyalty to Martyrs" in Manama, honoring political dissidents killed by security forces

The protests in Bahrain started on 14 February, and were initially aimed at achieving greater political freedom and respect for human rights; they were not intended to directly threaten the monarchy. Lingering frustration among the Shiite majority with being ruled by the Sunni government was a major root cause, but the protests in Tunisia and Egypt are cited as the inspiration for the demonstrations. The protests were largely peaceful until a pre-dawn raid by police on 17 February to clear protestors from Pearl Roundabout in Manama, in which police killed four protesters. Following the raid, some protesters began to expand their aims to a call for the end of the monarchy. On 18 February, army forces opened fire on protesters when they tried to reenter the roundabout, fatally wounding one. The following day protesters reoccupied Pearl Roundabout after the government ordered troops and police to withdraw. Subsequent days saw large demonstrations; on 21 February a pro-government Gathering of National Unity drew tens of thousands, whilst on 22 February the number of protestors at the Pearl Roundabout peaked at over 150000 after more than 100000 protesters marched there and were coming under fire from the Bahraini Military which killed around 20 and injured over 100 protestors. On 14 March, GCC forces (composed mainly of Saudi and UAE troops) were requested by the government and occupied the country.

King Hamad bin Isa Al Khalifa declared a three-month state of emergency on 15 March and asked the military to reassert its control as clashes spread across the country. On 16 March, armed soldiers and riot police cleared the protesters' camp in the Pearl Roundabout, in which 3 policemen and 3 protesters were reportedly killed. Later, on 18 March, the government tore down Pearl Roundabout monument. After the lifting of emergency law on 1 June, several large rallies were staged by the opposition parties. Smaller-scale protests and clashes outside of the capital have continued to occur almost daily. On 9 March 2012, over 100000 protested in what the opposition called "the biggest march in our history".

The police response has been described as a "brutal" crackdown on peaceful and unarmed protestors, including doctors and bloggers. The police carried out midnight house raids in Shia neighbourhoods, beatings at checkpoints, and denial of medical care in a "campaign of intimidation". More than 2,929 people have been arrested, and at least five people died due to torture while in police custody. On 23 November 2011, the Bahrain Independent Commission of Inquiry released its report on its investigation of the events, finding that the government had systematically tortured prisoners and committed other human rights violations. It also rejected the government's claims that the protests were instigated by Iran. Although the report found that systematic torture had stopped, the Bahraini government has refused entry to several international human rights groups and news organizations, and delayed a visit by a UN inspector. More than 80 people had died since the start of the uprising.

Even a decade after the 2011 uprisings, the situation in Bahrain remained unchanged. The regime continued suppression against all forms of dissent. Years after the demonstrations, the Bahraini authorities are known to have accelerated their crackdown. They have been targeting human rights defenders, journalists, Shiite political groups and social media critics.

==== Saudi Arabia ====
Saudi government forces quashed protests in the country and assisted Bahraini authorities in suppressing demonstrations there.

Jamal Khashoggi, a Saudi critic, covered the Arab Spring and spoke out against the Saudi government during this time. He was assassinated by assailants tied to the government in 2018.

==== Egypt (2011) ====
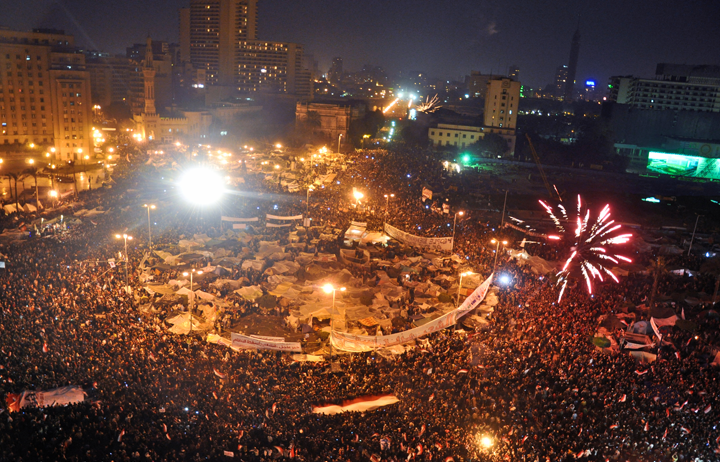
Celebrations in Tahrir Square after Omar Suleiman's statement concerning Hosni Mubarak's resignation

Inspired by the uprising in Tunisia and prior to his entry as a central figure in Egyptian politics, potential presidential candidate Mohamed ElBaradei warned of a "Tunisia-style explosion" in Egypt.

Protests in Egypt began on 25 January 2011 and ran for 18 days. Beginning around midnight on 28 January, the Egyptian government attempted, somewhat successfully, to eliminate the nation's Internet access, in order to inhibit the protesters' ability to use media activism to organize through social media. Later that day, as tens of thousands protested on the streets of Egypt's major cities, President Hosni Mubarak dismissed his government, later appointing a new cabinet. Mubarak also appointed the first Vice President in almost 30 years.

The U.S. embassy and international students began a voluntary evacuation near the end of January, as violence and rumors of violence escalated.

On 10 February, Mubarak ceded all presidential power to Vice President Omar Suleiman, but soon thereafter announced that he would remain as president until the end of his term. However, protests continued the next day, and Suleiman quickly announced that Mubarak had resigned from the presidency and transferred power to the Armed Forces of Egypt. The military immediately dissolved the Egyptian Parliament, suspended the Constitution of Egypt, and promised to lift the nation's thirty-year "emergency laws". A civilian, Essam Sharaf, was appointed as Prime Minister of Egypt on 4 March to widespread approval among Egyptians in Tahrir Square. Violent protests, however, continued through the end of 2011 as many Egyptians expressed concern about the Supreme Council of the Armed Forces' perceived sluggishness in instituting reforms and their grip on power.

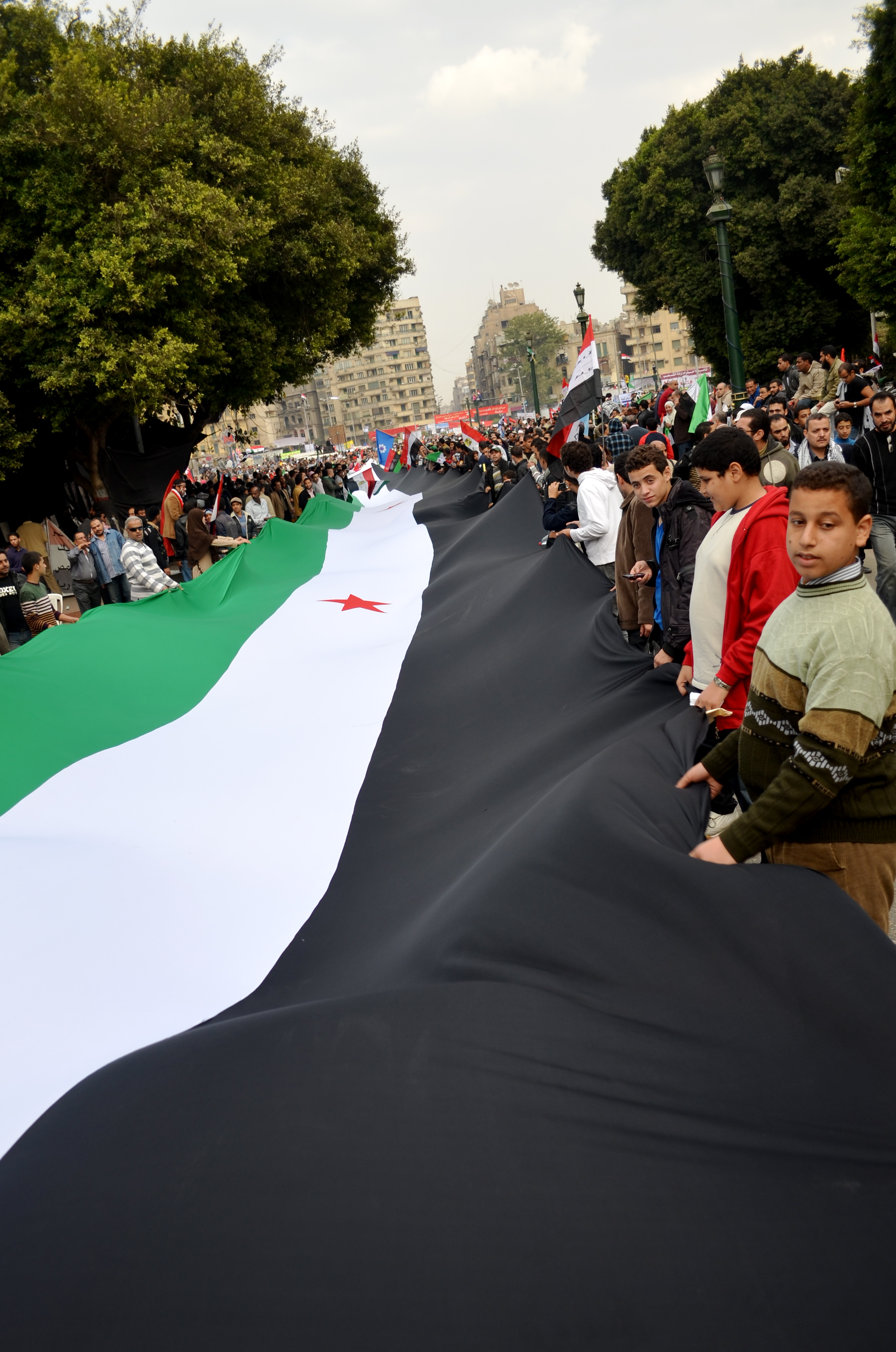
Demonstration in Cairo in solidarity with protestors in Syria, 4 February 2012

Hosni Mubarak and his former interior minister Habib el-Adly were sentenced to life in prison on the basis of their failure to stop the killings during the first six days of the 2011 Egyptian Revolution. His successor, the Muslim Brotherhood-affiliated Islamist Mohamed Morsi, won a presidential election in 2012 regarded as free and fair by election observers, and was subsequently sworn in before judges at the Supreme Constitutional Court. Fresh protests against Morsi erupted in Egypt on 22 November 2012. More protests against Morsi's rule occurred one year into Morsi's presidency in June 2013, and on 3 July 2013, the military overthrew Morsi's government, thus removing him from office.

The Arab Spring was generally considered to have been a success in Egypt, much like in Tunisia. However, a December 2020 report published by PRI's The World, a US-based public radio news magazine, suggests otherwise. The report says that the Egyptian government increased the amount of executions that it carried out by more than twofold, with the report saying that the government put to death approximately 60 people. This number, according to the report, included human rights activists of the Egyptian Initiative for Personal Rights (EIPR), who were arrested in November 2020. The executive director of the Project on Middle East Democracy, Stephen McInerney, said that a majority of pro-democracy activists had escaped Egypt, while those who could not had gone into hiding. The Project on Middle East Democracy mentioned using encrypted communication channels to talk to the activists regarding the protection of their whereabouts. Western countries are perceived to have generally overlooked these issues, including the United States, France, and several other European countries. The founder of the Tahrir Institute for Middle East Policy in Washington, DC believed that even ten years after the Arab Spring, Egypt was at its lowest for human rights.

==== Libya (2011) ====
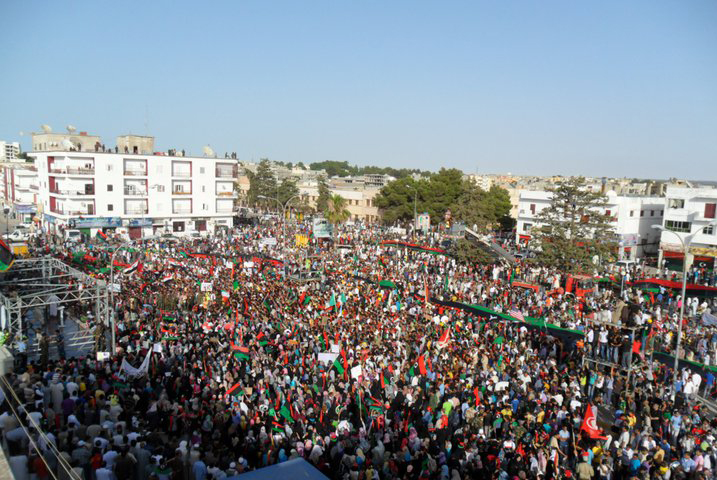
Thousands of demonstrators gather in Bayda.

Anti-government protests began in Libya on 15 February 2011. By 18 February, the opposition controlled most of Benghazi, the country's second-largest city. The government dispatched elite troops and militia in an attempt to recapture it, but they were repelled. By 20 February, protests had spread to the capital Tripoli, leading to a television address by Saif al-Islam Gaddafi, who warned the protestors that their country could descend into civil war. The rising death toll, numbering in the thousands, drew international condemnation and resulted in the resignation of several Libyan diplomats, along with calls for the government's dismantlement.

Amidst ongoing efforts by demonstrators and rebel forces to wrest control of Tripoli from the Jamahiriya, the opposition set up an interim government in Benghazi to oppose Colonel Muammar Gaddafi's rule. However, despite initial opposition success, government forces subsequently took back much of the Mediterranean coast.

On 17 March, United Nations Security Council Resolution 1973 was adopted, authorising a no-fly zone over Libya, and "all necessary measures" to protect civilians. Two days later, France, the United States and the United Kingdom intervened in Libya with a bombing campaign against pro-Gaddafi forces. A coalition of 27 states from Europe and the Middle East soon joined the intervention. The forces were driven back from the outskirts of Benghazi, and the rebels mounted an offensive, capturing scores of towns across the coast of Libya. The offensive stalled however, and a counter-offensive by the government retook most of the towns, until a stalemate was formed between Brega and Ajdabiya, the former being held by the government and the latter in the hands of the rebels. Focus then shifted to the west of the country, where bitter fighting continued. After a three-month-long battle, a loyalist siege of rebel-held Misrata, the third largest city in Libya, was broken in large part due to coalition air strikes. The four major fronts of combat were generally considered to be the Nafusa Mountains, the Tripolitanian coast, the Gulf of Sidra, and the southern Libyan Desert.

In late August, anti-Gaddafi fighters captured Tripoli, scattering Gaddafi's government and marking the end of his 42 years of power. Many institutions of the government, including Gaddafi and several top government officials, regrouped in Sirte, which Gaddafi declared to be Libya's new capital. Others fled to Sabha, Bani Walid, and remote reaches of the Libyan Desert, or to surrounding countries. However, Sabha fell in late September, Bani Walid was captured after a grueling siege weeks later, and on 20 October, fighters under the aegis of the National Transitional Council seized Sirte, killing Gaddafi in the process. However, after Gaddafi was killed, the Civil War continued.

==== Syria (2011–2024) ====
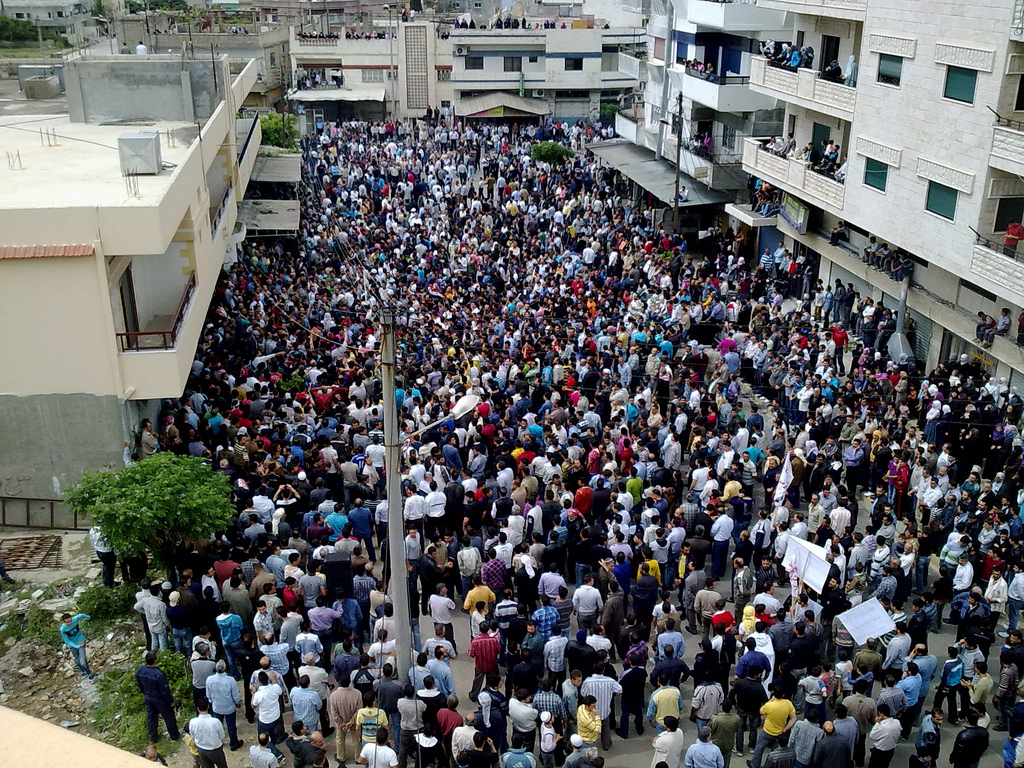
Anti-government demonstrations in Baniyas

Protests in Syria started on 26 January 2011, when a police officer assaulted a man in public at "Al-Hareeka Street" in old Damascus. The man was arrested right after the assault. As a result, protesters called for the freedom of the arrested man. Soon a "day of rage" was set for 4–5 February, but it was uneventful. On 6 March, the Syrian security forces arrested about 15 children in Daraa, in southern Syria, for writing slogans against the government. Soon protests erupted over the arrest and abuse of the children. Daraa was to be the first city to protest against the Ba'athist government, which has been ruling Syria since 1963.

Thousands of protesters gathered in Damascus, Aleppo, al-Hasakah, Daraa, Deir ez-Zor, and Hama on 15 March, with recently released politician Suhair Atassi becoming an unofficial spokesperson for the "Syrian revolution". The next day there were reports of approximately 3000 arrests and a few casualties, but there are no official figures on the number of deaths. On 18 April 2011, approximately 100,000 protesters sat in the central Square of Homs calling for the resignation of president Bashar al-Assad. Protests continued through July 2011, the government responding with harsh security clampdowns and military operations in several districts, especially in the north. On 31 July, Syrian army tanks stormed several cities, including Hama, Deir Ez-Zour, Abu Kamal, and Herak near Daraa. At least 136 people were killed, the highest death toll in any day since the start of the uprising. On 5 August 2011, an anti-government demonstration took place in Syria called "God is with us", during which the Syrian security forces shot the protesters from inside the ambulances, killing 11 people. The Arab Spring events in Syria subsequently escalated into the Syrian civil war, in which between about 580,000 to 656,000 people were killed. The war caused massive political instability and economic hardship in Syria, with the Syrian pound plunging to new lows. It also resulted in one of the largest refugee crises.

On 8 December 2024, the Assad regime collapsed during a major offensive by opposition forces. The offensive was spearheaded by Hay'at Tahrir al-Sham (HTS) and supported mainly by the Turkish-backed Syrian National Army. As another rebel coalition advanced towards Damascus, reports emerged that Bashar al-Assad fled the capital aboard a plane to Russia, where he joined his family, already in exile, and was granted asylum. Following Assad's departure, opposition forces declared victory on state television. Concurrently, the Russian Ministry of Foreign Affairs confirmed Assad's resignation and his departure from Syria.

The fall of the Assad regime after 54 years of rule and 13 years of civil war was met with shock and surprise throughout Syria and the world. Syrian opposition fighters were surprised at how quickly the Syrian government collapsed in the wake of their offensive. Analysts viewed the event as a significant blow to Iran's Axis of Resistance due to the use of Syria as a waypoint to supply arms and supplies to their ally Hezbollah.

==== Tunisia (2010–2011) ====
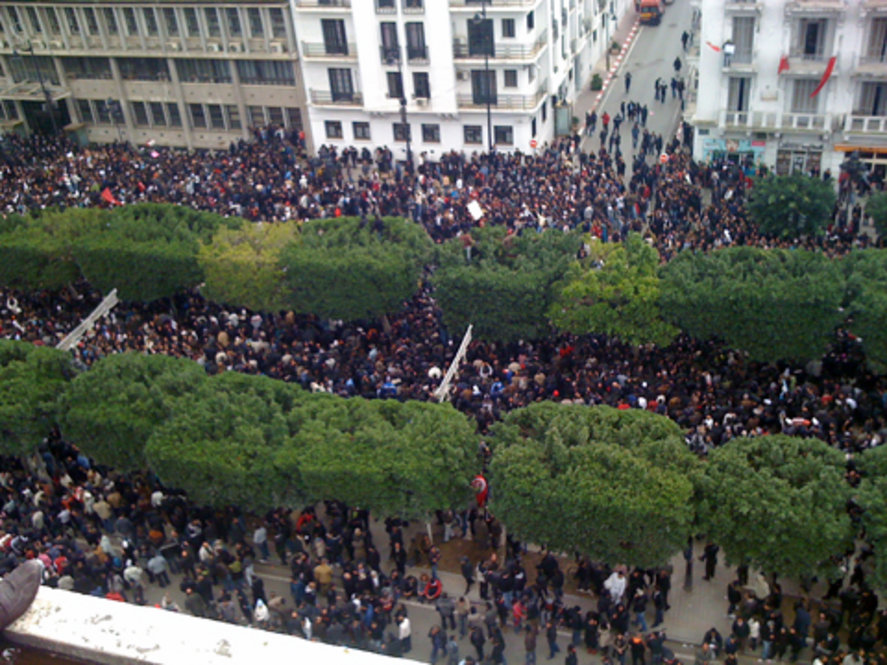
Protesters on Avenue Habib Bourguiba, downtown Tunis on 14 January 2011, a few hours before president Zine El Abidine Ben Ali fled the country

Following the self-immolation of Mohamed Bouazizi in Sidi Bouzid, a series of increasingly violent street demonstrations through December 2010 ultimately led to the ousting of longtime President Zine El Abidine Ben Ali on 14 January 2011. The demonstrations were preceded by high unemployment, food inflation, corruption, lack of freedom of speech and other forms of political freedom, and poor living conditions. The protests constituted the most dramatic wave of social and political unrest in Tunisia in three decades and resulted in scores of deaths and injuries, most of which were the result of action by police and security forces against demonstrators. Ben Ali fled into exile in Saudi Arabia, ending his 23 years in power and was tried for corruption in absentia.

A state of emergency was declared and a caretaker coalition government was created following Ben Ali's departure, which included members of Ben Ali's party, the Constitutional Democratic Rally (RCD), as well as opposition figures from other ministries. The five newly appointed non-RCD ministers resigned almost immediately. As a result of continued daily protests, on 27 January Prime Minister Mohamed Ghannouchi reshuffled the government, removing all former RCD members other than himself, and on 6 February the former ruling party was suspended; later, on 9 March, it was dissolved. Following further public protests, Ghannouchi himself resigned on 27 February, and Beji Caid Essebsi became prime minister.

On 23 October 2011 Tunisians voted in the first post-revolution election to elect representatives to a 217-member constituent assembly that would be responsible for the new constitution. The leading Islamist party, Ennahda, won 37% of the vote, and elected 42 women to the Constituent Assembly.

On 26 January 2014 a new constitution was adopted. The constitution is seen as progressive, increasing human rights, gender equality, and government duties toward people, laying the groundwork for a new parliamentary system and making Tunisia a decentralized and open government.

On 26 October 2014 Tunisia held its first parliamentary elections since the 2011 Arab Spring and its presidential election on 23 November 2014, finishing its transition to a democratic state. These elections were characterized by a decline in Ennahdha's popularity in favor of the secular Nidaa Tounes party, which became the first party of the country.

==== United Arab Emirates (2011) ====
In the United Arab Emirates, the Arab Spring saw a sudden and intense demand for democratic reforms. However, government repression of human rights, including unlawful detentions and torture, quelled the opposition and silenced dissenters. Even years after the Arab Spring uprisings, the Emirates remain in staunch opposition to free speech.

In 2011, 133 peaceful political activists—including academics and members of a social organization, Islah—signed a petition calling for democratic reforms. Submitted to the Emirati monarch rulers, the petition demanded elections, more legislative powers for the Federal National Council and an independent judiciary.

In 2012, the authorities arrested 94 of the 133 journalists, government officials, judges, lawyers, teachers and student activists, who were detained in secret detention facilities. For a year, until the trial began in March 2013, the 94 prisoners were subjected to enforced disappearances and torture. As the "unfair" trial ended on 2 July 2013, 69 men were convicted on the basis of evidence acquired through forced confessions, and received harsh prison sentences of up to 15 years.

The case came to be known as "UAE-94", following which freedom of speech was further curbed. For years, these prisoners have been under arbitrary detention, with some "held in incommunicado, and denied their rights". In July 2021, Amnesty International called the UAE authorities to immediately release 60 prisoners of the UAE-94 case, who remained detained nine years after their arrest.

At least 51 prisoners, who were part of the "UAE-94" mass trial, were being imprisoned despite completing their sentences. Some prisoners completed their sentences in March 2023, while others completed it as early as July 2019. HRW said that those the prisoners continued to remain in prison without a proper legal basis, even after completing the sentences between one month and nearly four years before.

Following the 2011 petition, the UAE authorities also arrested five prominent human rights defenders and government critics who did not sign the petition. All were pardoned the next day but have been facing a number of unfair acts of the government. One of the prominent Emirati activists, Ahmed Mansoor, reported being beaten twice since then. His passport was confiscated and nearly $140000 were stolen from his personal bank account. Most of the human rights activists have been victims of the UAE government's intimidation for years.

The authorities also exiled an activist to Thailand. He spoke out about the government.

==== Yemen (2011) ====
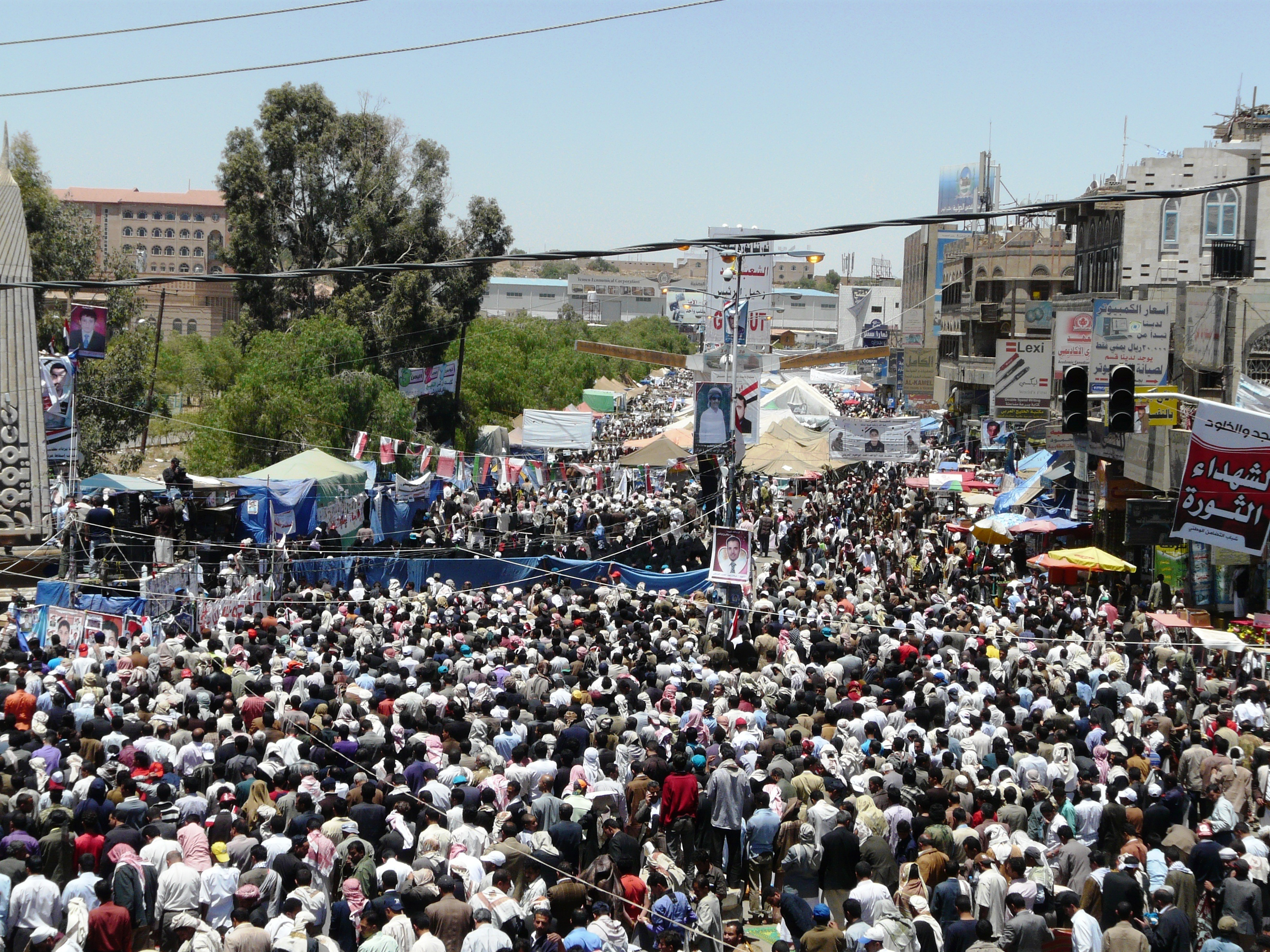
Protests in Sana'a

Protests occurred in many towns in both the north and south of Yemen starting in mid-January 2011. Demonstrators in the South mainly protested against President Saleh's support of Al Qaeda in South Yemen, the marginalization of the Southern people and the exploitation of Southern natural resources. Other parts of the country initially protested against governmental proposals to modify the constitution of Yemen, unemployment and economic conditions, and corruption, but their demands soon included a call for the resignation of President Ali Abdullah Saleh, who had been facing internal opposition from his closest advisors since 2009.

A major demonstration of over 16000 protesters took place in Sanaa on 27 January 2011, and soon thereafter human rights activist and politician Tawakkol Karman called for a "Day of Rage" on 3 February. According to Xinhua News, organizers were calling for a million protesters. In response to the planned protest, Ali Abdullah Saleh stated that he would not seek another presidential term in 2013.

On 3 February, 20000 protesters demonstrated against the government in Sana'a, others participated in a "Day of Rage" in Aden that was called for by Tawakel Karman, while soldiers, armed members of the General People's Congress, and many protestors held a pro-government rally in Sana'a. Concurrent with the resignation of Egyptian president Mubarak, Yemenis again took to the streets protesting President Saleh on 11 February, in what has been dubbed a "Friday of Rage". The protests continued in the days following despite clashes with government advocates. In a "Friday of Anger" held on 18 February, tens of thousands of Yemenis took part in anti-government demonstrations in the major cities of Sana'a, Taiz, and Aden. Protests continued over the following months, especially in the three major cities, and briefly intensified in late May into urban warfare between Hashid tribesmen and army defectors allied with the opposition on one side and security forces and militias loyal to Saleh on the other.

After Saleh pretended to accept a Gulf Cooperation Council-brokered plan allowing him to cede power in exchange for immunity from prosecution only to back away before signing three separate times, an assassination attempt on 3 June left him and several other high-ranking Yemeni officials injured by a blast in the presidential compound's mosque. Saleh was evacuated to Saudi Arabia for treatment and handed over power to Vice President Abdrabbuh Mansur Hadi, who largely continued his policies and ordered the arrest of several Yemenis in connection with the attack on the presidential compound. While in Saudi Arabia, Saleh kept hinting that he could return any time and continued to be present in the political sphere through television appearances from Riyadh starting with an address to the Yemeni people on 7 July. On 13 August, a demonstration was announced in Yemen as "Mansouron Friday" in which hundreds of thousands of Yemenis called for Saleh to go. The protesters joining the "Mansouron Friday" were calling for establishment of "a new Yemen". On 12 September Saleh issued a presidential decree while still receiving treatment in Riyadh authorizing Hadi to negotiate a deal with the opposition and sign the GCC initiative.

On 23 September, three months since the assassination attempt, Saleh returned to Yemen abruptly, defying all earlier expectations. Pressure on Saleh to sign the GCC initiative eventually led to his doing so in Riyadh on 23 November. Saleh thereby agreed to step down and set the stage for the transfer of power to his vice president. A presidential election was then held on 21 February 2012, in which Hadi (the only candidate) won 99.8% of the vote. Hadi then took the oath of office in Yemen's parliament on 25 February. By 27 February Saleh had resigned from the presidency and transferred power to Hadi. The replacement government was overthrown by Houthi rebels on 22 January 2015, starting the Yemeni Civil War and the Saudi Arabian-led intervention in Yemen.

== Outcomes ==
=== Arab Winter ===
In the aftermath of the Arab Spring in various countries, there was a wave of violence and instability commonly known as the Arab Winter or Islamist Winter. The Arab Winter was characterized by extensive civil wars, general regional instability, economic and demographic decline of the Arab League and overall religious wars between Sunni and Shia Muslims.

Areas of control in the Second Libyan Civil War (2014–2020)

Although the long-term effects of the Arab Spring have yet to be shown, its short-term consequences varied greatly across the Middle East and North Africa. In Tunisia and Egypt, where the existing regimes were ousted and replaced through a process of free and fair election, the revolutions were considered short-term successes. This interpretation is, however, problematized by the subsequent political turmoil that emerged in Egypt and the autocracy that has formed in Tunisia. Elsewhere, most notably in the monarchies of Morocco and the Persian Gulf, existing regimes co-opted the Arab Spring movement and managed to maintain order without significant social change. In other countries, particularly Syria and Libya, the apparent result of Arab Spring protests was a complete societal collapse.

Social scientists have endeavored to understand the circumstances that led to this variation in outcome. A variety of causal factors have been highlighted, most of which hinge on the relationship between the strength of the state and the strength of civil society. Countries with stronger civil society networks in various forms underwent more successful reforms during the Arab Spring; these findings are also consistent with more general social science theories such as those espoused by Robert D. Putnam and Joel S. Migdal.

One of the primary influences that have been highlighted in the analysis of the Arab Spring is the relative strength or weakness of a society's formal and informal institutions prior to the revolts. When the Arab Spring began, Tunisia had an established infrastructure and a lower level of petty corruption than did other states, such as Libya. This meant that, following the overthrow of the existing regime, there was less work to be done in reforming Tunisian institutions than elsewhere, and consequently it was less difficult to transition to and consolidate a democratic system of government.

Also crucial was the degree of state censorship over print, broadcast, and social media in different countries. Television coverage by channels like Al Jazeera and BBC News provided worldwide exposure and prevented mass violence by the Egyptian government in Tahrir Square, contributing to the success of the Egyptian Revolution. In other countries, such as Libya, Bahrain, and Syria, such international press coverage was not present to the same degree, and the governments of these countries were able to act more freely in suppressing the protests. Strong authoritarian regimes with high degrees of censorship in their national broadcast media were able to block communication and prevent the domestic spread of information necessary for successful protests.

Countries with greater access to social media, such as Tunisia and Egypt, proved more effective in mobilizing large groups of people, and appear to have been more successful overall than those with greater state control over media. Although social media played a large role in shaping the events of revolutions social activism did not occur in a vacuum. Without the use of street level organization social activists would not have been as effective. Even though a revolution did take place and the prior government has been replaced, Tunisia's government can not conclude that another uprising will not take place. There are still many grievances taking place today.

In Tunisia, due to tourism coming to a halt and other factors during the revolution and Arab Spring movement, the budget deficit has grown and unemployment has risen since 2011. According to the World Bank in 2016, "Unemployment remains at 15.3% from 16.7% in 2011, but still well above the pre-revolution level of 13%." Large scale emigration brought on by a long civil war has permanently harmed the Syrian economy. Projections for economic contraction will remain high at almost 7% in 2017.

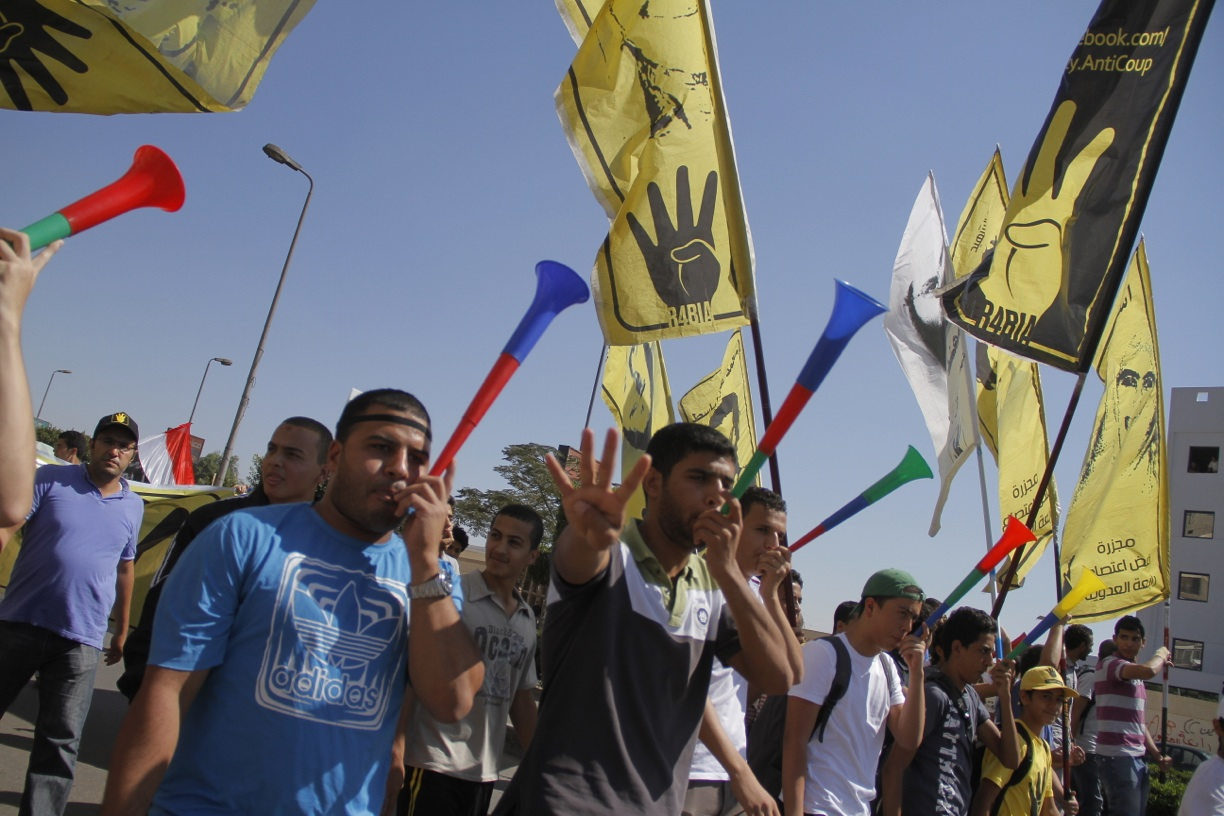
Demonstrators holding the Rabia sign in solidarity with the victims of the August 2013 Rabaa massacre of pro-Morsi sit-ins in Cairo

The support, even if tacit, of national military forces during protests has been correlated to the success of the Arab Spring movement in different countries. In Egypt and Tunisia, the military actively participated in ousting the incumbent regime and in facilitating the transition to democratic elections. Countries like Saudi Arabia, on the other hand, exhibited a strong mobilization of military force against protesters, effectively ending the revolts in their territories; others, including Libya and Syria, failed to stop the protests entirely and instead ended up in civil war. The support of the military in Arab Spring protests has also been linked to the degree of ethnic homogeneity in different societies. In Saudi Arabia and Syria, where the ruling elite was closely linked with ethnic or religious subdivisions of society, the military sided with the existing regime and took on the ostensible role of protector to minority populations.

The presence of a strong, educated middle class has been noted as a correlate to the success of the Arab Spring in different countries. Countries with strong welfare programs and a weak middle class, such as Saudi Arabia and Jordan, as well as countries with great economic disparity and an impoverished working class—including Yemen, Libya, and Morocco—did not experience successful revolutions. The strength of the middle class is, in turn, directly connected to the existing political, economic, and educational institutions in a country, and the middle class itself may be considered an informal institution. In very broad terms, this may be reframed in terms of development, as measured by various indicators such as the Human Development Index: rentier states such as the oil monarchies of the Persian Gulf exhibited less successful revolutions overall.

Charting what he calls the 'new masses' of the twenty-first century, Sociologist Göran Therborn draws attention to the historical contradictory role of the middle class. The Egyptian middle class has illustrated this ambivalence and contradiction in 2011 and 2013: "The volatility of middle-class politics is vividly illustrated by the sharp turns in Egypt, from acclamation of democracy to adulation of the military and its mounting repression of dissent, effectively condoning the restoration of the ancien régime minus Mubarak.

=== Long-term aftermath ===
==== Sectarianism and collapse of state systems ====
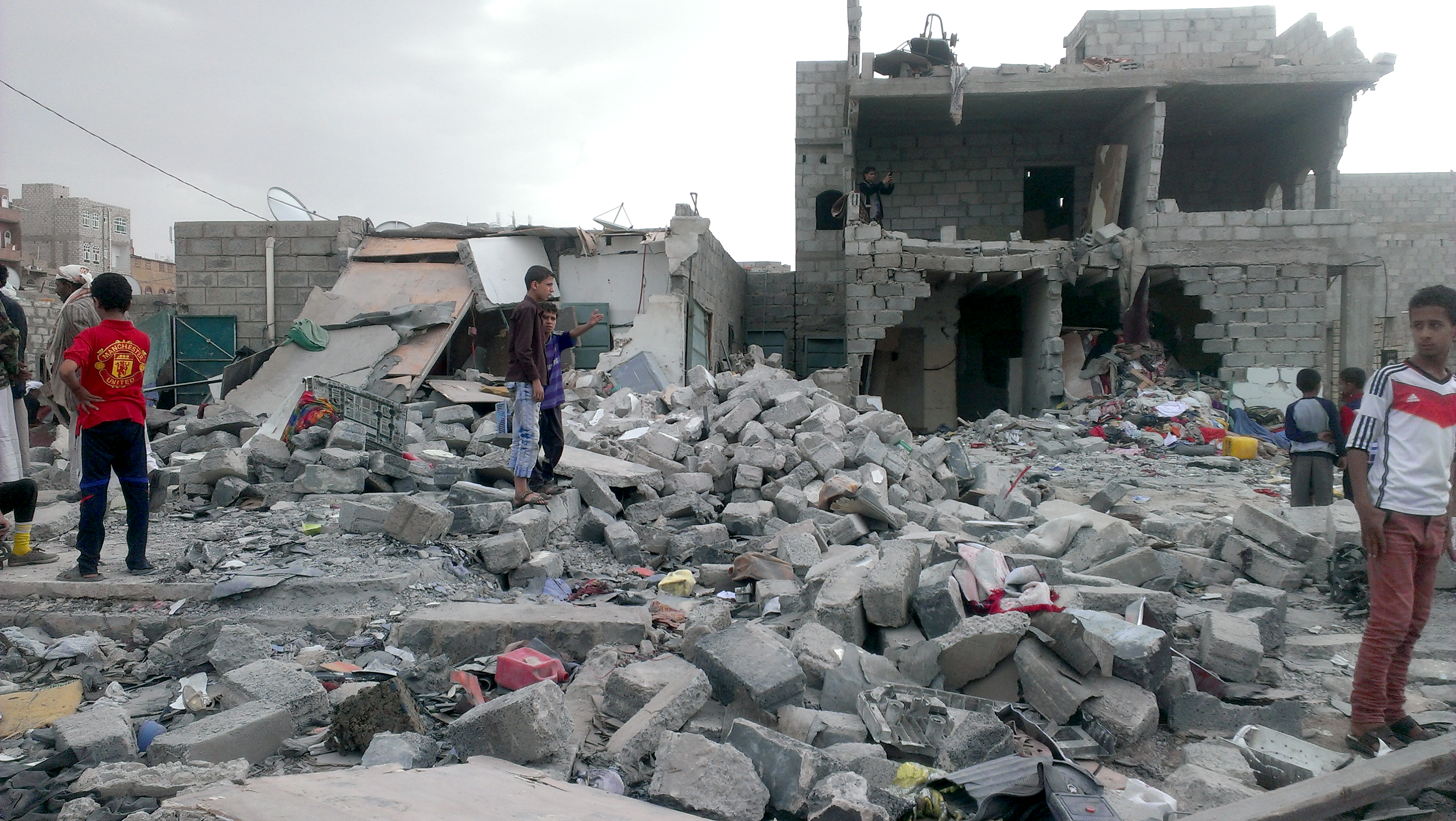
Yemeni capital Sanaa after Saudi Arabian-led airstrikes against the Shia Houthis, October 2015

Some trends in political Islam resulting from the Arab Spring noted by observers (Quinn Mecham and Tarek Osman) include:

- Repression of the Muslim Brotherhood, not only in Egypt by the military and courts following the forcible removal of Morsi from office in 2013; but also by Saudi Arabia and a number of Gulf countries (not Qatar). The ambassadors crisis also seriously threatened the GCC's activities, adversely affected its functioning and could arguably even have led to its dissolution.
- Rise of Islamist state-building where state failure has taken place—most prominently in Syria, Iraq, Libya and Yemen. Islamists have found it easier than competing non-Islamists trying to fill the void of state failure, by securing external funding, weaponry and fighters – "many of which have come from abroad and have rallied around a pan-Islamic identity". The norms of governance in these Islamist areas are militia-based, and the governed submit to their authority out of fear, loyalty, other reasons, or some combination. The "most expansive" of these new "models" is the Islamic State.
- Increasing sectarianism (primarily Sunni-Shia) at least in part from proxy wars and the escalation of the Iran–Saudi Arabia proxy conflict. Islamists are fighting Islamists across sectarian lines in Lebanon (Sunni militants targeting Hezbollah positions), Yemen (between mainstream Sunni Islamists of al-Islah and the Shiite Zaydi Houthi movement), in Iraq (Islamic State and Iraqi Shiite militias).
- Increased caution and political learning in countries such as Algeria and Jordan where Islamists have chosen not to lead a major challenge against their governments. In Yemen, al-Islah "has sought to frame its ideology in a way that will avoid charges of militancy".
- In countries where Islamists did choose to lead a major challenge and did not succeed in transforming society (particularly Egypt), a disinterest in "soul-searching" about what went wrong, in favor of "antagonism and fiery anger" and a thirst for revenge. Partisans of political Islam (although this does not include some prominent leaders such as Rached Ghannouchi but is particularly true in Egypt) see themselves as victims of an injustice whose perpetrators are not just "individual conspirators but entire social groups".

"The repercussions of the 2011 uprisings have influenced Middle Eastern youth's experiences providing impetus for questioning perennial sacred beliefs and positions, and forging ahead avant-garde views and responses to the constraints they face."

Contrary to the common discourse, Hussein Agha and Robert Malley from The New Yorker argue that the divide in the post–Arab Spring in the Middle East is not sectarianism:

The bloodiest, most vicious, and most pertinent struggles occur squarely inside the Sunni world. Sectarianism is a politically expedient fable, conveniently used to cover up old-fashioned power struggles, maltreatment of minorities, and cruel totalitarian practices.

Agha and Malley point out that even in Syria there has been a misrepresentation of the conflict, that the Assad regime relied on an alliance that included middle class Sunnis along with other religious minorities. Prior to the uprising, the Syrian regime enjoyed some financial and political support from Sunni Gulf states. The "select rich urban bourgeoisie, the Sunni Damascene in particular", according to Tokyo University researcher Housam Darwisheh, "now has a direct interest in preserving stability and their relations with the regime as long as their businesses prosper." In the view of the Arab sociologist Halim Barakat, "the persistence of communal cleavages complicates rather than nullifies social class consciousness and struggles."

==== Second Arab Spring (Arab Summer) ====
The alternative names "second Arab Spring", "new Arab Spring" and "Arab Summer" refer to a similarity with the preceding Arab Spring wave of pro-democracy protests which took place in the early 2010s. However, in this wave of protests "the similarities and differences suggest more an upgrading than a replay of the Arab Spring." The wider call for democracy and human rights was replaced by more day-to-day demands, on issues including excessive costs of living and high unemployment rates.

== Revolution or reform ==
Very few analysts of the Arab societies foresaw a mass movement on such a scale that might threaten the existing order. In his 1993 sociological study of the Arab societies, culture and state, Barakat stated confidently that "one should expect the first Arab popular revolution to take place in Egypt or Tunisia. This does not, however, exclude the possibility that revolutions may occur in more pluralistic societies as well." What was prevalent, according to the Syrian writer and political dissident Yassin al-Haj Saleh was three 'springs' that ensured the status quo. One of which was a "spring of despotic states that receive assistance and legitimacy from a world system centered around stability". Most democracy protests do not result in reforms.

Two months into the Tunisian and Egyptian uprisings, The Economist magazine in a leader article spoke about a new generation of young people, idealists, "inspired by democracy", which made revolutions. Those revolutions, the article stated, "are going the right way, with a hopeful new mood prevailing and free elections in the offing". For those on the streets of Egypt the predominant slogan was "bread, freedom and social justice".

Some observers, however, have questioned the revolutionary nature of the 'Arab Spring'. A social theorist specialising in social movements and social change in the Middle East, Asef Bayat, has provided an analysis based on his decades of research as "a participant-observer", in his words. In his appraisal of the Arab revolutions, Bayat discerns a remarkable difference between these revolutions and the revolutions of the 1960s and 1970s in countries like Yemen, Nicaragua and Iran. The Arab revolutions, argues Bayat, "lacked any associated intellectual anchor" and the predominant voices, "secular and Islamists alike, took free market, property relations, and neoliberal rationality for granted" and uncritically. New social movements' define themselves as horizontal networks with aversion to the state and central authority. Thus their "political objective is not to capture the state", a fundamental feature in the twentieth-century revolutionary movements. Instead of revolution or reform, Bayat speaks of 'refolution'.

Wael Ghonim, an Internet activist who would later gain international fame, acknowledged that what he had intended by founding a Facebook page was a "simple reaction to the events in Tunisia" and that "there was no master plans or strategies" a priori. That the objective was reform to be achieved through peaceful means and not revolution was explicitly put forward by April 6 Movement, one of the leading forces of the Egyptian uprising, in their statements. It called for "coalition and co-operation between all factions and national forces to reach the reform and the peaceful change of the conditions of Egypt". "Even in Tahrir Square with so many people and the rising level of demands," recalls an activist in the movement, "we were very surprised by the people wanting the downfall of the regime; and not a single one of us had expected this." In comparing the uprisings in Tunisia, Egypt, Libya and Syria, researcher Housam Darwisheh concludes: "The Egyptian uprising, in neither dismantling the ancien regime nor creating new institutional mechanisms to lead the transition, permitted the so-called 'deep state' to reassert itself while the deepening polarization led many non-Islamists to side with the military against the MB [the Muslim Brotherhood]."

According to Cambridge sociologist Hazem Kandil, the Muslim Brotherhood did not aim at taking power during the events leading up to the toppling of Mubarak. The biggest and most organised organisation in Egypt in fact negotiated with the regime in "infamous talks between Morsi and the then vice-president Omar Suleiman", and "an informal deal was reached: withdraw your members from Tahrir Square, and we allow you to form a political party." Then the Brotherhood wavered whether to file a presidential candidate and did not push for a new constitution, choosing to work with the Supreme Council of the Armed Forces (SCAF):

The Brotherhood and the Salafists went all-out to keep the existing constitution—originating under Sadat—with a few amendments. The result was irrelevant, because the military scrapped the old constitution anyway. But the Brothers managed to persuade over 70 per cent of the voters, so it became clear to the military that they had far more sway on the street than the secular revolutionaries who had brought down Mubarak, yet seemed incapable of much organization once they had done so. For SCAF, the priority was to bring the street under control, so it decided to start working with the Brotherhood to stabilize the country.

George Lawson from the London School of Economics places the Arab uprisings within the post-Cold War world. He characterises the uprisings as "largely unsuccessful revolution" and that they "bare a family resemblance to the 'negotiated revolutions'... Negotiated revolutions ... seek to transform political and symbolic fields of action, but without a concomitant commitment to a program of economic transformation." In this 'negotiated revolution', comments Bayat, "revolutionaries had in effect little part in the 'negotiations'." What has been treated by some analysts as intellectual weakness of the revolutionary movement is partly due to the pre-2011 stifling cultural environment under repressive regimes. Although Egyptian intellectuals enjoyed a bigger margin of freedom than their counterparts in Tunisia, cultural figures sought protection from political players, and instead of leading criticism, they complied.

The post-Cold War era saw the emergence of the idea and practice of gradual reform and liberal agenda. It saw an influx of humanitarian projects, NGOs and charity work, liberal think tanks and emphasis on civil society work. This new juncture seemed to have made the idea and prospect of revolution an outdated project. The focus instead shifted to individual freedoms and free market. The new idea of civil society was different from the kind of civil society Antonio Gramsci, for instance, envisaged: 'a revolution before the revolution'.

In her field study in Yemen, anthropologist Bogumila Hall depicts the effects of what she terms as "the marketization of civil society and its heavy reliance on donors", which "led to a largely depoliticized form of activism that by passed, rather than confronted, the state". Hall, with her focus on the muhammashīn (the marginalized) in Yemen, described how in the 1990s and 2000s international NGOs established charity projects and workshops "to teach slum dwellers new skills and behaviours". But, besides the "modest changes" brought by the NGOs, concludes Hall, "delegating the problem of the muhammashīn to the realm of development and poverty alleviation, without addressing the structural causes underlying their marginalisation, had a depoliticising effect. It led to a widely held assumption, also shared by the muhammashīn, that ending marginalisation was a matter for experts and administrative measures, not politics."

When Arab regimes viewed NGOs' leaders and other similar organisations with suspicion, accusing Western governments of providing funding and training to 'illegal organisations' and fomenting revolution, diplomatic cables reported "how American officials frequently assured skeptical governments that the training was aimed at reform, not promoting revolutions". And when the Egyptian uprising was gaining its momentum, the American president Barack Obama "did not suggest that the 82-year-old leader step aside or transfer power... the argument was that he really needed to do the reforms, and do them fast. Former ambassador to Egypt (Frank G.) Wisner publicly suggested that Mr. Mubarak had to be at the center of any change, and Secretary of State Hillary Rodham Clinton warned that any transition would take time." Some activists, who read the American thinker and nonviolence advocate Gene Sharp, obtained training from foreign bodies, including the Serbian opposition movement Otpor!, and April 6 Movement modelled its logo after Otpor's. Otpor, writes Bayat in his discussion of the agencies of the Arab Spring activism in Tunisia and Egypt, obtained funds from well-known American organisations such as the American National Endowment for Democracy, USAID, and the International Republican Institute. Thus Otpur, in line with these organisations' advocacies, "pushed for political reform through nonradical, electoral, and market-driven language and practices".

Early 2019 witnessed two uprisings: one in Algeria and another in Sudan. In Algeria under pressure of weeks of protests, the head of the army forced the ailing twenty-year-serving president, Abdelaziz Bouteflika, to abdicate. In Sudan, after four months of protests, the Sudani defense minister ousted longtime President Omar al-Bashir in a coup. Writing about what he calls "a rebirth of Tahrir Square", the prominent Lebanese novelist and critic Elias Khoury, averred that "perhaps the secret of the Arab Spring lies not in its victories or defeats, but in its ability to liberate people from fear." Despite the "faded spirit of Tahrir Square" and an outcome that Khoury describes as a "monarchy that abrogates legal standards", a renaissance of resistance is unstoppable:

The defeat of the Arab Spring has seemed likely to extinguish this glimmer of hope, to return the Arab world to the tyrannical duopoly of military and oil and to crush the will of the people in the struggle between Sunni and Shia, between Saudi Arabia and Iran. The combination has thrown the region into Israel's lap. But the defeat cannot and will not stop the renaissance. If the Arab world has reached rock bottom, it can't go any lower and it can't last forever.

There was a need, suggested Khoury, to turn "the uprisings of the Arab Spring into an intellectual, political and moral project that gives meaning to the goals of freedom, democracy and social justice". From the outset the 2011 Arab uprisings raised the banner of 'social justice'. The concept, what it means and how to achieve it has been a major subject of discussion and contention since then.

=== Social justice ===
In its economic and social manifesto, the Tunisian Ennahda Movement states that the movement "adopts the social and solidarised market economy within a national approach based on free economic activity, freedom of ownership, production and administration on the one hand, and social justice and equal opportunities on the other hand" and that "national capital has to be the axis in the development process." The Muslim Brotherhood in Egypt mainly focuses on "reform of existing political systems in the Arab world. It embraces the idea of political activism and social responsibility, organising charitable works and social support programmes as part of its outreach to its core support base of lower-income populations."

On its part the International Centre for Transitional Justice has set nine 'concrete and tangible' goals with focus on "accountability for serious violations of human rights, access to justice, facilitating peace processes, advancing the cause of reconciliation and reforming the state and social institutions". One of those goals was taken up by Truth and Dignity Commission (Tunisia) that recorded and submitted to the relevant court the human rights abuses which had been committed by the Tunisian regime. A new climate of freedom of speech, freedom of organisation and elections characterised the political environment of post-Ben Ali Tunisia.

Some observers and social analysts remarked, however, that the issue of social justice remained a rhetoric or was marginalised. According to Fathi Al-Shamikhi, an expert in debt issues and founder of the Tunisian association RAID, different social forces played a crucial role in matters related to social demands and achieving social justice. "This role varies between those who advocate these demands and those who reject them, according to the social nature of each of these forces." "Bread, freedom and social justice" were the main slogans of the Arab revolutions. But although social and economic demands were raised, argued researcher and former editor in chief of the Egyptian Al-Shorouq Newspaper, Wael Gamal, "they were pushed aside in the political arena, and more attention was given to issues such as the transfer of power arrangements, the constitution first, the elections first, democratic transformation and the religious-secular conflict."

=== Counter-revolution and civil wars ===
With the survival of the regime in Egypt and the rolling back of what was gained in the short period after the overthrow of Mubarak, the persistence, or even the worsening, of the socio-economic conditions that led to the Tunisian uprising, a Saudi-led intervention in Bahrain assisted the defeat of the uprising in the country, and especially the descent of other uprisings into brutal civil wars in Syria, Libya and Yemen, with acute humanitarian crises, there are:

many in capitals around the world who find it convenient to insist that a strongman is needed to deal with the peoples of this region. It is a racist, bigoted argument and should be called out as such, but many political leaders of the region are quite comfortable promoting it. Indeed, many of the counterrevolutionary moves in the region happened precisely because they agree with that argument.

In April 2019, amidst an offensive to take Libya's capital city of Tripoli by military leader Khalifa Haftar, for whom U.S. President Donald Trump had voiced his support, the Syrian policy scholar Marwan Kabalan argued in an opinion piece for Al Jazeera that "counter-revolutionary forces are seeking to resurrect the military dictatorship model the Arab Spring dismantled." Kabalan contended that "regional and world powers have sponsored the return of military dictatorships to the region, with the hope that they would clean up the Arab Spring 'mess' and restore order." He also referred to Western powers' history of backing military rule in the region, and how American interests in the Middle East clashed with French and British ones. He cited the U.S.-supported coups in Syria and Egypt, but generally how, as former U.S. Secretary of State Condoleezza Rice admitted, the United States "pursued stability at the expense of democracy... and achieved neither." Kabalan concluded:

There seems to be a concerted effort to establish a crescent of military-ruled countries from Sudan in northeast Africa to Algeria in the northwest through Egypt and Libya to ward off popular upheaval and keep "Islamist" forces in check.

Analyst H. A. Hellyer attributes the persistence of autocracy and dictatorship, as well as counter-revolution, to structures that go back to colonialism – and also to the forms that states in the MENA region took in the postcolonial era and the social pacts established in the process. What we are seeing since 2011, Hellyer says, is a clash between those "inherited structures" and the new "demographic realities" of the populations in the region.

Compromise and dialogue with the entrenched regimes, followed by elections in Tunisia and Egypt, have produced either limited change or counter-revolution. In the first quarter of 2019, protests and mass mobilisation in Sudan and Algeria succeeded in toppling the heads of state, but, as scholar and Woodrow Wilson Center fellow Marina Ottaway states, there is a dilemma: The demands of the genuine grassroots movements are unlikely "to be attained through a peaceful process – one without violence and the violation of the human rights of many." Ottaway points to the experiences of Algeria and Egypt; in the former, the regime annulled the results of the elections in the early 1990s, and in the latter, the military carried out a bloody repression of the Muslim Brotherhood government after the Brotherhood's own short-lived presidency was removed from office:

Attempts to bring about radical changes, by punishing and excluding a large part of the old elite, are not possible by democratic means, because such efforts elicit a strong reaction – a counterrevolution – leading to violence and repression.

== By country ==
- Algeria: 2010–2012 Algerian protests
- Bahrain: 2011 Bahraini uprising
- Djibouti: 2011 Djiboutian protests
- Egypt: Egyptian Crisis (2011–2014)
- Iraq: 2011 Iraqi protests and 2012–2013 Iraqi protests
- Jordan: 2011–2012 Jordanian protests
- Kuwait: Kuwaiti protests (2011–2012)
- Lebanon: 2011 Lebanese protests
- Libya: 2011 Libyan civil war
- Mauritania: 2011–2012 Mauritanian protests
- Morocco: 2011–2012 Moroccan protests
- Oman: 2011 Omani protests
- Palestine: 2011-2012 Palestinian protests
- Saudi Arabia: 2011–2012 Saudi Arabian protests
- Sudan: 2011–2013 Sudanese protests
- Syria: Syrian revolution (2011–2024)
- Tunisia: Jasmine revolution (2010–2011)
- Yemen: Yemeni crisis

== See also ==
- Arab Cold War
- Activism
- Arab nationalism
- Arab Renaissance
- Arab Revolt
- Arab Summer
- Arab Winter
- Arts of the Arab Spring
- Asian Spring
- Democracy in the Middle East and North Africa
- Islam and democracy
- Islamic liberalism
- List of current monarchs of the Arabian Peninsula
- List of modern conflicts in North Africa
- List of modern conflicts in the Middle East
- Revolutions of 1830
- Revolutions of 1989
- We Want to Live movement
- April 6 Youth Movement
- Justice Call
- 2025 Gaza Strip anti-Hamas protests
- 2025 Iranian protests
- Decolonisation of Africa
- Decolonisation of Asia
