= 2025 Gaza Strip anti-Hamas protests =

2025 Gaza Strip protests
- Part of the Gaza war protests in the Gaza Strip
- Date: 25 March – 22 August 2025 (4 months and 4 weeks)
- Location: Gaza Strip
- Caused by: War-weariness from the Gaza war and Gaza genocide
- Goals: An end to the Gaza war; Hamas relinquishing power in the Gaza Strip; Preventing Palestinian displacement by Israel
- Methods: Protests, civilian uprising
- Result: Protests ended/extinguished by August 2025

Parties
Anti-war and anti-Hamas protesters; Local mukhtars	(Palestine) Hamas government in Gaza; Al-Qassam Brigades; Gaza Strip Interior and National Security Ministry; Palestinian Civil Police Force; Arrow Unit; Palestinian Security Services; Rad'a Force; (Palestine) Pro-Hamas government in Gaza counter-protesters

Number
Variously reported to be hundreds or thousands of protestors	20,000 fighters; Unknown policemen; Unknown numbers of counter-protesters

Casualties and losses
6+ executed Unknown number injured or detained	1 policeman killed

Between March and August 2025, protests took place across the Gaza Strip against Hamas, which has held exclusive control over the territory since 2007. Demonstrators called on Hamas to give up its rule and bring an end to the war with Israel. Many of the protests against Hamas were part of wider protests against the Gaza war. The protests appeared to have been sparked by widespread local war exhaustion and dissatisfaction with the leadership style and tactics of Hamas following Israel's resumption of the Gaza war earlier in March. Several days after the protests began, the Israeli media outlet Ynet reported that Hamas executed six Gazans and publicly flogged or kidnapped others who had taken part in the demonstrations; some of them remain missing.

These marked the biggest protests against Hamas to take place in Gaza since the October 7 attacks. Anti-Hamas protests in the territory had previously taken place in summer 2023, 2019, and from 2011 to 2012.

== Background ==
=== Humanitarian crisis and attitudes towards Hamas ===
Under Hamas' government and the Israeli blockade, living conditions in the Gaza Strip have been poor, with Hamas accused by various sources of human rights abuses against Palestinian civilians. Several months before the outbreak of war, large-scale anti-Hamas protests broke out in Gaza over economic conditions, which were met with arrests by police. Since the October 7 attacks and subsequent onset of the Gaza war, conditions have worsened, with Gaza Palestinians experiencing a severe humanitarian crisis and the tightening of the Israeli blockade. Major problems include an ongoing electricity crisis and famine.

Opinion polling in the Gaza Strip conducted by the Palestinian Center for Policy and Survey Research (PSR) showed approval rates of Hamas dropping from 52% who expressed satisfaction with Hamas in December 2023 to 43% in May 2025. According to a survey conducted in Gaza by Gallup International in early March 2025, more than half of Gazans would leave the Strip if given the opportunity. The survey also found that the main issues troubling residents include chronic shortages of electricity, fuel, water, and food, as well as a general sense of insecurity in the region.

=== Collapse of January-March 2025 ceasefire ===
A ceasefire between Israel and Hamas took place from 19 January 2025 to 18 March 2025. After it was implemented, the Israel Defense Forces (IDF) withdrew from nearly all of the Gaza Strip, and fighting paused for around two months. On the night of 18 March, Israel ended the ceasefire by launching a surprise attack on Gaza, stating that their airstrikes targeted senior Hamas officials. According to Palestinian sources, the strikes resulted in over 500 fatalities.

The protests began a day after Palestinian Islamic Jihad, a Hamas-allied militant group, fired rockets toward Israel. Israel then ordered a large portion of Beit Lahia's residents to evacuate, sparking significant anger among the local population.

== Protests ==
CNN estimated that "thousands" protested in Beit Lahiya, and AP estimated around 3,000. A Middle East expert stated that he would not "be surprised if there were 10,000 in total" protesters across the different protests. The protestors chanted slogans such as "we want an end to the war" and "we want to live", as well as "Hamas out" and "Hamas are terrorists." Protesters held signs and banners with phrases such as "enough of displacement" and "stop the war", as well as "Hamas does not represent us." BBC reported that in Gaza, protesters told Hamas fighters to steer clear of schools and hospitals.

=== 25 March ===
==== Beit Lahia ====
In the northern city of Beit Lahia, where public anger erupted after Israel demanded the city's evacuation as it resumed military operations in the area, hundreds to thousands of people, mostly men, marched in the streets, waving white flags and chanting “Hamas out” and “Hamas terrorists”; some protesters held banners reading “Stop the war” and “We want to live in peace”, and some were chanting slogans against the Muslim Brotherhood. (Note: Hamas originated in 1987 as a branch of the Muslim Brotherhood.) According to The Jerusalem Post, some protesters called for the release of the remaining prisoners still alive– possibly referring to the Israeli hostages held by Hamas. Footage additionally showed protesters chanting anti-Muslim Brotherhood slogans. Masked militants of the Al-Qassam Brigades, Hamas' armed wing, who were armed or were carrying batons, dispersed and assaulted protesters.

The protests took place primarily outside the Indonesian Hospital. According to The Jerusalem Post, one demonstrator called on Al Jazeera correspondent Anas al-Sharif to come out of the hospital and report on what was happening– implicitly referring to the network's unwillingness to criticize Hamas.

==== Jabalia ====
A second demonstration took place later in the day in the Jabalia refugee camp, where protestors burned tires and demanded an end to the war, chanting "We want to eat".

==== Khan Yunis ====
Following news of the protests, additional demonstrations began to emerge in Khan Yunis, where protesters were seen chanting for an end to the war and shouting, “Down with Hamas”.

As of the evening of 25 March, Telegram messages from unknown sources were calling on people to reprise the demonstrations in various parts of the Gaza Strip the next day.

=== 26 March ===
The anti-Hamas protests across the Gaza Strip continued on 26 March. The Times of Israel reported that "thousands" of Palestinians rallied in northern Gaza.

==== Beit Lahia ====
On the second day of protests, hundreds (or thousands) of demonstrators gathered in Beit Lahia, continuing to chant slogans such as “Hamas out! Hamas is terrorism!” and “We want to live freely".

==== Gaza City ====
A relatively small protest also took place in Gaza City, where demonstrators likewise chanted slogans against Hamas. In the Shijaiyah neighborhood of Gaza City, dozens of protesters were seen chanting, “Out, out, out! Hamas, get out!”. In eastern Gaza City, NBC News captured on camera a crowd chanting "Leave us Hamas. We want to live freely."

==== Deir al-Balah ====
For the first time since the protests began, a demonstration took place in Deir al-Balah, where, according to one participant, around 300 protesters were present.

=== 27 March ===
Protests continued on 27 March in the northern part of the Gaza Strip, particularly in Jabaliya and Beit Lahia, as well as spreading to other cities such as Gaza City and Khan Younis. In Jabaliya, protestors were seen shouting the names of senior Hamas officials and chanting "Shame, shame, the cause of the destruction," and "The earth is shaking," as well as carrying signs which said "We won't be pawns," "We want to live," and "Hamas out."

=== 2 April ===
A mass protest was held in Beit Lahia, demanding removal of Hamas rule and an end of war.

=== 6 April ===
Dozens of Gazans protested against Hamas in Jabalia, chanting slogans such as "Hamas are terrorists" and "Hamas are garbage".

=== 16 April ===
A protest against war and Hamas was held in Beit Lahia.

=== 27 April ===
Dozens of protestors participated in a protest against war and Hamas rule in Beit Lahia. Hamas reportedly intimidated journalists who attempted to report on the protest.

=== 19 May ===
Hundreds of protestors protested against war and Hamas in Khan Yunis.

=== 21 May ===
Protests continued in Khan Yunis calling for Hamas's removal and an end to the war.

=== 21 July ===
Several dozens of protestors participated in a protest against Hamas and in support of truce in Khan Yunis.

=== 22 August ===
In August 2025, hundreds of Palestinians in Gaza City staged rallies, calling for an end of the war and halting Israel's invasion of the city.

== Reprisals ==
=== 29 March ===
On 29 March, the family of 22-year-old Oday Nasser Al Rabay (Rabie), who participated in the protests, said that he was kidnapped, tortured, and killed by Hamas militants. Some reports said that his body had been dragged through the streets before it was returned to his family’s home. Thousands of people attended his funeral, shouting "In spirit and blood we'll redeem you, Odai!", "Allahu akbar", and "Out, out, out! Hamas out!". Rabie’s brother said Rabie was wearing only his underwear with a rope around his neck when he was returned. Rabie’s brother brought him to a hospital where he died.

=== 13 April ===
An eyewitness said that on 13 April, Hamas gunmen attempted to force entry into the residence of the elderly Jamal al-Maznan. Hamas wanted to launch rockets and projectiles from the elderly man’s home. The elderly man refused. Neighbors and relatives defended the elderly man. Hamas opened fire and injured a number of people, but the civilians were able to push the Hamas gunmen out. The witness said the protesters were not afraid of the bullets and told the gunmen to leave: "We don't want you in this place. We don't want your weapons that have brought us destruction, devastation, and death."

== Analysis ==
On 28 March, Deutsche Welle published a fact checking article stating, "it's difficult to state with certainty that the protests in Gaza this week were exclusively aimed against Hamas, nor can they be said to represent a general uprising against the group. Rather they reflect a broad range of opinions held among Palestinians in Gaza, including some explicitly anti-Hamas voices".

== Reactions ==
=== Hamas ===
Senior Hamas official Basem Naim commented on the protests stating that "demonstrations are to be expected from people, facing extermination, against war and destruction" and that the people had the right to protest, but that their focus should be on the "criminal aggressor, which is the occupation and its army". The Times of Israel also noted on 26 March of the lack of direct intervention, attributing to Hamas maintaining a lower profile since Israel resumed its military operations. Even so, there are reports suggesting that Hamas operatives abducted, tortured, and killed a Gazan who had taken part in the protests. Additional reports indicate that Hamas responded harshly to the Gazans who protested against them: Hamas publicly flogged some of the demonstrators, kidnapped several others (some of them remain missing), and executed five more Gazans in addition to Oday Nasser Al Rabay.

On September 25, 2025, during an interview with CNN, Senior Hamas official Ghazi Hamad was shown videos of Gazans protesting against Hamas, urging Hamas to give up power and criticizing the Hamas leadership, which was said to be residing in hotels while the people of Gaza suffered. Hamad refused to watch the video for more than a few seconds and stated that he knew Gazans were suffering, but he blamed Israel for their disgruntlement.

=== Palestinians ===
Gazans in favor of Hamas reacted negatively to the protests, downplaying them and accusing participants of being traitors. Some protesters in Jabaliya reportedly regretted participating, feeling that pro-Israel media only emphasized the protests as "anti-Hamas." These protestors stated that during the protests, they had chanted against not only Hamas, but also Israel, the Palestinian Authority, and the Arab mediators of the conflict. One protester in Jabaliya said that there were scuffles between pro-Hamas supporters and opponents of Hamas in the protest. Another protester in Jabaliya said they were scared of retribution for participating in the protests.

Reportedly, the Gazan Christian community refused to participate in the protests, instead prioritizing sheltering from Israeli bombings.

=== Israel ===
Israeli Defense Minister Israel Katz called on Palestinians to join the protests and "demand the removal of Hamas from Gaza and the immediate release of all Israeli hostages."

=== Reporters Without Borders ===
Reporters Without Borders released a statement condemning Hamas for threatening journalists that were covering the anti-Hamas protests or posting negative social media posts about Hamas. At least three journalists received threats, and at least two of them reported facing physical attacks.

== See also ==
- Criticism of Hamas
- Israeli hostage deal protests
- Fatah–Hamas conflict
