= War-weariness =

Public disapproval of prolonged war

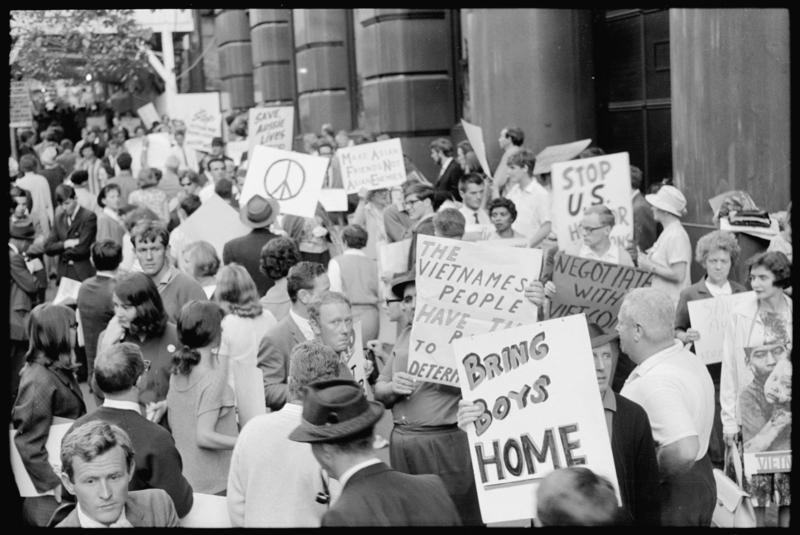
Anti-Vietnam War demonstration at Phillip Street Court in Sydney, Australia, 1968

War-weariness is the public or political disapproval of the continuation of a prolonged conflict or war. The causes normally involve the intensity of casualties—financial, civilian, and military. It also occurs when a belligerent has the ability to leave the conflict easily but continues to stay. War-weariness normally leads to a distrust in government or military leadership and can spark protest and anti-war movements. It can also be fueled when a belligerent is found guilty of war crimes, which can create domestic and international backlash. Rates of enlistment and the morale of the armed forces are often affected by war-weariness.

It is relevant for war initiation but less so for war involvement.

In The Causes of War, Australian historian Geoffrey Blainey argues, "If war-weariness was one of the spokes in Mr. Neville Chamberlain's umbrella of appeasement, and if it was one of the Anglo-French attitudes which fed Hitler's confidence, it cannot be called a peaceful influence". Even so, Blainey concludes, "War-weariness in a nation often promotes peace and war-fever promotes war, but there have been notable instances where war-weariness promoted war".

War-weariness is less likely to appear in military dictatorships, especially those with heavy propaganda and censorship. According to Immanuel Kant, democratic nations have a better chance of having unpopular news of the war reach the masses, which increases their chance and level of war-weariness.

== Historical examples ==
- Opposition to World War I
  - 1917 French Army mutinies
  - Kiel mutiny and German revolution of 1918–1919
- Opposition to World War II
  - German resistance to Nazism
  - Japanese People's Anti-war Alliance
  - Mutinies during WWII
- Russian Civil War
  - Kronstadt rebellion
- Cold War
  - Opposition to the Vietnam War
- War on terror
  - Opposition to the Iraq War
  - Opposition to the War in Afghanistan (2001–2021)
