= 2023 Gaza economic protests =

Economic and anti-Hamas protests in the Gaza Strip

2023 Gaza economic and anti-Hamas protests
- Part of Economic effects of the Gaza-Israel and Israel-Palestine conflicts and of the Battle of Gaza during the Fatah–Hamas conflict
- Map of the Gaza Strip
- Date: 30 July 2023 – 7 August 2023 (1 week and 1 day)
- Location: Gaza Strip
- Caused by: Opposition to Hamas regime and corruption in the Gaza Strip; Electricity outages
- Goals: Reducing cost of living; Opposing the Hamas government
- Result: Hamas internal security cracks down on protesters

Parties
Protesters: (Palestine) Palestinian protesters, organized by grassroots movement "Alvirus Alsakher"	Government: (Palestine) Hamas government in Gaza

Lead figures
Unknown	Ismail Haniyeh

Casualties
- Deaths: 1+
- Injuries: Dozens
- Arrested: Dozens

In July and August 2023, thousands of Palestinians in the Gaza Strip took to the streets to protest chronic power outages, poor economic conditions in the territory, and Hamas's taxation of stipends to the poor paid by Qatar. The rallies, organized by a grassroots online movement called "Alvirus Alsakher" (The mocking virus). Journalists reported that the protesters numbered "several thousand", and some also burned Hamas flags. Mass protests against Hamas are not common in the Gaza Strip. Previous mass protests against Hamas include the 2019 Gaza economic protests and the 2011–2012 Palestinian protests.

== Background ==
In March 2019, protestors in Gaza demonstrated against Hamas and poor economic conditions during the 2019 Gaza economic protests.

Immediate causes for the outbreak of protests were several. During a July heat wave, Gaza experienced a surge of power outages, with residents receiving 5 hours of electricity per day. In addition, there was public anger over authorities demolishing a building addition in southern Gaza, killing the owner.

== Protests ==
Marches were first held in Gaza City and Khan Yunis on 30 July. Police destroyed mobile phones of protestors filming in Khan Yunis. Supporters of Hamas and protestors threw stones at each other, and there were several arrests. During the following week, hundreds of Gazans marched through neighborhoods at separate rallies in Gaza City, Nuseirat, Khan Yunis, the Jabaliya refugee camp, Rafah, Bani Suheila and Shujaiya. Among the slogans chanted was Ash-shab yurid isqat an-nizam (lit. 'the people want to bring down the regime'). According to Al-Monitor, protestors claimed that "[Hamas’] leaders ruined Gaza beyond hope and turned it into a place of misery, and yet they live luxurious lifestyles."

Protestors subsequently attempted to hold protests on 4 August, but were prevented by police. Police also attacked and detained journalists attempting to cover the protests, including in Jabalia refugee camp. The attack was condemned by the Palestinian Journalists Syndicate.

Hamas internal security prevented additional protests on 7 August, as a heavy police presence deterred protestors from gathering. At least one protestor was killed by security forces and dozens were injured.

== Hamas response ==
Hamas authorities launched an arrest campaign after the outbreak of protests, including raiding the Mohammed Yousef El-Najar Hospital to arrest injured protestors.

In response, Hamas blamed the blockade of Gaza for the poor economic conditions and claimed that the protests were organized by collaborators with Israel. But Gazan protestors blamed Hamas for poor governance and expressed angers that Hamas leaders such as Ismail Haniyeh lived outside Gaza.

== See also ==
- 2018–2019 Gaza border protests
- Arab Spring
- 2019 Gaza economic protests
- 2011–2012 Palestinian protests
