= Arab Revolt (disambiguation) =

The Arab Revolt was a 1916–1918 revolt led by Sharif Hussein bin Ali against Ottoman rule.

The term may also refer to:

- Syrian peasant revolt (1834–1835)
  - Peasants' revolt in Palestine
  - Alawite revolt (1834–1835)
- Iraqi revolt against the British, 1920
- Great Syrian Revolt, 1925–1927
- 1936–1939 Arab revolt in Palestine
- Arab insurgency in Khuzestan
  - 1979 Khuzestan insurgency
- Arab Spring, 2010–2012
- Arab Winter, 2012–2019
- 2018–2024 Arab protests

== See also ==
- Alawite Revolt (disambiguation)
