= Le Phare de la Loire =

French regional daily newspaper, 1852–1944

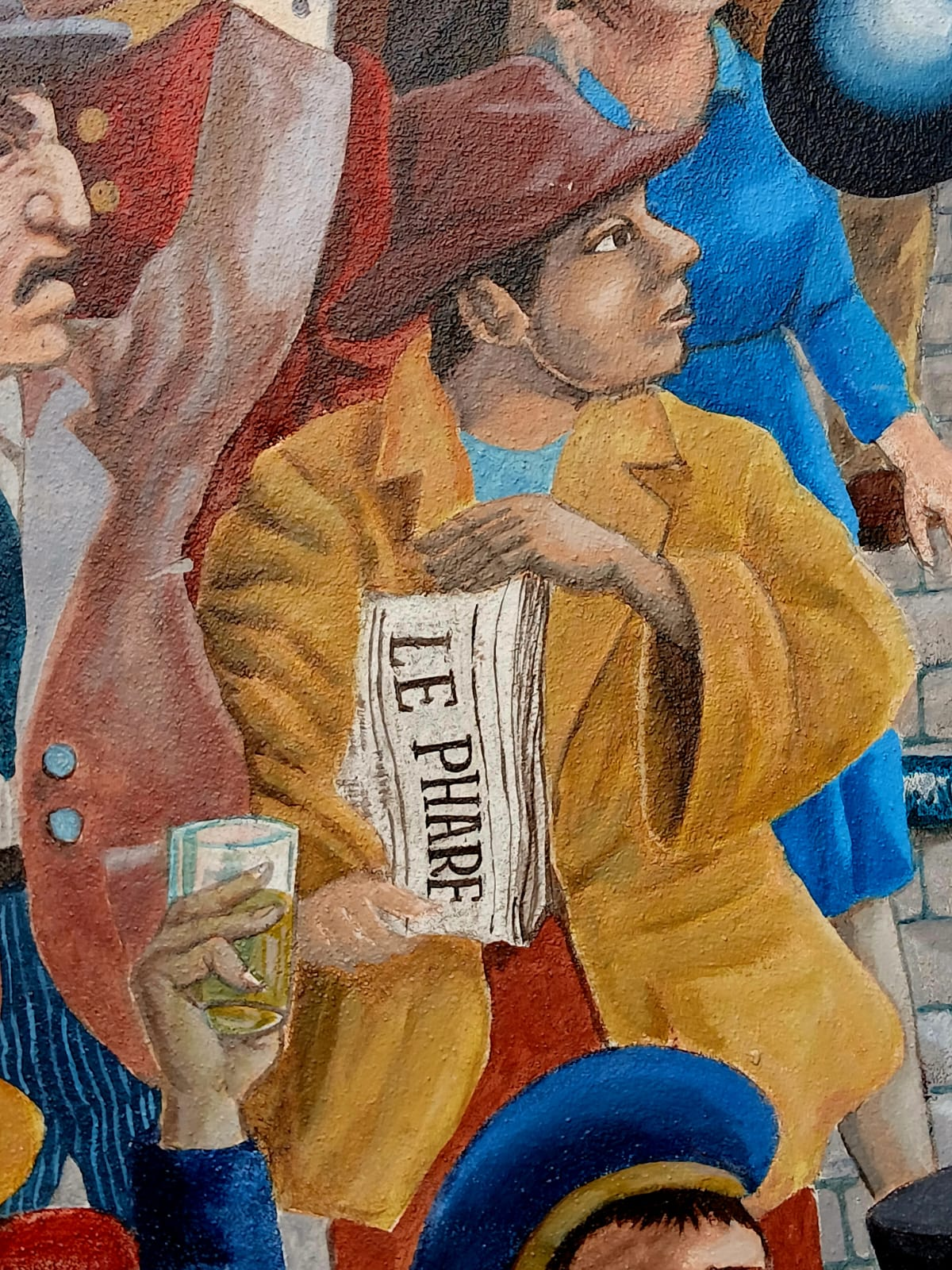
- Le Phare de la Loire depicted on The Wall Fallen from the Sky
- Type: Daily newspaper
- Owner(s): Mangin family (1852–1876); Schwob family (1876–1928); Francis Portais and René Bentz (1928–1944)
- Language: French
- Headquarters: Nantes
- ISSN: 1257-600X

Le Phare de la Loire was a French daily newspaper published in Nantes from 1852 to 1944. It was the last incarnation of a press lineage that began in 1782, successively owned by the Mangin family, the Schwob family, and finally by Francis Portais and his son-in-law René Bentz.

The leading daily newspaper in Nantes throughout its existence, it was banned from publication after the Liberation in 1945 and replaced by La Résistance de l'Ouest, and later by Presse-Océan, a newspaper of modest importance compared to its competitor in Rennes,Ouest-France.

== Newspapers of the Mangin family ==
- 1782: Correspondance Maritime de Nantes, founded by Louis Victor Mangin (1755–1825); the publication continued under various titles until 1825, first under Louis Victor and later sold to another publisher.
- 1819: L'Ami de la Charte, a political, literary, and opinion newspaper in Nantes, founded by Louis Victor in association with his son Charles-Victor (1787–1853); this newspaper, liberal during the Restoration, evolved towards republicanism under the July Monarchy and changed its title in 1837:
- 1837: National de l'Ouest.

After the coup d'état of 2 December 1851, Le National de l'Ouest was suspended on 24 December for its clear opposition to the new regime. In January 1852 Charles-Victor Mangin launched a new newspaper, Le Phare de la Loire, whose title had previously been that of a supplement.

== Le Phare de la Loire ==
=== Mangin period ===
The newspaper became a daily publication in January 1853.

Upon Charles-Victor's death in 1853, management passed to one of his sons, Victor (1819–1867), and after Victor's death to his younger brother Évariste (1825–1901). In the 1860s the editor-in-chief was Léon Laurent-Pichat. The newspaper received several official warnings from the prefect and was prosecuted on several occasions, notably in November 1865 for an article published on 13 October that was judged to "incite hatred and contempt for the Emperor's Government". Évariste Mangin, defended by René Waldeck-Rousseau, was sentenced to one month in prison and a 500-franc fine; Laurent-Pichat, defended by Emmanuel Arago, was sentenced to three months in prison and a fine of 1,000-francs. Further trials took place in November 1867 and March 1868.

During 1870–71 Le Phare supported moderate republicans (including René Waldeck-Rousseau, elected mayor of Nantes in August 1870) and opposed radicals such as Ange Guépin and the newspaper L'Union démocratique. It categorically condemned the Paris Commune.

=== Schwob period ===
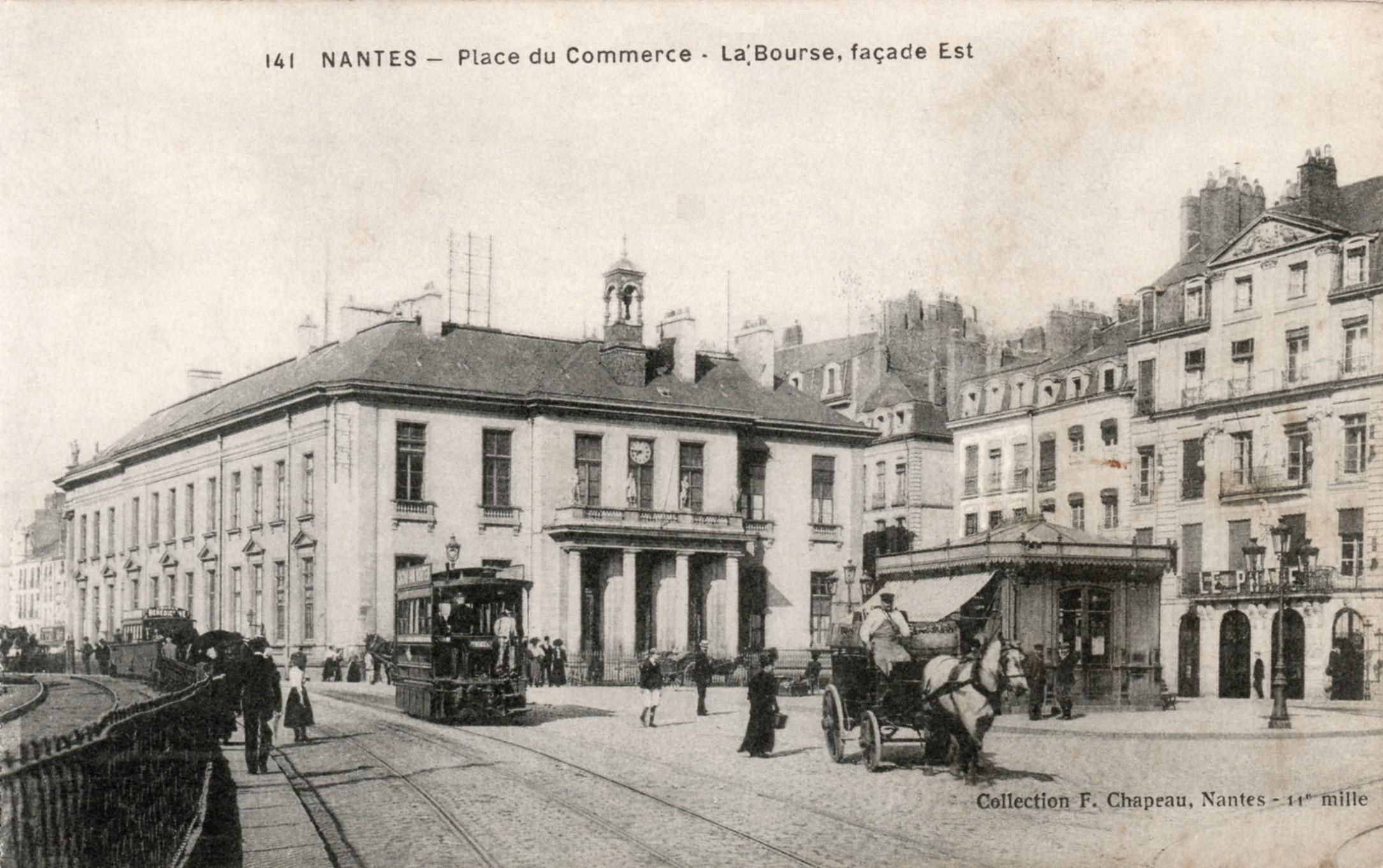
The Le Phare de la Loire building on Place du Commerce (right) before its destruction on 16 September 1943.

In 1876 Évariste sold the newspaper to Georges Schwob (1822–1892), a republican who had settled in Tours, who was succeeded by his son Maurice Schwob (1859–1928).

The newspaper's offices were initially located on rue Scribe in Nantes, then moved in 1901 to a building on Place du Commerce, along with the family apartment.

Le Phare is Nantes' main daily newspaper, alongside L'Espérance du peuple (legitimist then monarchist), founded in 1852, Le Populaire (1874; François Salières then Gaston Veil) and Le Nouvelliste de l'Ouest (1891; Catholic but accepting of the Republic). Le Phare was also distributed in the Loire-Inférieure department, but to a limited extent. However, its main competitor appeared in 1899 in Rennes: Ouest-Éclair(Christian Democrat, later Ouest-France), originally conceived as a newspaper for the whole of western France, whose total circulation quickly exceeded that of Le Phare (300,000 compared to 100,000), even though its position in Nantes remained minimal for a long time.

Among the contributors to Le Phare were Maurice's brother, the writer Marcel Schwob, his daughter Lucy (known as Claude Cahun), and his uncle Léon Cahun.

Before World War I Maurice Schwob took control of the Imprimerie du Commerce printing company, and through it, Le Populaire. In 1919, he reorganized the family business into a group of corporations: the publishing company Le Phare, the printing company, and the Librairie du Commerce bookstore (located in the newspaper's building).

In the 1920s, knowing that his two children, Georges and Lucy, had no intention of taking over the newspaper, Maurice Schwob chose a successor from among the Nantes Republicans, in the person of Francis Portais (1869–1945).

=== Francis Portais period ===
He came from a poor family in the Barbin neighborhood; after completing an apprenticeship as a cabinetmaker, he worked in various commercial professions and became politically active in socialist circles. In the 1890s, he was elected to municipal office and became a leading supporter of Dreyfusard. By 1928, he had shifted to the right, but remained a staunch republican, and it was in this capacity that Maurice Schwob entrusted him with the newspaper.

==== German occupation ====
In 1940, the newspaper was suspended when the Germans arrived on June 19; after a meeting between Francis Portais and Feldkommandant Hotz (1 July),it reappeared on July 3, under the strict control of German censorship, led by Lieutenant Menny.

In October 1940, Francis Portais handed over the management of Le Phare to his son-in-law René Bentz, while remaining the main shareholder and director of the printing works.

Lieutenant Menny found support among a few journalists such as Yves Kermerin, Julien Felice (pseudonym of Gaston Dauneau) and, above all, Lucien Mignoton, who moved to Paris-Soirwhile continuing to write for Le Phare under the pseudonym "Paul Anselme". One journalist, Rémy Vincent, joined the French Resistance very early, sometimes using newspaper vehicles for operations, before going underground, being arrested, and deported to Buchenwald. The external contributor General Audibert also joined the Resistance.

On 16 September 1943 the Place du Commerce building was destroyed in an Allied bombing raid, resulting in the loss of the newspaper's archives. Publication resumed fairly quickly with assistance from Ouest-Éclair in Rennes.

During this period René Bentz had business dealings with the Resistance figure Jacques Chombart de Lauwe ("Colonel Félix"), the departmental military leader in 1944. They were initially partners in a forestry operation intended to supply fuel for the newspaper's vehicles. In February 1944, they reached an agreement on the future of Le Phare: after the Liberation, Jacques Chombart de Lauwe would become political director and minority shareholder. This scenario, which did not comply with the measures planned by the National Council of the Resistance and the Provisional Government of the French Republic, could not be implemented.

==== Liberation ====
After the Liberation of Nantes on 12 August 1944, Le Phare de la Loire appeared for the last time on 13 August, celebrating the event with a collective editorial attempting to justify its publication during the war and condemning collaborationist elements that had appeared in its columns.

However, it was suspended that same evening by the Departmental Liberation Committee (Jean Philippot) and banned from publication on August 15 by the Commissioner of the Republic, Michel Debré. Its assets were requisitioned for the benefit of La Résistance de l'Ouest, which began on August 17. The publishing company was placed under sequestration in early 1945. Jacques Chombart de Lauwe, who was implicated by Jean Philippot, was defended by Michel Debré, who stated in a letter dated January 16 to the CDL that his initiative, although ill-timed, was not punishable by law.

Jacques Chombart de Lauwe, criticised by Jean Philippot, was defended by Michel Debré, who wrote to the liberation committee on 16 January that his initiative, though inopportune, was not punishable in court.

Francis Portais and René Bentz were charged with collaboration. Portais died on 2 February 1945 before trial. In February 1946 René Bentz was sentenced to five months' imprisonment. Among the journalists, Lucien Mignoton was sentenced to death in June 1945 (commuted to life imprisonment with hard labour) and Yves Kermerin to two years. Henry Bousquet, head of local news, escaped conviction and later became editor-in-chief of La Résistance de l'Ouest after a transitional period.

== From La Résistance de l'Ouest to Presse-Océan (1944–1960) ==
The newspaper published on 17 August 1944 was under the control of the Departmental Liberation Committee, with Jean Philippot as director and Paul Gendron as editor-in-chief. Both men moved to other roles during 1945.

Rémy Vincent, returning to Nantes in June 1945, published an account of his concentration-camp experience in July but failed to secure leadership of the paper. In September 1945 La Résistance de l'Ouest came under the political control of the UDSR and financially of several Resistance movements affiliated with it, each represented by shareholders. These shareholders gradually became the owners, notably Claude Berneide-Raynal, who played a key role in 1959 in bringing in Robert Hersant and creating Presse-Océan.

== See also ==
- History of Nantes

== Bibliography ==
- Chantepie, Frank (1977). Le Phare de la Loire et la collaboration [Le Phare de la Loire and the Collaboration]. University of Nantes.
- Kahn, Claude; Landais, Jean (1992). Nantes et les Nantais sous le Second Empire [Nantes and the Nantais under the Second Empire]. Nantes: Ouest éditions et Université inter-âges de Nantes. p. 300. ISBN 2-908261-92-8.
- Cozic, Jean-Charlez; Garnier, Daniel (2008). La presse à Nantes de 1757 à nos jours [The Press in Nantes from 1757 to the Present Day: I. The Mangin Years (1757–1876)]. Vol. I. Les années Mangin (1757-1876). Nantes: L'Atalante. p. 399. ISBN 978-2-84172-395-9.
- Cozic, Jean-Charlez; Garnier, Daniel (2008). La presse à Nantes de 1757 à nos jours [The Press in Nantes from 1757 to the Present Day: II. The Schwob Years (1876–1928)]. Vol. II. Les années Schwob (1876-1928). Nantes: L'Atalante. p. 399. ISBN 978-2-84172-396-6.
- Cozic, Jean-Charlez; Garnier, Daniel (2009). La presse à Nantes de 1757 à nos jours [The Press in Nantes from 1757 to the Present Day: III. From 1928 to the Present]. Vol. III. De 1928 à nos jours. Nantes: L'Atalante. p. 461. ISBN 978-2-84172-397-3.
