= Alawite Revolt =

Alawite revolt may refer to:

- Alawite revolt (1834–35)
- Alawite revolt of 1919

== See also ==
- Arab Revolt (disambiguation)
- Sectarianism and minorities in the Syrian Civil War
