= Arab world protests =

The Arab world protests may refer to the:

- Arab Spring
- Second Arab Spring, also known as "Arab Spring 2.0", "Arab Spring 2", "Arab Spring II", "2nd Arab Spring", and "New Arab Spring"
