= 2018 Tunisian protests =

- Part of the 2018–2022 Arab protests
- Date: 1 January 2018 – February 2018
- Location: Tunisia
- Caused by: Cost of living, taxes, and price hikes
- Goals: Repeal of the 2018 budget
- Methods: Protests; Demonstrations

Parties
Protesters; Opposition	Tunisia: Tunisian police; Tunisian Army

Lead figures
Hamma Hammami (Opposition leader)	Youssef Chahed (Prime Minister); Beji Caid Essebsi (President); Mohamed Ridha Chalghoum (Finance Minister)

Number
Hundreds	2,100 soldiers

Casualties and losses
1 killed, 5 injured, 500+ arrested	50 police injured

Casualties
- Deaths: 1

In January 2018, protests occurred in Tunisia due to economic conditions. As of 9 January, the demonstrations left at least one person dead, and revived worries about the fragile political situation in Tunisia.

The Popular Front, an alliance of leftist opposition parties, called for continued protests against the government's "unjust" austerity measures, while Tunisian Prime Minister Youssef Chahed denounced the violence and appealed for calm, claiming that he and his government believe 2018 "would be the last difficult year for Tunisians".

== Background ==
After the 2011 Revolution, Tunisia was widely seen as the only democratic success story in the Arab Spring, a model "for democratic progress, with free elections and a modern constitution." However, the country has subsequently had nine governments, none of which were able to tackle the country's growing economic problems.

The rise of the labor-protests in Tunisia came from within the UGTT (Tunisians General Labor Union) trade union and its discontent that it has felt over the last couple of years. The continuous lack of internal reform presented the ongoing lack of cooperation and efforts from the government. Discontent from within the UGTT was not only visible in 2012, it also remained visible in 2018, in which they demanded an increase of their salary and wages, along with other structural changes.

== Protests ==
The protests began in response to a new law that took effect on 1 January, and raised taxes on gasoline, phone cards, housing, internet usage, hotel rooms and foods such as fruits and vegetables. Import duties on cosmetics and some agricultural products were also raised. The rise of prices and taxes have made the cost of living for Tunisians tremendously high.

These increasing prices have affected the basic necessities, such as fuel, food and electricity. These price and tax changes were the result of the 2018 finance act, introduced by the government in which they had raised the national inflation rates.

The reason for this inflation has to do with the IMF loan of 2.8 billon dollar that Tunisia’s government agreed upon. This loan however is argued by many activist and economist as having worsened the economy, since the IMF regularly imposed the central Tunisian Bank to devalue their currency. Living circumstances have therefore been very tough for Tunisians, the economic state of the country is therefore noticeably critical. High unemployment rates resulted in frustration and desperation among Tunisians, especially among the youth.

The Protests were focused on these economic grievances, nonetheless these protestors also aimed at critiquing the ongoing corruption. This is a matter that has been a demand since 2011 in Tunisia, but has also been visible in other protests during the 'Arab Spring'. It therefore has along economic and social demands been of importance to the public even since. Thus, the protests were a reflection of both social, economic and political demands, although Tunisia has been described as the single 'success story' of the Middle East, time has shown that this is no longer the case in the country.

The 2018 Tunisian protests are mainly dominated by youth movements, such as the movement 'Fesh nestannew' (what are we waiting for), whom are frustrated by the earlier mentioned new law concerning huge increases in taxes on basic necessities. This group therefore are overall discontent about the daily social and economic circumstances that they have to face.

This younger generation fears for the effects of these new imposed laws and on the future of Tunisia that would include an intensification of unemployment among the youth and lead to an increase in inequality. The aim of these protests thus was call for an withdraw of the 2018 finance act and a call for making an end to such economic injustices that have only resulted into hardships for Tunisians. Another group of demonstrators however, demanded "the fall of the establishment" and are hereby challenging the current actions of the authorities.

Opposition leader Hamma Hammami, stated that several opposition parties would meet in order to coordinate their efforts on Tuesday, 9 January. The opposition then called for a mass protest to be held in the capital city of Tunis on 14 January to mark the seventh anniversary of the Arab Spring uprising, which toppled President Zine El Abidine Ben Ali.

On 8 January, a Jewish school on the Tunisian island of Djerba was firebombed, while there were no protests on the island, locals reported the assailants had exploited the fact that there was lower security presence as police were elsewhere dealing with the protestors. By the evening of 10 January over 2100 troops had been deployed to "protect sovereign institutions and vital facilities", such as "banks, post offices and other government buildings in the country's main cities" according to Defense Ministry spokesman Belhassen al-Waslati. On January 11, witnesses said that Tunisian protesters "burned down a regional national security headquarters near the Algerian border" as the government deployed security forces and said it will "not revise austerity measures in the 2018 budget."

== Casualties ==
It was confirmed in a statement by the Ministry of the Interior on 8 January that a man had been admitted to a Tebourba hospital with symptoms of dizziness and later died. His body had shown no signs of violence and a forensic doctor has been tasked with determining the man's cause of death. The government stated that the likely cause was due to inhalation of tear gas. Five others were injured in the demonstrations according to a report published by Tunis Afrique Presse.

Interior ministry spokesman Khelifa Chibani said about 50 policemen were wounded and 237 people were arrested on 9 January. This was echoed by the BBC, which said on 10 January that more than 200 people were arrested across the country and at least 49 police officers were injured during these clashes with demonstrators. As of 12 January 778 people had been arrested by the police in response to the protests.

On 12 January, the Spokesperson for OHCHR, Rupert Colville, stated that "the United Nations is closely watching the demonstrations across Tunisia and the authorities’ response to them". He posed his concern about the high number of arrests and asserted that "authorities must ensure that those exercising their rights to freedom of expression and peaceful assembly are not prevented from doing so." Mr. Colville added that "peaceful demonstrators must not be held responsible or penalised for the violent acts of others" and urged all "sides to work together towards resolving, with full respect for human rights, the economic and social problems underpinning the unrest."

== External Responses ==
The governments of Britain, Germany, Sweden, Norway and Belgium warned their citizens about potential rioting, while Turkish President Recep Tayyip Erdoğan spoke with Tunisian leaders about the protests, saying he believed that when the country "stands united" Tunisia would "overcome its problems." The embassy of the United States in the country put out a statement as well, hereby reminding U.S. citizens "residing in and visiting Tunisia to exercise caution, avoid demonstrations and crowds and monitor local media for breaking events."

== Internal Responses ==
The majority of the protests remained peaceful, yet some turned into more violent confrontations between the police and the protestors. These violent-clashes can be depicted in the way the government reacted towards the protests, doing so quite harshly. In the town 'EttadHamen' the government used teargas to suppress the protestors, this clearly shows an example of the harsh and violent reaction by the government. The government's reaction towards the erupted protests were mainly focusing on condemning the protestors and highlighting criminal offenses, such as looting and theft that according to governmental officials erupted during these protests.

The government therefore gave less or almost no attention to the demands of these protests, in which demonstrators called for an end to these social and economic difficulties. Instead, the army was demanded to operate in various of cities to safeguard governmental buildings from the protestors that were demonstrating outside of these buildings.

Ennahdha, a party in the governing coalition of Tunisia condemned the "exploitation of citizens' legitimate demands by certain anarchist groups" and stressed "the legitimacy of demands for development and employment and citizens full right to peaceful protest without violating the safety of others or attacking private and public property". On the other hand, the opposition alliance, Popular Front, called for "all Tunisian people [to] go out to the streets for a peaceful protests country wide for one clear goal, which is to bring down these actions that destroyed the Tunisian country and its people."

The Trotskyist WSWS, which is a website supportive of the protests, argued that in Tunisia elements of the old regime "managed to reconsolidate power in the interests of the native ruling elites and international capital," further saying that the reforms imposed by the government are pushed to "meet the conditions demanded by the International Monetary Fund and the European Union." Other supportive websites said that these "brave Tunisians...[are] courageous people rebelling long into the night [who] will continue on with or without our support."

The Tunisian prime minister critiqued the opposition party for encouraging the protestors to pose their discontent. Hamma Hamni, the leader of the opposition party 'Popular Front', claimed that protests would only end if the president would withdraw the set budget for 2018. Moreover, the government responded by promising 70.3 billion dollar, aiming at helping poorer families and providing healthcare to those in need. Many Tunisians however, remained skeptical of such promises and rather wanted to see long term solutions, Tunisians have dealt with many protests over the years and are therefore hoping to receive long term solutions that are aimed at decreasing inequality, poverty and unemployment rates.

== See also ==
- Tunisian bread riots
- Tunisian Revolution
- 2011–2012 Tunisian protests
- 2013–2014 Tunisian political crisis
- 2016 Tunisian protests
- 2018–2022 Arab protests
- 2021 Tunisian self-coup
- 2021 Tunisian protests
