= Imaginary Lives =

Collection of short stories by Marcel Schwob

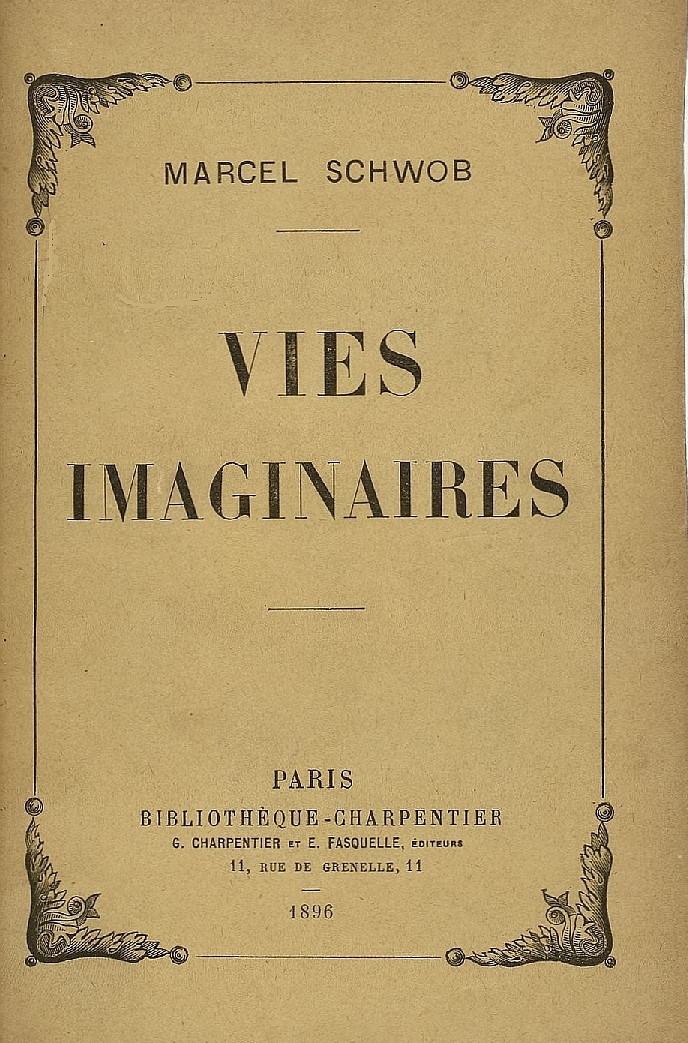
- The cover image of the original 1896 edition of Vies imaginaires (Imaginary Lives)
- Author: Marcel Schwob
- Original title: Vies imaginaires
- Translator: Lorimer Hammond (1924), Harry Hives (1991), Chris Clarke (2018)
- Language: French
- Publisher: Bibliothèque-Charpentier (1896)
- Publication date: 1896
- Publication place: France
- English publication date: 1924, 1952 (paperback, Avon), 2018 (New translation).
- Media type: Print

Imaginary Lives (original French title: Vies imaginaires) is a collection of twenty-two semi-biographical short stories by Marcel Schwob, first published in book form in 1896. Mixing known and fantastical elements, it was one of the first works in the genre of biographical fiction. The book is an acknowledged influence in Jorge Luis Borges's book A Universal History of Infamy (1935). Borges also translated the last story "Burke and Hare, Assassins" into Spanish.

Most chapters had been published individually in the newspaper Le Journal between 1894 and 1895. For the collected edition he substituted "Vie de Morphiel, démiurge" with "Matoaka", which had appeared in 1893 in L'Echo de Paris and that he renamed "Pocahontas, princesse". The story "Lilith" about painter and poet Dante Gabriel Rossetti was provably the first one that he wrote in the genre of biographical fiction. It had already been collected in 1891 in the book Coeur double, and perhaps that is the reason it was not included in Imaginary Lives.

Originally translated into English in 1924 by Lorimer Hammond, Imaginary Lives was published in a new translation by Chris Clarke (Wakefield Press, 2018), a translation which was awarded the 2019 French-American Foundation Translation Prize for Fiction.

== Contents ==
Original title	Title in English	Protagonists
"Empédocle, Dieu supposé"	"'Empedocles, Supposed God"	Empedocles
"Erostrate, Incendiaire"	"Erostate, Incendiary"	Herostratus
"Cratès, Cynique"	"Crates, Cynic"	Crates of Thebes
"Septima, Incantatrice"	"'Septima, Enchantress"	Septima and other characters from a curse tablet
"Lucrèce, Poète"	"Lucretius, Poet"	Lucretius
"Clodia, Matronne impudique"	"Clodia, Immodest Matron"	Clodia
"Pétrone, Romancier"	"Petronius, Novelist"	Petronius
"Sufrah, Géomancien"	"Sufrah, Geomancer"	Sorcerer from the story of Aladdin
"Frate Dolcino, Hérétique"	"Fra Dolcino, Heretic"	Fra Dolcino
"Cecco Angiolieri, Poète haineux"	"Cecco Angiolieri, Hateful Poet"	Cecco Angiolieri
"Paolo Uccello, Peintre"	"Paolo Uccello, Painter"	Paolo Ucello
"Nicolas Loyseleur, Juge"	"'Nicolas Loyseleur, Judge"	One of the judges of Joan of Arc
'"Katherine la Dentellière, Fille amoureuse"	"Katherine the Lacemaker, Girl of the Streets"	Fictional lover of Casin Cholet
"Alain le Gentil, Soldat"	"Alain the Gentle, Soldier"	Characters from the criminal registry of Saint-Martin-des-Champs
"Gabriel Spenser, Acteur"	"Gabriel Spenser, Actor"	Gabriel Spenser
"Pocahontas, Princesse"	"Pocahontas, Princess"	Pocahontas
"Cyril Tourneur, Poète tragique"	"Cyril Tourneur, Tragic Poet"	Cyril Tourneur
"William Phips, Pêcheur de trésors"	"William Phips, Treasure Hunter"	William Phips
"Le Capitaine Kid, Pirate"	"Captain Kidd, Pirate"	William Kidd
"Walter Kennedy, Pirate illettré"	"Walter Kennedy, Illiterate Pirate"	Walter Kennedy
"Le Major Stede Bonnet, Pirate par humeur"	"Major Stede Bonnet, Pirate by Fancy"	Stede Bonnet
"MM. Burke et Hare, Assassins"	"Mr. Burke and Mr. Hare, Assassins"	Burke and Hare

== Sources ==
- Allain, Patrice. et al. Marcel Schwob: L’Homme au masque d’or. Nantes: Gallimard, 2006. Catalog of a major exhibition on Schwob at the Municipal Library of Nantes.
- Borges, Jorge Luis. Miscelánea. Barcelona: Random House Mondadori, 2011.
- González-Rivas Fernández, Ana, Francisco García Jurado, "Death and Love in Poe's and Schwob's Readings of the Classics". CLCWeb: Comparative Literature and Culture 10.4. 2000, pp. 5–8 link to essay
- Goudemare, Sylvain. Marcel Schwob ou les vies imaginaires. Paris: Le Cherche Midi, 2000.
- Jefferson, Ann. Biography and the Question of Literature in France. Oxford: Oxford University Press, 2007. pp. 200–214
- Schwob, Marcel. Imaginary Lives, tr. Lorimer Hammond. New York: Boni and Liveright, 1924.
- Schwob, Marcel. Imaginary Lives, tr. Harry G. Hives. Wakefield, N.H: Longwood Academic, 1991.
- Schwob, Marcel. The King in the Golden Mask and other writings, tr. Iain White. Manchester: Carcanet New Press Limited, 1982.
- Schwob, Marcel.Oeuvres. Paris; Les Belles Lettres, 2002.
- Villon, François. The Poems of François Villon Hanover, University Press of New England, 1965
- Zieger, Robert. Asymptote: An Approach to Decadent Fiction. New York: Edition Rodolpi B. V. 2009
