= Linquo coax ranis =

Two-line poem by 12th-century abbot Serlo of Wilton

Linquo coax ranis are the first words of a two-line poem in internally rhymed hexameters by Serlo of Wilton. The complete text is:

Linquo coax ranis, cras corvis, vanaque vanis;
Ad logicam pergo que mortis non timet ergo.

Translation:

I leave croaking to frogs, crowing to crows, and vanity to the vain;
I now go to the logic that does not fear the conclusion of death.

Attached to the poem is a story (which may be compared with the razós attached to certain Occitan poems of the 12th and 13th centuries). The earliest known version of the story, in Latin, forms part of a manuscript collection, Liber narrationum de diversis visionibus et miraculis, which itself is part of MS. Troyes 946 from the Abbey of Clairvaux collection. This version was written at some date after 1173, when Serlo became abbot of L'Aumône Abbey, and before 1181, the year of his death.

According to the story, one of Serlo's disciples, who had died young, appeared to him in a vision. He was wearing a parchment cape covered with writing: on it were written all the sophistries of scholastic philosophy. The disciple told Serlo that the cape was painfully heavy and burning hot. Serlo reached out to touch his disciple, and withdrew his hand hastily, scalded by a drop of burning sweat. After seeing this vision, Serlo "converted", spoke these memorable lines, entered the Cistercian Order, and eventually became abbot of L'Aumône.

The legend was investigated by the French novelist and philologist Marcel Schwob in his pamphlet La légende de Serlon de Wilton (Paris, 1899).
