= Marcel Schwob =

French writer (1867–1905)

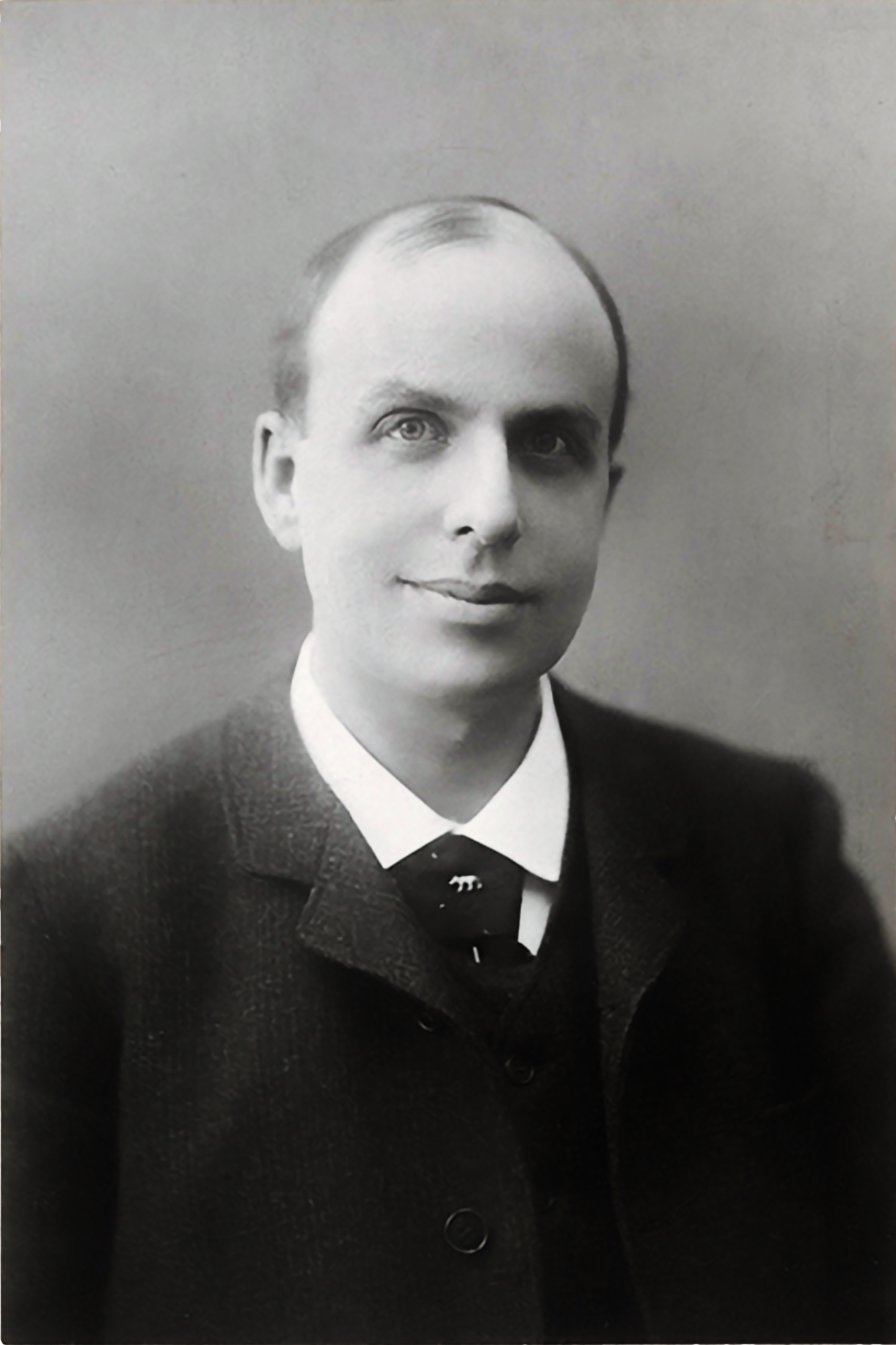
- Born: August 23, 1867; Chaville, Hauts-de-Seine, France
- Died: February 26, 1905 (aged 37); Paris, France
- Occupations: Writer, journalist
- Spouse: Marguerite Moreno (m. 1900)

Mayer André Marcel Schwob, known as Marcel Schwob (23 August 1867 – 26 February 1905), was a French symbolist writer best known for his short stories and his literary influence on authors such as Jorge Luis Borges, Alfonso Reyes, Roberto Bolaño and Patricio Pron. He has been called a "precursor of Surrealism". In addition to over a hundred short stories, he wrote journalistic articles, essays, biographies, literary reviews and analysis, translations and plays. He was extremely well known and respected during his life and notably befriended a great number of intellectuals and artists of the time.

== Early life (1867–89) ==
He was born in Chaville, Hauts-de-Seine on 23 August 1867 into a cultivated Jewish family. His father, George Schwob, was a friend of Théodore de Banville and Théophile Gautier. His mother, Mathilde Cahun, came from a family of intellectuals from Alsace. He was the brother of Maurice Schwob and uncle of Claude Cahun (born Lucy Schwob).

His family had just returned from Egypt, where his father had headed the cabinet of the Ministry of Foreign Affairs for ten years. When the French Third Republic began, the Schwob family lived in Tours, where George became the director of the newspaper Le Républicain d'Indre-et-Loire. In 1876, he moved to Nantes to direct the Republican daily Le Phare de la Loire; after he died in 1892, his eldest son Maurice, born in 1859, took his place.

At age 11 he discovered the work of Edgar Allan Poe translated by Charles Baudelaire. He then read the original versions of his tales in English and they proved to be a lifelong influence in his writing. In 1878–79, he studied at the Lycée of Nantes where he won the 1st Prize for Excellence. In 1881, he was sent to Paris to live with his maternal uncle Léon Cahun, Chief Librarian of the Mazarine Library, and continue his studies at the Lycée Louis-le-Grand, where he became friends with Léon Daudet and Paul Claudel. He developed a gift for languages and quickly became multilingual. In 1884, he discovered Robert Louis Stevenson, who was to become one of his friends and role models. He studied philology and Sanscrit under Ferdinand de Saussure at the École pratique des hautes études in 1883–84. He then completed his military service in Vannes, joining the artillery.

He failed his entrance exams for the École normale supérieure, but he earned a Bachelor of Arts in 1888. He became a professional journalist, collaborating in the Phare de la Loire, the Événement and L'Écho de Paris.

== Early work (1890–1897) ==
He had a passion for French slang, and in particular for the language of the Coquillards used by Villon in his Ballads in Jargon: unlike the widespread opinion at the time (developed by Victor Hugo in Les Misérables), Schwob considered that slang is not a language that is created spontaneously, but that it is actually an artificial language in code.

For seven years he wrote short stories that were collected in six books: Cœur double ("Double Heart", 1891), Le roi au masque d'or ("The King in the Golden Mask", 1892), Mimes (1893), Le livre de Monelle ("The Book of Monelle", 1894), La croisade des enfants ("The Children's Crusade", 1896) and Vies imaginaires ("Imaginary Lives", 1896). His last short story, "L'étoile de bois," is the longest one he wrote and was published in 1897. Two large reprint collections of his stories were published during his lifetime: La porte des rêves (The Gate of Dreams, 1899), illustrated by Georges de Feure, and La lampe de Psyché (Psyche's Lamp, 1903).

Along with Stuart Merrill, Adolphe Retté and Pierre Louÿs, Marcel Schwob worked on Oscar Wilde's play Salome, which was written in French to avoid a British law forbidding the depiction of Bible characters on stage. Wilde struggled with his French, and the play was proofread and corrected by Marcel Schwob for its first performance in Paris in 1896.

== Late work (1898–1905) ==
In the last eight years of his life Schwob was often too sick to work, but he managed to complete a number of projects, although with the exception of the play Jane Shore, and "Dialogues d'Utopie" (written in 1905), he never wrote any more original fiction. He did write articles, introductions and essays, adapted and translated several plays, and planned or began numerous projects that remained unfinished when he died.

Interior cover of the comics anthology Lapin, issue 16 (July 1997), featuring a portrait of Schwob by Emmanuel Guibert.

== Travels ==
Ting Tse-Ying was a young Chinese scholar from Saint-Louis, Senegal, fluent in English, whom Schwob had met at the Chinese pavilion at the closing of Paris's Exposition Universelle and hired as a domestic servant, personal assistant and travelling companion. Ting later worked for explorer Paul Pelliot, whom he accompanied to Turkestan.

In 1901, assisted by Ting, he travelled first to Jersey, where he stayed for several weeks, and then to Uriage, trying to improve his health. He then began the biggest voyage of his life, traveling to Samoa, like his hero Stevenson, in search of his tomb. Leaving from Marseille, he stopped in Port Said, Djibouti, Aden, toured Sri Lanka, Sydney and finally Vailima, where Stevenson had lived. There, he met people who had known Stevenson. He stayed for a little less than a month. He became very sick in the island, lost a lot of weight and was forced to return to Paris in a hurry without having visited the tomb. Because of regional racism, Ting was arrested on several occasions and prevented from accompanying Schwob in some parts of the trip. Schwob complained about this in his letters to Moreno.

In 1904, at the invitation of Francis Marion Crawford and accompanied by Ting, he took a boat trip to Naples, stopping in Porto, Lisbon, Barcelona, Marseille and finally Naples. He stayed for two weeks in Crawford's villa in Sant'Agnello in Sorrento. Bored, he left for France, stopping in Aix-les-Bains where his wife joined him. He then went to the Canton of Vaud in Switzerland, the Plombières in Belgium and finally Carnac, where Moreno, once again, joined him. His health had further worsened and they returned to Paris.

== Personal life ==
=== Friendships ===
Throughout his life, Schwob associated with or befriended a great number of notables from the worlds of art and literature. They include Léon Daudet, Alphonse Daudet, Paul Claudel, Anatole France, Edmond de Goncourt, Jean Lorrain, J.-H. Rosny aîné, Auguste Bréal, Paul Arène, Maurice Spronck, Jules Renard, Paul Margueritte, Paul Hervieu, Charles Maurras, Rachilde, Octave Mirbeau, Catulle Mendès, Guillaume Apollinaire, Henri Barbusse, Georges Courteline, Paul Valéry, Colette, Oscar Wilde, Pierre Louÿs, George Meredith, Maurice Maeterlinck, Alfred Jarry, Aristide Bruant, Marcel Proust, Robert de Montesquiou, Édouard Manet, Auguste Rodin, Camille Claudel and Jehan Rictus.

In 1903 Schwob reflected on the passing of several of his closest friends, all cultural celebrities at the time. He wrote to Edmund Gosse: "I have been sadly tried in my friends since a few years. Stevenson and Verlaine, Mallarmé and now Henley and Whistler are gone". Aleister Crowley also considered Schwob a friend and asked him to translate two of his sonnets: "Rodin" and "Balzac". Schwob was also friends with Lucien Guitry and tried to help him reconcile with his son, Sacha Guitry. Decades later Sacha went on to make several films with Marguerite Moreno.

=== Relationships ===
The two loves of his life were a young woman known as Louise and the celebrated actress Marguerite Moreno. Schwob met Louise, a working-class girl who might have been a prostitute, in 1891, when he was 24 years old and she was 23. He kept the relationship hidden and exchanged letters with her, most of which he later destroyed. After two years she died of tuberculosis. He was devastated and confided in many of his friends. He dedicated Le livre de Monelle to her, basing the central character on Louise, but turning her into a child of indeterminate age. Many consider this his most personal work, and it is the single book for which he became best known during his lifetime.

In 1894, the year after Louise's death, Schwob met Marguerite Moreno, who, at 23, had been named by Stéphane Mallarmé "the sacred muse of Symbolism", and was the lover of Catulle Mendès. She had posed for sculptor Jean Dampt, artists Edmond Aman-Jean, Joseph Granié and often for Lucien Lévy-Dhurmer. In January 1895 they were officially together and they were married in London five years later, in 1900. Charles Whibley, the English writer, was a witness at the wedding. Their relationship was unconventional. They spent much time apart, due to Moreno's career and Schwob's frequent travels.

== Health and death ==
He became sick in 1896 with a chronic incurable intestinal disorder. He also suffered from recurring conditions that were generally diagnosed as influenza or pneumonia, and he received intestinal surgery several times. After two surgeries by doctor Joaquin Albarrán, Robert de Montesquiou recommended the care of the well-known doctor and surgeon Samuel Jean de Pozzi, who had been lovers with Sarah Bernhardt and was later painted by John Singer Sargent. At first his treatments had some positive effects, relieving Schwob from his constant pain. In appreciation, Schwob dedicated La porte des rêves to him. But by 1900, after two more surgeries, Pozzi told him that he could not do anything else for him. In the following years he ate only kefir and fermented milk. In February 1905, after nine years of serious recurring episodes, he died at age 37, of pneumonia while his wife was away on tour, performing in Aix-en-Provence. He was surrounded by Ting, his brother Maurice and his biographer Pierre Champion.

== Teaching ==
Starting in December 1904 he taught a course on Villon at the École des hautes études that was attended by, among others, Michel Bréal, Édouard and Pierre Champion, Paul Fort, Max Jacob, Auguste Longnon, Pablo Picasso, Catherine Pozzi (daughter of one of his doctors), André Salmon and Louis Thomas.

== Dedications ==
- Paul Valéry dedicated two of his works to him - Introduction à la méthode de Léonard de Vinci and the Soirée avec M. Teste.
- Alfred Jarry dedicated his Ubu Roi to Schwob.
- Oscar Wilde dedicated to him his long poem "The Sphinx" (1894) "in friendship and admiration."

== Influence ==
- The Book of Monelle, in 1894, influenced The Fruits of the Earth by André Gide (Schwob accused Gide of plagiarism).
- The Children's Crusade influenced William Faulkner's As I Lay Dying and Jerzy Andrzejewski's The Gates of Paradise.
- Max Ernst quoted him in Une semaine de bonté (1934).
- Jorge Luis Borges wrote that his book Historia universal de la infamia (A Universal History of Infamy, 1936) was inspired by Schwob's Imaginary Lives.

== Misinformation ==
An often repeated, yet baseless rumor, states that Schwob died from syphilis. It seems to have its origins in the book The Love that Dared Not Speak Its Name by H. Montgomery Hyde, in which he wrote that Schwob died from the "effects of a syphilitic tumor in the rectum, which he acquired as a result of anal intercourse with an infected youth." This apocryphal theory contradicts almost everything that is known about Schwob's health and sexual activities. Schwob received treatments for syphilis on two occasions, but that does not seem to be the reason for his deteriorating health.

His birth name, Mayer André Marcel Schwob, is clearly indicated on both his birth certificate and marriage license, both in the possession of the Harold B. Lee Library of Brigham Young University. Despite this well-documented fact, several biographical texts erroneously continue to list his "real name" as "André Marcel Mayer" and "Marcel Schwob" as an alias.

== Works ==
Collections of short stories

- Cœur double ("Double Heart", 1891)
- Le roi au masque d'or ("The King in the Golden Mask", 1892)
- Mimes (1893)
- Le livre de Monelle ("The Book of Monelle", 1894)
- La croisade des enfants ("The Children's Crusade", 1896)
- Vies imaginaires ("Imaginary Lives", 1896)
- La porte des rêves (1899), collecting fifteen stories selected from Cœur double, Le roi au masque d'or and Le livre de Monelle. Art directed by Octave Uzanne and illustrated by Georges de Feure.
- La lampe de Psyché (1903), collecting Mimes, La croisade des enfants, Le livre de Monelle and "L'étoile de bois"

Stories not collected during his lifetime

- "L'épingle d'or" (1889)
- "Articles d'exportation" (1890)
- "Les noces du Tibre" (1890)
- "Blanches-mains", "La démoniaque", "Barbe-Noire" (1892)
- "Rampsinit", "L'origine", La maison close", "La main de gloire" (1893)
- "Vie de Morphiel, demiurge", an uncollected chapter of Vies imaginaires (1895)
- "Dialogues d'Utopie" (1905)
- "Maua", a private unpublished text (first printed in 2009)

Other stories

- "Le deuxième Phédon" and "L'Île de la liberté" (1892). These were combined and retitled "L'Anarchie" for Spicilège (1896)
- "Les marionettes de l'amour" and "La femme comme Parangon d'art" in the anthology Féminies (1896). These dramatic dialogues were retitled "L'Amour" and "L'Art" for Spicilège

Theatre

- Jane Shore (written with Eugène Morand, 1900)
- Jane Shore, a Drama in Five Acts (written with Eugène Morand, 1901)

Non-fiction

- Étude sur l'argot français with Georges Guieyesse ("Study of French Slang", 1889)
- Le jargon des coquillards en 1455 ("The Jargon of the Coquillards in 1455", 1890)
- Lecture on the play Annabella et Giovanni ('Tis Pity She's a Whore) by John Ford (1895), translated into French by Maurice Maeterlinck for Sarah Bernhardt.
- Spicilège (1896)
- La légende de Serlon de Wilton ("The Legend of Serlo of Wilton", 1899. See also Linquo coax ranis)
- Mœurs des diurnales ("Habits of Day Persons", under the pseudonym of Loyson-Bridet, 1903)
- Le parnasse satyrique du XVe siècle ("The 15th-century satirical poets", 1905)
- Il libro della mia memoria (1905)
- François Villon (1912)
- Chroniques (1981)
- Correspondance inédite : précédée de quelques textes inédits (unpublished correspondence, 1985)
- Will du moulin. Suivi de Correspondances. M. Schwob, Robert-Louis Stevenson (1992)
- Vers Samoa ("To Samoa", 2002)
- Un Don Quichotte égoïste: Notes d'une conférence sur Peer Gynt d'Ibsen
- Merlin Coccaïe

Introductions

- Le démon de l'absurde by Rachilde, 1893.
- Messieurs les ronds-de-cuir by Georges Courteline, 1893
- The Dynamiter by Robert Louis Stevenson, 1894.
- Moll Flanders by Daniel Defoe, 1895.
- La chambre blanche by Henry Bataille, 1895.
- La légende de saint Julien l'Hospitalier by Gustave Flaubert, 1895.
- La chaîne d'or by Théophile Gautier, 1896.
- The Tragedy of Hamlet, Prince of Denmark by William Shakespeare, 1900.
- Hiésous by Pierre Nahor (Emilie Lerou) 1903.
- Le Petit et le Grand Testament de François Villon by Honoré Champion, 1905.

Translations and Adaptations

- Die Spiele der Griechen und Römer by Wilhelm Richter, translated with Auguste Bréal, 1891.
- "The Selfish Giant" by Oscar Wilde, 1891.
- Moll Flanders by Daniel Defoe, 1895.
- Last Days of Immanuel Kant by Thomas de Quincey. 1899.
- "Will o' the Mill" by Robert Louis Stevenson in La Vogue, 1899.
- The Tragedy of Hamlet, Prince of Denmark by William Shakespeare play, jointly with Eugène Morand for Sarah Bernhardt, 1900.
- The Tudor Translations : Rabelais by William Ernest Henley, pref. by Charles Whibley, unknown publisher, 1900
- Strange Case of Dr Jekyll and Mr Hyde A play in four acts by Robert Louis Stevenson. Theatrical adaptation of the novella in English with Vance Thompson. The French version was never finished. 1900.
- Francesca da Rimini by Francis Marion Crawford for Sarah Bernhardt, 1902.
- La maison du péché, unproduced play in five acts for Sarah Bernhardt adapted from the novel by Marcelle Tinayre. 1903.
- Rabelais in England by Charles Whibley, Paris, Revue des études rabelaisiennes, 1903.

Unfinished Projects

- "Poupa, scènes de la vie latine" (1883-6), a novel of which he only wrote an outline and fragments.
- La légende de Saint Françoise d'Assise
- François Villon et son temps, left unfinished at the time of his death.
- Angélique de Longueval, a melodrama in four parts.
- L'incantatrice, a drama of ancient times.
- The life of Marie d'Oignies.
- Translation of Macbeth by William Shakespeare for Sarah Bernhardt
- A play inspired by Les filles du feu.
- Mentioned in Pierre Champion's introduction to Vers Samoa: Océanide, Vaililoa, Captain Crabbe, Cissy, De la pourpre des mers a la pourpre des flots and a translation Romeo and Juliet.

Illustrated editions

- 1893 Mimes, George Auriol (cover), Mercure de France
- 1894 Mimes, Jean Veber (cover), Mercure de France
- 1896 Féminies, Georges de Feure (cover) Félicien Rops and others (interiors), Academie des Beaux Livres
- 1896 La croisade des enfants, Maurice Delcourt (cover), Mercure de France
- 1899 La porte des rêves, Georges de Feure, H. Floury pour Les Bibliophiles indépendants
- 1925 Coeur double, Fernand Siméon, Henri Jonquières (Les Beaux Romans)
- 1929 Le roi au masque d’or, Stefan Mrożewski, Apollo Éditions Artistiques
- 1929 Vies imaginaires, Georges Barbier, Le Livre contemporain
- 1930 La croisade des enfants, Jean-Gabriel Daragnès, Manuel Bruker
- 1933 Mimes, Jean-Gabriel Daragnès, Les Bibliophiles de l'Automobile-club de France
- 1946 Le livre de Monelle, Henri Matisse (cover), Ides et Calendes (Collection du Fleuron)
- 1946 Vies imaginaires, Félix Labisse, Editions Lumière (Le Rêve et la Vie)
- 1949 La cruzada de los niños, Norah Borges, La Perdiz (Colección La Perdiz)
- 1965 Le livre de Monelle, Leonor Fini, Editions L.C.L. (Peintres du livre)
- 1992 Le roi au masque d’or, Daniel Airam, Les Bibliophiles de l'Automobile Cub de France
- 1996 Deux contes latins: Poupa et Les noces du Tibre, Christian Lacroix, Gallimard (Cabinet des lettrés)
- 2001 White Voices (La croisade des enfants'), Keith Bayliss, The Old Stile Press
- 2012 La cruzada de los niños (La croisade des enfants), José Hernández, E.D.A. Libros (= Ediciones de Aquí), (Las musarañas)

== Adaptations ==
=== Music ===
- Oratorio La Croisade des Enfants, Gabriel Pierné. This is the composer's best known piece. 1902.

=== Film ===
- Il re della maschera d'oro. Silent film by Alfredo Robert (1877–1964) based on Le roi au masque d’or. 1920
- Jean Vigo's classic film L'Atalante (1934) seems inspired by the story "Bargette" from Le roi au masque d'or.
- Clodia – Fragmenta. Experimental film by Franco Brocani (b. 1938) loosely based on "Clodia, Matronne impudique" from Vies Imaginaries. 1982

=== Comics ===
- Lapin #16 L’Association, July 1997. Issue dedicated to Schwob containing three adaptations to comics:
  - David B., "La Terreur future" (from Coeur Double)
  - Emmanuel Guibert, "La Voluptueuse" (from Le livre de Monelle)
  - Vincent Sardon "L’homme voilé" (from Coeur Double)
  - It also includes an adaptation of the diary of Paul Léautaud by Jean-Christophe Menu
- Viktor adapted from "L’Étoile de bois" by Tommy Redolfi, Editions Paquet. 2007
- Le capitaine écarlate. Emmanuel Guibert (art) and David B. (script), Free Area, 2000. An imaginative and surreal story where Schwob is the protagosnist and interacts with several of his creations. Includes a reprint of "Le roi au masque d’or"

=== Theatre ===
- Monelle, Zouzou Leyens, Theatre les Tanneurs, Brussels, 2008

=== Radio ===
- Histoire de Monelle radio play adapted by Victoria Cohen and Lionel Ménasché from Le Livre de Monelle for the program Fictions / Drôles de drames aired by France Culture (Radio France)
