= 2018–2019 Omani protests =

Protest against unemployment and inflation

- Part of 2018–2024 Arab protests
- Date: First wave: 22–29 January 2018; Second wave: December 2018 – 9 January 2019
- Location: Oman
- Caused by: Austerity; General unemployment; Youth unemployment; High fuel prices
- Methods: Demonstrations
- Result: First wave: Pledge by the government to create 25000 additional jobs for Omani nationals; 6-months ban on employing expats in certain professions; Additional fees for employing expats in certain professions; Second wave: Government capping price on regular petrol; Establishment of the National Center for Employment; Additional welfare spending and salary increases for public employees

Casualties
- Arrested: First wave: At least 30 protestors, who were later released; Second wave: Several people, including 2 journalists covering the protests, who were later released

The 2018–2019 Omani protests were nationwide protests and rallies in which tens of thousands of protesters marched against skyrocketing unemployment and inflation in the Sultanate of Oman. These protests were part of a larger series of anti-government protests in several Arab countries, known as the 2018–2024 Arab protests. Over a 13-month period between January 2018 and January 2019, Omani citizens went out into the streets on several occasions to rally against decisions made by their government, whilst demanding more employment opportunities as well as economic reforms.

== Timeline ==
=== First wave (January 2018) ===
In the afternoon of Monday the 22nd of January 2018, a large group of Omani citizens began to gather outside the Ministry of Manpower in Muscat. As the crowd grew bigger, protesters reportedly started shouting chants such as: 'we want jobs' and 'we are tired of waiting'. As riot police stood on guard, several of the young unemployed protesters demonstrating against the lack of job opportunities were invited into the Ministry building to discuss their grievances with officials.

Exactly one week later, on January 29, protesters gathered once again in the Omani capital. This time, demonstrations spread to provincial cities Salalah and Sur. Protesters' demands mainly targeted the lack of job opportunities within the Sultanate as well as the high unemployment rate, with the national rate being estimated at 15% nationally and over 30% for young people the year before.

Numerous arrests were made by riot-police in the Southern Dhofar governorate in January 2018, with protesters reportedly being released that same day.

In response of the nationwide protests, the Omani government announced that it would be creating 25 thousand jobs over the next six months, that were to be filled by Omani nationals only. Furthermore, Oman's Minister of Manpower Abdullah bin Nasser al-Bakri stated that the recruitment of expatriate labor to certain professions would be restricted during that same period. In total, Oman banned the issuance of new visas for expatriate workers in 87 private sector professions and increased the fees for sponsoring expatriate employees. As promised, it also managed to create 25 thousands public sector jobs for its citizens.

=== Second wave (December 2018 - January 2019) ===
Unrest resurfaced in the Sultanate of Oman towards the end of 2018. In december, thousands of protesters rallied against economic hardship and once again requested more job opportunities. Protests reached the cities of Muscat, Sohar, Sur and Salalah and were composed mostly of recent graduates and unemployed youth. Within certain professions, strikes were reported throughout the country.

On January 1, 2019, renewed protests broke out in Oman's biggest cities: Muscat and Salalah. People in the streets protested high unemployment rates and austerity measures adopted by the regime to compensate for decreasing oil prices. These measures involved cutting government spending on subsidies by over OMR500 million (approx. USD1.3bn) in 2015-2016. In previous years, the Omani government capped the price of regular petrol; diesel and super petrol remained linked to international crude oil prices. Similar public demonstrations had taken place in Oman in 2015 after transportation fuel prices were indexed to international market prices.

The demonstrations that took place in early January 2019 triggered a swift response by the Omani government. Existing visa-bans for expatriates that were installed after the 2018 protests were extended. On January 6, the Omani government announced that it would establish a new body to alleviate the employment-crisis. The so-called National Center for Employment was created to help Omanis to navigate the national labor market. As a result, protests and strikes came to an end on January 9, 2019.

==== Police response ====
Polices responses to the late 2018 protests were reported to have been excessive at times, with some people being arrested immediately upon their arrival to the protest site. Some protesters reportedly were being released quickly, whereas for others that has remained unclear. Over the course of 2018, at least 30 people protesting unemployment were arrested and later released in Oman. In 2019, police forces detained two radio journalists from Hala FM who were covering an unemployment protest in Muscat. Police also reportedly forced social media users at the protest to delete the photos and videos which they had taken.

== See also ==
- 2011 Omani protests
