= Serlo of Wilton =

12th-century English poet

- Born: c. 1105; Wilton, England
- Died: 1181; L'Aumône Abbey, France
- Writing career
- Language: Latin
- Notable work: Linquo coax ranis

Serlo of Wilton (c. 1105–1181) was a 12th-century English poet, a friend of Walter Map and known to Gerald of Wales. He studied and taught at the University of Paris. He became a Cluniac and then a Cistercian monk, and in 1171 he became abbot of L'Aumône Abbey, a Cistercian monastery between Chartres and Blois. He died in 1181.

Serlo's poems are in Latin, of which the most famous is Linquo coax ranis.

He is the subject of an 1899 essay by the French author Marcel Schwob, La légende de Serlon de Wilton.

== Bibliography ==
- Serlon de Wilton. Poèmes latins. Acta Universitatis Stockholmiensis, Studia Latina Stockholmiensia. Jan Öberg (ed.). Stockholm: Almqvist & Wiksell. 1965.
- Serlo of Savigny and Serlo of Wilton. Seven unpublished works. Cistercian Fathers. Lawrence C. Braceland (ed.), Lawrence C. Braceland (trans.). Kalamazoo, MI: Cistercian Publications. 1987. ISBN 978-0-87907-048-9.
- Raby, F.J.E. (1957). A history of secular Latin poetry in the Middle Ages (2 ed.). Oxford: Clarendon Press. ISBN 978-0-19-814325-3.
- Rigg, A.G. (1996). "Serlo of Wilton: Biographical notes". Medium Ævum. 65 (1): 96–101. doi:10.2307/43629790. ISSN 0025-8385. JSTOR 43629790.
- Thomson, Rodney M. (1999). "Serlo of Wilton and the schools of Oxford". Medium Ævum. 68 (1): 1–12. doi:10.2307/43630121. ISSN 0025-8385. JSTOR 43630121.
