= 2019 Bahraini protests =

2019 civil unrest in Bahrain

The 2019 protests in Bahrain was mass protests and civil unrest and popular disturbances that culminated into an uprising and violent demonstrations after mass protests against the executions by the authorities of 2 Shia men for terrorism-related charges in Bahrain in July 2019. Rioting erupted after thousands of civilians participated in popular rallies, marches, rioting, demonstrations, strikes, unrest, protests, picketing, clapping and chanting slogans against president and the Sunni-led regime, reviving the same demands of the 2011 Bahraini uprising. 1 was killed after two days of nonviolent protests after he inhaled Tear gas and canisters was fired directly at him in Manama from the Police. Protesters used placards, slogans and participated in civilian-led opposition strikes to the government. Demonstrations was suppressed on July 30. On the anniversary of the 2011 Bahraini uprising, nationwide protests occurred in support of the movement and held marches like they do annually. The unrest and movement would be the largest and bloodiest since the 2017 uprising.

== See also ==
- Bahrain Tamarod
- 2018–2024 Arab protests
