= Cahun =

Cahun is a surname. Notable people with the surname include:

- Carl Pontus Gahn (Cahun) (1759–1825) Swedish military officer
- Claude Cahun (1894–1954), French artist, photographer and writer
- David Léon Cahun (1841–1900), French traveler, Orientalist and writer
