= Maurice Schwob =

French publisher

Maurice Schwob (7 May 1859 – 30 March 1928) was a French publisher of the daily newspaper Le Phare de la Loire, based in Nantes. The newspaper had been sold to Maurice's father, Georges Schwob, in 1876 by Evariste Mangin.

He was born into a cultivated Jewish family. His father, George Schwob, was a friend of Théodore de Banville and Théophile Gautier. His mother, Mathilde Cahun, came from a family of intellectuals from Alsace. He was the brother of symbolist writer Marcel Schwob and the father of the surrealist writer and photographer Claude Cahun (born Lucy Schwob).
