= Syrian peasant revolt (1834–1835) =

- Part of the campaigns of Muhammad Ali of Egypt
- Map of Syria, Lebanon and Palestine, 1889.
Date	1834–1835 (1 year)
Location	Levant (then part of Egypt)
Result	Revolt suppressed

Belligerents
Egypt	Alawite clans Urban notables of: Nablus; Jerusalem; Hebron; Safed

Commanders and leaders
Muhammad Ali; Ibrahim Pasha; Salim Beg	Qasim al-Ahmad (executed); Mas'ud al-Madi (executed); Aqil Agha

Strength
36,000 soldiers	4,000 Alawite rebels Tens of thousands of irregulars

The Syrian peasant revolt of 1834–1835 was an armed uprising of Levantine peasant classes against the rule of Ibrahim Pasha of Egypt. The revolt took place in areas of Ottoman Syria, at the time, ruled by the semi-independent ruler of Egypt, who conquered the region from loyal Ottoman forces in 1831.

The main arena of the revolt evolved in the Damascus Eyalet - Jerusalem, Nablus and Hebron (Palestine or Southern Syria), as well as a major tribal Bedouin rebellion in Al-Karak (Transjordan); other peasant revolts also erupted in Sidon Eyalet - led by Muslims and Druze and encompassing Mount Lebanon, Hauran and Galilee; and a revolt in Aleppo Eyalet - led by Alawites of the Syrian coast. The cause of the revolts was mainly refusal of Syrian peasants to answer conscription and disarmament orders of new Egyptian rulers of the Muhammad Ali dynasty, in line with anti-Egyptian attitudes of local Ottoman loyalists.

== Background ==
The First Egyptian-Ottoman War (1831–1833) was a military conflict brought about by Muhammad Ali Pasha's demand to the Ottoman Empire for control of Greater Syria, as reward for his assistance in Crete against Greece. As a result, Muhammad Ali's forces temporarily gained control of Syria, and advanced as far north as Adana.

Muhammad Ali wanted Syria for a long time, and he knew that he would face enormous support within the country, in October 1831 the Egyptian army began to conquer Syria. Ibrahim Pasha (1789-1848), the son of Muhammad Ali, commanded a well-trained army, which easily defeated the Ottoman army. The army indeed did not face much armed resistance. The population was willing to cooperate unless the army harmed them personally.

The peace treaty, Kütahya, was signed by Muhammad Ali and the Sultan of the Ottoman Empire in May 1833. The Egyptians gained territory, within Greece and Syria. The Ottomans had good contacts with the local population because when they start to reconquer the area, the Syrians would help them. They provoked the population of Syria and supplied them with weapons so that they would rise against the Egyptians.

Muhammad wanted to conform the region to Western standards as he did with Egypt at the beginning of his rule. Economic, educational, administrational, and military reforms were introduced in the newly-conquered areas. The taxation on the locals doubled when the Egyptians took over control. Ibrahim Pasha fortified the Northern border and implied conscription, which was a new concept for the Syrians. Despite the reforms, for over a period of two years, things stayed relatively quiet.

== Arenas ==
=== Peasant revolts in Palestine and Transjordan ===
The Peasants' Revolt was a rebellion against Egyptian conscription and taxation policies in Palestine. It was a collective reaction to the gradual elimination of the unofficial rights and privileges previously enjoyed by the various societal groups in the region under Ottoman rule. While the local peasantry constituted the bulk of the rebel forces, urban notables and Bedouin tribes also formed an integral part of the revolt.

The Egyptians had a hard time conquering the Palestinian fellahin rebels, but when Muhammad Ali Pasha arrived with new troops, the revolt ended quickly. The rebelling peasants were punished severely, and the conscription and disarmament continued afterwards.

Women were absent in the military in this time period. In the many political and economic documents that are found, only a few women were included.

=== Alawite revolt ===
Between 1834 and 1835, Bashir's forces commanded by Khalil and his relatives participated in the suppression of revolts in Akkar, Safita, the Krak des Chevaliers and an Alawite revolt in the mountainous region of Latakia. The Alawite revolt is also known as the Nusayriyya revolt. Nusayris are the people who lived in the Nusayriyya Mountain.

Under the rule of the Ottomans, the Nusayris had the freedom to lead their community. When the Egyptians attacked Syria, the Nusayris joined the Ottomans to fight them. The Egyptians won the fight, and for two years things stayed tranquil.

Things changed in September 1834, Muhammad Ali ordered disarmament and mass conscription in the area. Which he knew would cause unrest, but he felt that he had no choice. The peace treaty that he signed with the Ottoman sultan was more of a temporary ceasefire, so Muhammad needed troops to protect the border.

The Nusayris had a different kind of warfare than the Egyptians were used to, they acted sporadically and not united, known as the guerilla technique. The Nasayris felt that the Egyptians were weak and decided to attack the city of Latakia. The Nusayris won, but the Egyptians reconquered Latakia and the Nusayris fled back to their mountains. The Egyptians were not known to the Mountainous landscape, and the guerilla warfare, which disadvantaged them, but with the help of the Druze they managed to overmaster the Nusayris. The Ottomans, who remained to have contact with the Nusayris, told them to continue the revolt and that they would assist them. Their assistance nevertheless never came.

== See also ==
- 1838 Druze revolt
- Egyptian-Ottoman War (1839-1841)
