= 2011–2012 Tunisian protests =

The 2011–2012 Tunisia protests was a series of increasingly violent street demonstrations characterised by popular unrest and civil riots against economic grievances and deteriorating conditions in Tunisia. Inequality and unemployment has also been a trigger of nationwide civil disorder and massive disobedience. The fresh protests first began as a wave of national peaceful protests on 14–21 January against the government and demanded a civilian government and fresh elections to be held immediately. Instead, the interim government has led the 2011 Tunisian presidential election. But the protests adapted to different towns and regions, and mass demonstrations re-erupted nationwide. In 2012, massive labour strikes and anti-government riots have been ongoing, with police brutality becoming violent and more extreme. Women strikes and hunger strikes had been held nationwide in August–September. University students also led national student protests in protest at economic conditions. Nationwide protests against the government and Police brutality led by youths had been held in Tunis, Sousse and Gafsa and poor neighbourhoods in cities nationwide in November–December. 8 were killed in the mass uprising and political movement. Insurrectional demonstrations continued and ultimately led to the 2013–2014 Tunisian political crisis.

== See also ==
- 2013–2014 Tunisian political crisis
- Tunisian Revolution
