= Alawite revolt (1834–1835) =

Part of the Syrian peasant revolt

- Part of Syrian peasant revolt
Date	1834–1835 (1 year)
Location	Akkar, Krak des Chevaliers, in Aleppo Eyalet (Ottoman Syria)
Result	Revolt suppressed: Egyptian rule restored

Belligerents
Egypt Eyalet: Emir Bashir's Christian forces	Alawite clans

Commanders and leaders
Salim Beg (Governor of Homs); Emir Bashir; Amir Khalil	Unknown Leader (executed)

Strength
10,000	4,000 (1834)

Casualties and losses
500 Druze captured and executed	Unknown

The Alawite revolt, also known as the Nusayri rebellion, was one of the arenas of the Syrian Peasant Revolt (1834–1835). Between 1834 and 1835, the Alawites (Nusayris) rose up against Egyptian rule of the region, while pro-Egyptian governor of Homs Salim Beg and the forces of Emir Bashir Shihab II of the Mount Lebanon Emirate, commanded by Khalil and his relatives, participated in the suppression of revolts in Akkar, Safita, the Krak des Chevaliers and an Alawite revolt in the mountainous region of Latakia.

== Background ==
The Ottoman Empire oppressed the Alawites, attempting to convert them to Sunni Islam. The Alawis rose up against the Ottomans on several occasions, and maintained their autonomy in their mountains. On the other hand, the Ottomans also recognized the Alawis as a distinct tax-paying group and tried to develop the Syrian coastal region economically in the sixteenth century. In the eighteenth century the Ottomans recognized numerous local Alawi notable families as tax farmers.

In 1833, the Syrian provinces were ceded to Muhammed Ali of Egypt in the Convention of Kutahya. The firman stated that

"The governments of Candia and Egypt are continued to Mahomet Ali. And in reference to his special claim, I have granted him the provinces of Damascus, Tripoli-in-Syria, Sidon, Saphet, Aleppo, the districts of Jerusalem and Nablous, with the conduct of pilgrims and the commandment of the Tcherde (the yearly offering to the tomb of the Prophet). His son, Ibrahim Pacha, has again the title of Sheikh and Harem of Mekka, and the district of Jedda; and farther, I have acquiesced in his request to have the district of Adana ruled by the Treasury of Taurus, with the title of Mohassil."

The policy of disarmament and the call for mass conscription by Muhammad Ali of Egypt caused many revolts in different part of Syria, such as Aleppo, Damascus, Tripoli, Beirut, Antioch, and Kilis. The main revolts occurred in three places; Jerusalem, mainly in Jabal Nablus in May 1834; among the Nusayris in Latakia and the Nusayri Mountains in September 1834; and among the Druzes in Mount Lebanon in 1835. There was also a revolt among the Kurdish population of the Antioch region, which may have been collaborating with the Alawis. According to Talhamy, the Alawites were still loyal to the central Ottoman rule, and refrained from the Egyptian rule.

== Timeline ==
The first offensive attack of the Nusayris upon the Egyptians took place in 1834, when 4,000 Alawite militants attacked Egyptian soldiers who were marching from Aleppo to Latakia. The attack caused the loss of half of the Egyptian soldiers and forced them to retreat to Latakia. The Nusayris then attacked Latakia and destroyed government buildings, laid siege to the house of the Mutasallim Antepli Said Agha, captured the land tax money, the houses of the Mutasallim and some belongings of the soldiers, while freeing Nusayri prisoners. The Alawis were in particular able to defeat an Egyptian column at Bahluliye in the mountains.

1879 French map of the Syrian Coastal Mountain Range, here called the "Mountains of the Ansaris", by Léon Cahun

In the meanwhile, the conscription and disarmament policies of the Egyptian viceroy were applied to the area of Tripoli by the governor of Homs and commander of the Egyptian artillery corps Salim Beg. Having a partial success in policy implementation due to withdrawal of many armed Alawite men to the mountains, Salim Beg discovered the hiding place of the Nusayri rebels the help of his agents, and attacked them. This attack led to the defeat of the Nusayri rebels and at the end of the raid, many weapons and flocks of sheep were captured, the Nusayri leaders were executed, several Nusayri rebels were captured and later conscripted, and the villages of the Nusayris burnt to punish the entire people and discourage other Nusayris from resisting.

When Ibrahim Pasha was informed about the Nusayri attacks on his troops in Latakia, he ordered Salim Beg to move from Tripoli to the region. As soon as the rebels heard of the arrival of Salim Beg's forces, they fled Latakia towards the Nusayri Mountains. Many of them were killed by the Egyptians and five leaders of the community were taken to prison. Salim Beg attacked al-Mreqib and the contiguous villages, including al-Khawabi, Qadmus, and Sultan Ibrahim where many weapons were obtained. However the Egyptians did not gain total control of the mountains.

Then, Ibrahim Pasha of Egypt asked his allies in the region to provide him with more soldiers that were skilled in fighting in the rocky mountains. Significant forces were sent to the Nusayri mountains under the leadership Amir Khalil, son of Emir Bashir Shihab II, Mehmed Ali's ally in Syria. With the arrival of Khalil's troops, the size of the Egyptian army reached 10,000 soldiers. Initially, the Egyptian campaign began with a disaster - the Nusayris captured five hundred Druzes who had been sent to the region and killed all of them near al-Murayqib. In October 1834, a spy report from the region that is held in the Ottoman archives in Istanbul suggested that the Ottomans could reconquer the entire region with the Alawis' help. However, with the help of the new troops, Salim Beg subjugated the region within a week, and forced the Nusayris of the northern part of the mountain to accept his authority after disarming them and destroying several of their villages.

The Nusayri uprising lasted until mid-April 1835, as the Ottomans neither came to help nor sent sufficient material to strengthen the Nusayri resistance against the Egyptian rule. After eight months of continuous conflict, the Nusayris were disarmed and conscripted. Some local resistance continued in the mountains until 1838.

== Aftermath ==
Alawites waiting in ambush for Ottoman soldiers, from the 1879 travelogue of Léon Cahun

After subduing the rebellion, Ibrahim Pasha ordered the arrest of every Alawite rebel in order to control their suitability for the army, and to collect their weapons - around 4,000 Alawites were conscripted and many of them were forced to leave the mountains. In addition, the Egyptians destroyed their villages and wells, cut down fruit trees and pillaged. Talhamy states that during the uprising, the Egyptian soldiers enslaved some Alawite women. They adopted the fatwa of al-Mugrabi that was issued in the 1820s that allowed the enslavement of the Alawites. However, the Egyptian commanders themselves prohibited this practice and punished the soldiers who engaged in it.

During the late Ottoman era, between 1840 and 1880, tensions between the authorities and the Alawite tribes of the coastal mountains increased sharply. In 1854 the Ottoman governor of the Latakia Sanjak ("Latakia District") was killed in armed confrontation between the authorities and members of the Qardaha-based tribe. This emboldened the Kalbiyya fighters, who proceeded to launch more raids against Ottoman positions, which the authorities responded to harshly. In the later nineteenth century, however, the Ottoman state built numerous schools in the region and allowed Alawites to serve on the municipal council (Meclis-i Idare) in Latakia.

== See also ==
- 1838 Druze revolt
- Alawite revolt of 1919
