= 2018–2024 Arab protests =

Wave of protests in the Arab world

- Part of the aftermath of the Arab Spring and the Arab Winter
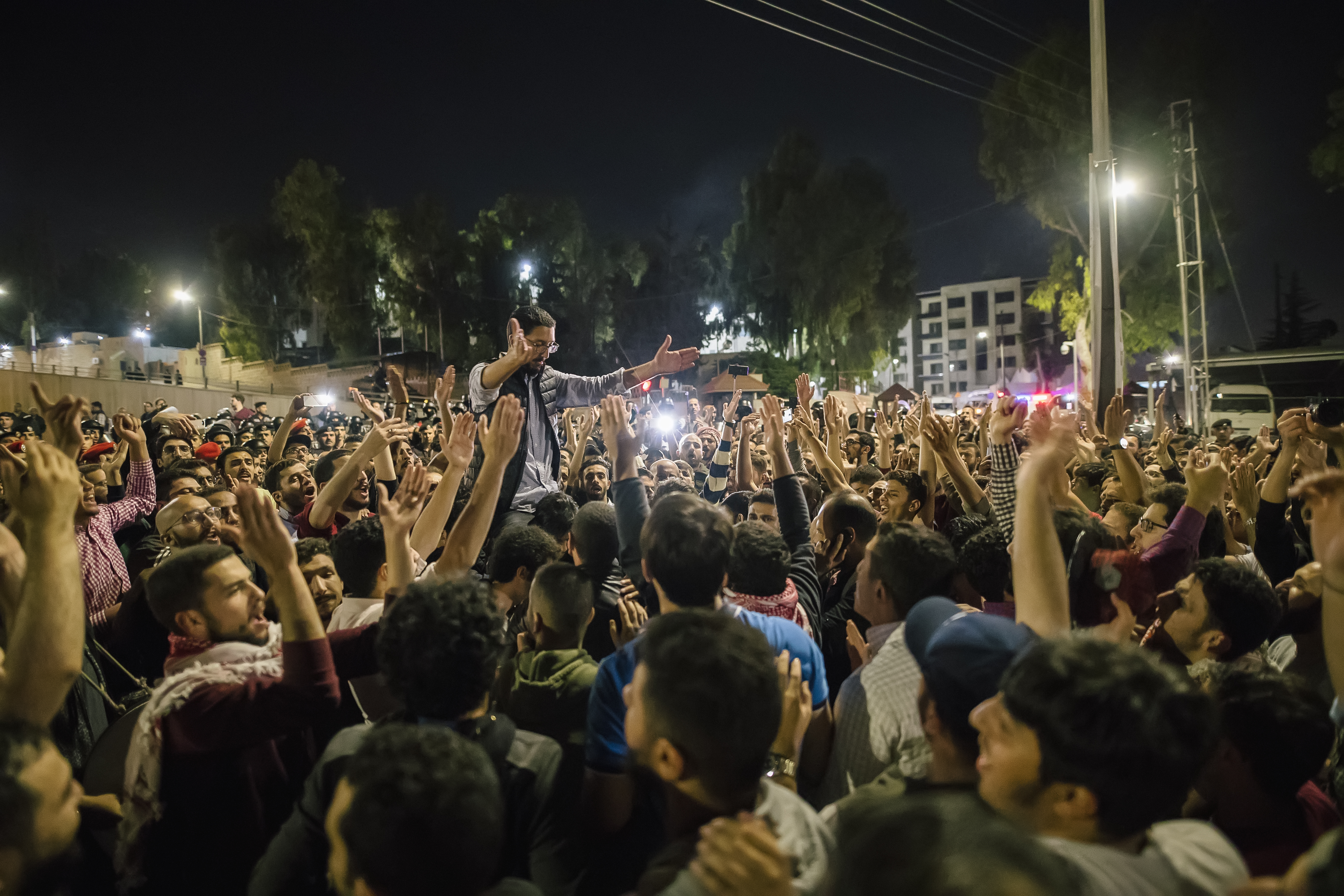
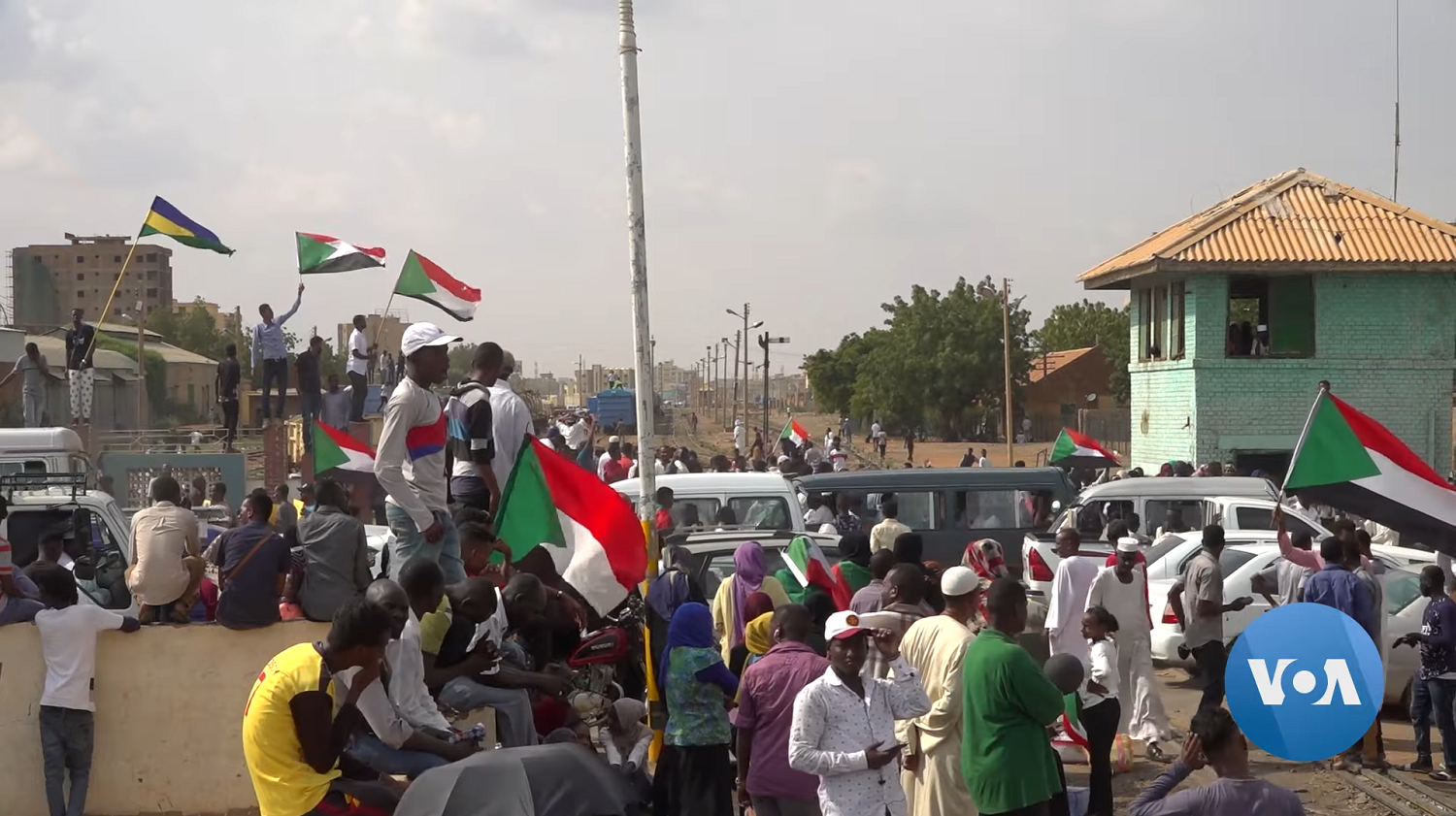
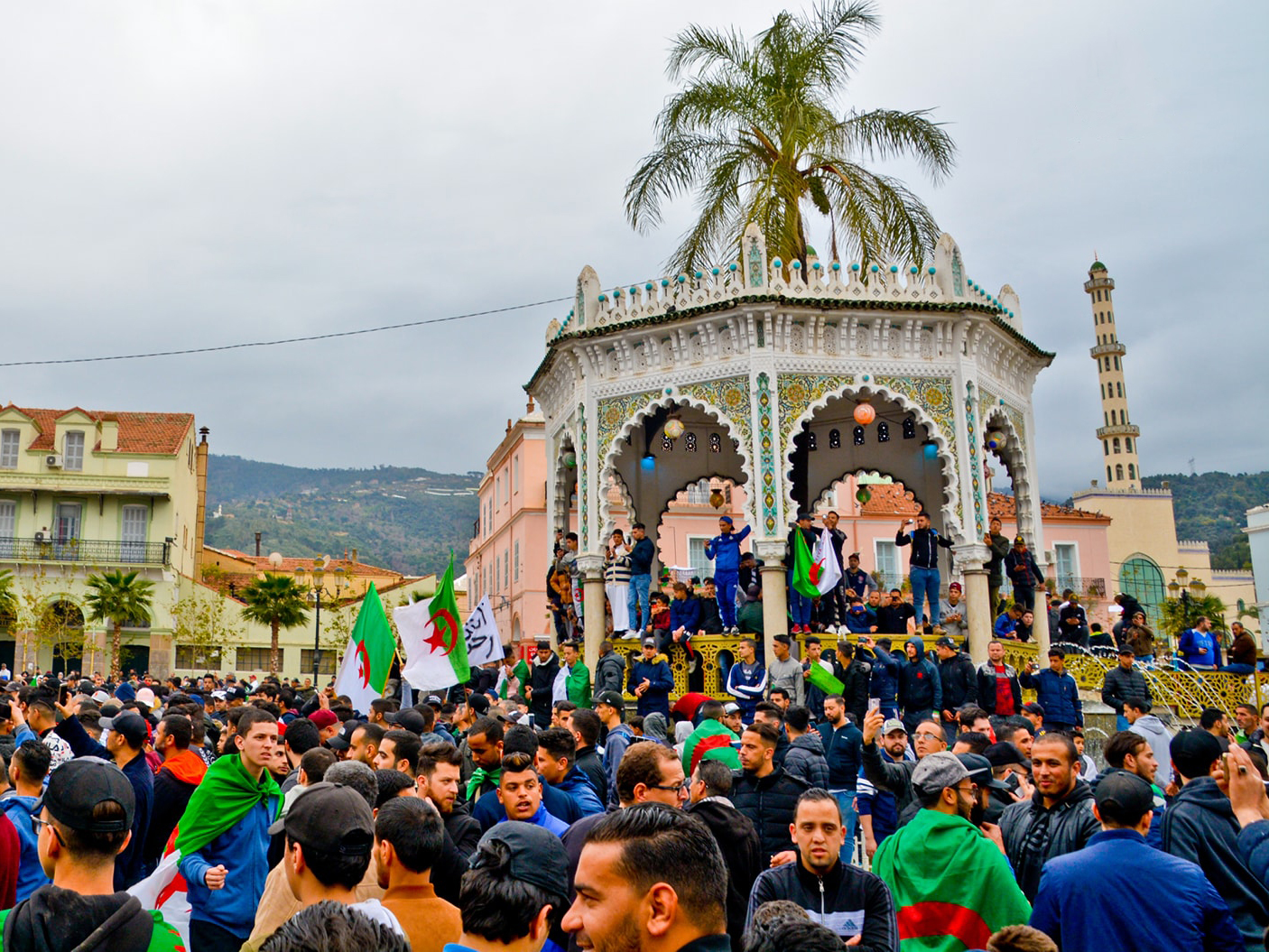
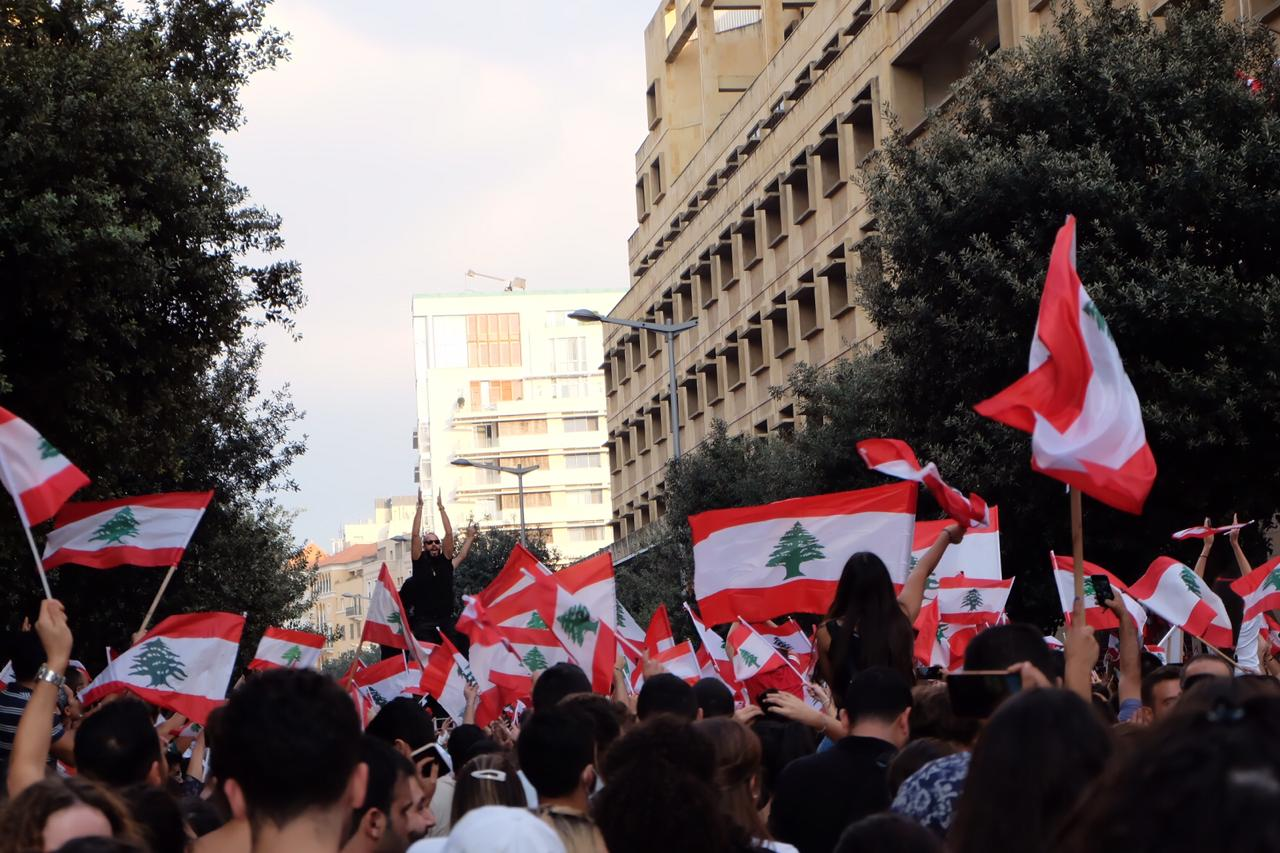
- Jordan Sudan Algeria Lebanon
- Date: 1 January 2018 – 8 December 2024 (6 years, 11 months and 1 week)
- Location: Arab League countries in North Africa, Central Africa and Middle East (i.e. MENA)
- Caused by: Authoritarianism; Energy crisis; Human rights violations; Inflation; Kleptocracy; Political corruption; Poor basic services; Poverty; Sectarianism (Lebanon and Iraq); State terrorism; Unemployment
- Goals: Democracy; Economic equality; Employment; Free elections; Freedom of religion; Human rights; Nationalism; Regime change
- Methods: Civil resistance; Civil war; Demonstrations; Insurgency; Internet activism; Labor strike; Mutiny; Protests; Rebellion; Riots; Self-immolation
- Status: Full result by country: Tunisia: 2018 budget repealed.; Sudan: President Omar al-Bashir ousted, arrested, charged, government overthrown. Transitional authority established, but later modified by a coup, eventually leading to a civil war.; Algeria: President Abdelaziz Bouteflika resigns, government overthrown. Presidential elections were delayed until December 2019. Pro-establishment Abdelmadjid Tebboune elected as new president. Algerian politics still dominated by the military elite.; Palestine and Egypt: Protests suppressed.; Jordan: Hani Mulki's government resigns, Omar Razzaz forms new government. Controversial tax bill withdrawn for further discussion.; Iraq: Pro-Western prime minister Haider al-Abadi defeated in parliamentary elections and pro-Iran government led by Adil Abdul-Mahdi elected. Abdul-Mahdi's government resigns in November 2019 following protests against Iran's growing influence in Iraqi politics. Mustafa Al-Kadhimi appointed as new prime minister. Early elections held in October 2021.; Lebanon: Prime Ministers Saad Hariri and Hassan Diab resign. Najib Mikati appointed as prime minister on 10 September 2021.; Syria: Prime Minister Imad Khamis sacked. Assad regime falls in December 2024 after a series of opposition offensives.

The 2018–2024 Arab protests, also referred to as the Second Arab Spring, (Note: For other names, See #Names) were a series of anti-government protests which began in several Arab world countries in 2018.

In Iraq, the deadliest incident of civil unrest since the fall of Saddam Hussein resulted in its prime minister Adil Abdul-Mahdi being replaced.

Sustained civil disobedience in Sudan resulted in the overthrow of president Omar al-Bashir in a military coup d'état, the Khartoum massacre, and the transfer of power from a military junta to the Transitional Sovereignty Council but led to a civil war in 2023.

In Algeria, a series of mass protests resulted in the resignation of president Abdelaziz Bouteflika, and the postponement of the scheduled presidential election. Other protests also took place in Egypt, Jordan, Lebanon, Morocco, Syria, and Tunisia, along with economic protests in the Gaza Strip.

== Context and background ==
Tesbih Habbal and Muzna Hasnawi, Syrian editors writing in The Nation in October 2019, argued that the sustained street protests in the Arab world since 2018 constituted a second wave of the process that started with the 2010–2011 Arab Spring. Syrian protestors in October 2019 held signs stating, "Syria—Egypt—Iraq: You've revived the spirit of the Arab people, from the [Atlantic] Ocean to the [Persian] Gulf!" Habbal and Hansawi described the process as having "profoundly changed the political consciousness of the region", overcoming fear of political activity and "setting a crucial precedent for challenging the persistence of authoritarianism". Habbal and Hansawi argued that the October 2019 protests in Syria "[proved] that even ruthless repression and tyranny cannot deter the resistance."

Habbal and Hansawi argued that the new wave of protests frequently included usage of the early Arab Spring slogan "Ash-shab yurid isqat an-nizam" (The people want the fall of the regime). The protests were often described as being inherently "anti-systemic" covering the entirety of the political establishment rather than opposition to a single policy; fueling this is large scale unemployment (specifically youth unemployment), as well as frustration towards many government policies, reliance on international aid for basic necessities, corruption and reliance of hydrocarbons (fossil fuels), which all led to discontent towards the often cronyistic system widely in use in Middle Eastern countries.

=== Names ===
The alternative names "second Arab Spring", "new Arab Spring" and "Arab Summer" refer to a similarity with the preceding Arab Spring wave of pro-democracy protests which took place in the early 2010s. However, in this wave of protests "the similarities and differences suggest more an upgrading than a replay of the Arab Spring." The wider call for democracy and human rights was replaced by more day-to-day demands, on issues including excessive costs of living and high unemployment rates.

== Timeline by country ==
=== Morocco ===
The 2017–2018 Moroccan protests began in Jerada in eastern Morocco following the deaths of two miners, with protesters decrying poor standards of living. While the country was mainly spared from the violence seen in other Arab countries, it still occasionally saw socioeconomic and anti-corruption demonstrations. Methods of protesting included mostly young ultras chanting political slogans at Moroccan soccer club stadiums.

Socioeconomic conditions continued to deteriorate as a result of the COVID-19 pandemic. In February 2021, protests in Fnideq against the closure of the borders with Ceuta and Melilla were suppressed by police, with authorities claiming that the protests violated the state of health emergency imposed in response to the pandemic. In July 2021, local authorities in Sidi Bennour confiscated a food cart belonging to a 25-year-old man, Yassine Lekhmidi, as he wasn't wearing a face mask. He paid a fine, but the police did not return his cart. As a result, Lekhmidi self-immolated in an act of protest and died of his injuries on 6 August. His death led to demonstrations in Sidi Bennour which garnered nationwide attention, but otherwise failed to make any significant changes in the political landscape.

=== Jordan ===
The 2018 Jordanian protests started as a general strike organized by more than 30 trade unions on 31 May 2018 after the government of Hani Mulki submitted a new tax law to Parliament. The bill followed IMF-backed austerity measures adopted by Mulki's government since 2016 that aimed to tackle Jordan's growing public debt. Although Jordan had been relatively unscathed from the violence that swept the region following the 2011 Arab Spring, its economy had taken a hit from the surrounding turmoil and from an influx of a large number of Syrian refugees into the country. Jordan also hosts a large contingent of Iraqi and Palestinian refugees, further straining its finances. The UNHCR places Jordan as the world's second largest host of refugees per capita.

The day following the strike on the 31st of May, the government raised fuel and electricity prices responding to an increase in international oil prices. This led to crowds of protesters pouring onto the 4th circle in Amman, near the Prime Ministry's offices that night. Other Jordanians also gathered across the country in protest of the measure in unprecedented large numbers. On the 1st of June King Abdullah intervened and ordered the freeze of the price hikes; the government acquiesced but said the decision would cost the treasury $20 million. The protests continued for four days until Mulki submitted his resignation to the King on the 4th of June, and Omar Razzaz, his Education Minister, became prime minister. Protests only ceased after Razzaz announced his intention of withdrawing the new tax bill.

The protests have not been led by traditional opposition groups like the Muslim Brotherhood or leftists but by diverse crowds from the middle and poor classes. Although some protesters set aflame tires and blocked roads multiple nights, protests were largely peaceful and few casualties were reported. They were staged after daylight hours as it was during the month of Ramadan.

=== Tunisia ===
The 2018 Tunisian protests were a series of protests occurring throughout Tunisia. Beginning January 2018, protests erupted in multiple towns and cities across Tunisia over issues related to the cost of living and taxes. As of 9 January, the demonstrations had claimed at least one life, and revived worries about the fragile political situation in Tunisia.

The Popular Front, an alliance of leftist opposition parties, called for continued protests against the government's "unjust" austerity measures while Tunisian Prime Minister Youssef Chahed denounced the violence and called for calm, claiming that he and his government believe 2018 "would be the last difficult year for Tunisians".

A new series of protests started on 15 January 2021, amidst the 10th anniversary of the Tunisian Revolution. Thousands rioted in cities and towns across Tunisia, which saw looting, arson, as well as mass deployment of police and army in several cities and the arrests of hundreds of people.

After 7 months of discontinuous protests, on 25 July, President Kais Saied sacked the prime minister and froze the parliament which resulted in a political crisis.

=== Iraq ===
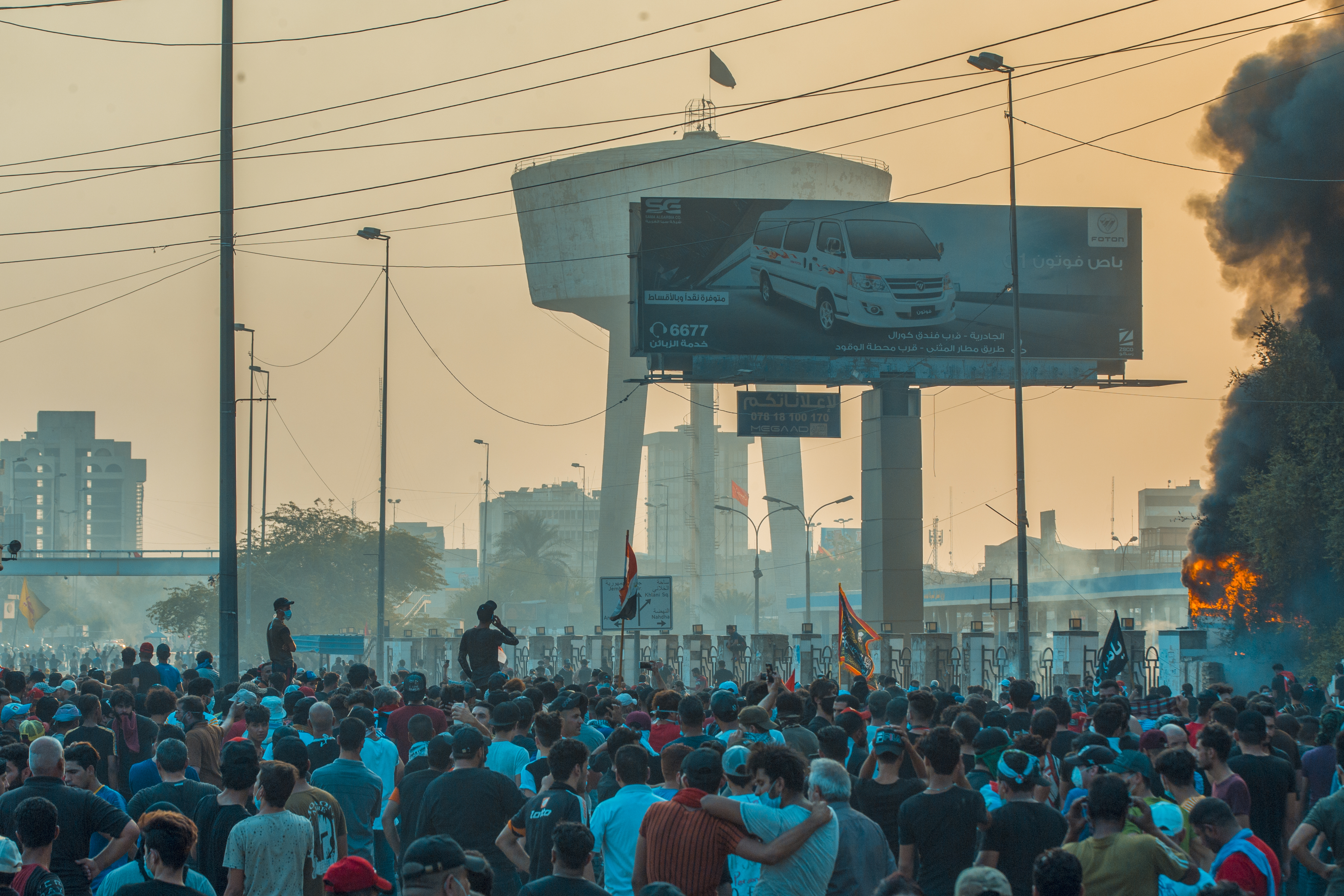
2 October 2019 in Iraq

The 2018–2019 Iraqi protests over deteriorating economic conditions and state corruption started in July 2018 in Baghdad and other major Iraqi cities, mainly in the central and southern provinces. During the nationwide protests erupting in October 2019, Iraqi security forces killed over 500 people and over 27,000 have been injured, leading Iraq's president Barham Salih to call the actions of security forces "unacceptable". Some police have also been killed in the protests. The protests are the deadliest unrest in Iraq since the fall of Saddam Hussein, with the death toll reaching 511 by 2 January 2020 and 669 by 13 January 2020.

=== Algeria ===
The 2019 Algerian protests, also called Revolution of Smiles or Hirak Movement, began on 16 February 2019, ten days after Abdelaziz Bouteflika announced his candidacy for a fifth presidential term in a signed statement. These protests, without precedent since the Algerian Civil War, have been peaceful and led the military to insist on Bouteflika's immediate resignation, which took place on 2 April 2019. By early May, a significant number of power-brokers close to the deposed administration, including the former president's younger brother Saïd, had been arrested.

=== Egypt ===
The 2019 Egyptian protests consisted of protests by thousands of people in Cairo, Alexandria, Damietta and five other Egyptian cities starting on 20 and 21 September 2019 in which the protestors called for President of Egypt Abdel Fattah el-Sisi to be removed from power. Security forces responded with tear gas, rubber bullets and live bullets and, as of 6 October 2019, 3000 arrests had been made, based on data from the Egyptian Center for Economic and Social Rights, the Egyptian Commission for Rights and Freedoms and the Arabic Network for Human Rights Information. Prominent arrestees included human rights lawyer Mahienour el-Massry, journalist and former leader of the Constitution Party Khaled Dawoud and two professors of political science at Cairo University, Hazem Hosny and Hassan Nafaa. The wave of arrests was the biggest in Egypt since Sisi formally became president in 2014. Human Rights Watch called for all those arrested for peacefully expressing their opinions to be released immediately. Amnesty International described the Sisi government being "shaken to its core" by 20–21 September protests and that the authorities had "launched a full-throttle clampdown to crush demonstrations and intimidate activists, journalists and others into silence".

Two thousand people, including Sudanese Professionals Association (SPA) representatives, protested in Khartoum on 26 September in support of Waleed Abdelrahman Hassan, a Sudanese anti-Islamist student detained by Egyptian authorities, who gave a forced confession on MBC Masr television. The SPA stated, "the era when Sudanese citizens were humiliated inside or outside their country has gone and will never return". The Sudanese Foreign Ministry summoned the Egyptian ambassador and Waleed Abdelrahman Hassan was freed on 2 October 2019.

On the evening of 2 October, during the lead up to the 2023 Egyptian presidential election, a Nation's Future Party rally in Mersa Matruh turned into anti-Sisi protests, with protesters burning photos of him and chanting anti-Sisi slogans.

=== Palestine ===
A series of economic protests in Gaza began in February 2019, and it was initiated with the popular calls "We want to live" and "Revolt of the hungry" by groups of civilians and activists. The group has been nicknamed the 14 March movement.

The protests aim at the overall dire conditions of living in the Gaza Strip. Half of the 2 million residents live in poverty. Civilians claimed that the nonviolent protests were not meant to threaten the current ruling power, but rather asking to improve social and economic conditions. Among their requests, one is to strengthen labour organizations to safeguard workers’ rights, ease taxes, reduce the extremely high costs of living, and establish check and balance mechanisms to contrast corruption within the private sector. The majority of the protestors were young people who cried out about the urgency of labour reforms. According to the World Bank, Gaza's economic conditions are in decline every year, with a rate of youth unemployment of 70 percent.

Over the previous decade, Gazans were already dependent on external humanitarian aid. The already difficult situation owing to internal mismanagement also worsened due to US President Donald Trump's "drastic cuts to US-funded Palestinian aid programme", the continued wars initiated by Hamas and the Palestinian Islamic Jihad against Israel and subsequent disproportional Israeli responses, and the lack of support from the Palestinian Authority.

The peaceful protests were brutally crushed by the ruling Hamas, which dispatched security forces to disperse people. The neutralization by Hamas saw a spillover of violence: there have been reports of armed patrols breaking into people's homes, mass arrests and beatings in Gaza City, Jabaliya refugee camp, Deir al-Balah, Khan Yunis and Rafah. Although there are no killings recorded, over 1000 people got threatened, beaten, and detained. Journalists, photographers and activists were forbidden to cover the manifestation. Local correspondents who were able to document parts of the protests have been assaulted by Hamas officers.

Numerous political organisations and human rights groups condemned the aggressive repression by the hand of Hamas security forces to the nonviolent demonstrations. The Palestinian Center for Human Rights denounced their actions as "a crime and violation according to the national and international laws", and urged the security forces to "respect the right to peaceful assembly and right to freedom of expression". Human Rights Watch reported that "Hamas authorities routinely arrest and torture peaceful critics and opponents with impunity." Amnesty International called for a "thorough and transparent investigation into the unnecessary and excessive use of force, arbitrary arrest and detention, and torture and other ill-treatment by security forces." Supporting groups of the demonstrators directed attention to a number of domestic political issues that worsened since the Israeli and Egyptian blockade in 2007 and the takeover of Hamas. Among those, the rivalry between Hamas and Fatah resulted in the failure to assure stability and security, notwithstanding the financial pressure put on by the Palestinian Authority.

The Hamas-led government responded with apologies on behalf of the security forces for the attacks on Palestinians and condemned their conduct. The protests were described as a moment that shook Hamas' authority since their takeover in 2007.

In June and July 2021, Palestinian civilians in the West Bank staged anti-government protests against Fatah, including Mahmoud Abbas, due to their perceived passiveness in the conflict with Israel.

In late July 2023, protesters against the Hamas government rose up once more, however due to the inaccessibility of the strip and the subsequent government crackdown, the scale of the protests was unknown and may have been a larger demonstration than the protests in 2019.

=== Lebanon ===
The Lebanese protests were a series of protests that constituted a reaction against sectarian rule, stagnant economy, unemployment, endemic corruption in the public sector, legislation (such as banking secrecy) that is perceived to shield the ruling class from accountability. It is suspected that the direct trigger to the protests were due to the planned imposed taxes on gasoline, tobacco and online phone calls such as through WhatsApp, as protests started breaking out right after unanimous Cabinet approval of the WhatsApp taxes, due to be ratified by 22 October.

In contrast to the 2005 Cedar Revolution, and similarly to a process started in the 2015–2016 Lebanese protests, the 2019 protests were non-sectarian, crossing the Sunni–Shia Muslim / Christian sociological and religious divide and bypassing traditional political party alignments.

=== Oman ===
The 2018–2019 Omani protests were nationwide protests and rallies in which tens of thousands of protesters marched against skyrocketing unemployment and inflation in the Sultanate of Oman. Over a 13-month period between January 2018 and January 2019, Omani citizens went out into the streets on several occasions to rally against decisions made by their government, whilst demanding more employment opportunities as well as economic reforms.

Protests erupted in Omani capital Muscat outside the Ministry of Manpower on 22 January 2018. Demonstrations spread rapidly across the country, reaching other major cities such as Salalah, Sohar and Sur. Numerous people were reportedly arrested. In response, the Omani government announced that it would create 25 thousand public service jobs to accommodate protesters’ demands.

At the end of 2018 and into January 2019, mass protests resurfaced in Oman. Thousands of protesters rallied against economic hardship and once again requested more job opportunities. Demonstrations were oppressed by riot police, causing dozens of people to be arrested. The demonstrations triggered a swift response by the Omani government. On 6 January, the Omani government announced that it would establish a new body to alleviate the employment-crisis. The so-called National Center for Employment was created to help Omanis to navigate the national labor market. As a result, protests and strikes came to an end on 9 January 2019.

=== Libya ===
Street protests took place in August and September 2020 over issues of poor provision of services in several cities in Libya, including both cities controlled by the Government of National Accord (GNA) in the west (Tripoli, Misrata, Zawiya) and by the Libyan National Army (LNA) in the east of Libya (Benghazi). The de facto LNA-associated government led by Abdullah al-Thani offered its resignation on 13 September 2020 in response to the protests.

Strikes against power cuts saw hundreds attend on 29–30 October. It was met with tear gas and plastic bullets and riots were met with rubber bullets. Riots occurred on 29 October by workers and ended violently with clashes. On 31 October 2020, Fayez al-Sarraj rescinded his decision to resign. Elections were scheduled to be held on 24 December 2021 but was postponed after the head of High National Election Commission (HNEC) ordered the dissolution of the electoral committees nationwide. Elections are indefinitely postponed.

=== Sudan ===
The Sudanese revolution was a major shift of political power in Sudan which began with street protests throughout Sudan on 19 December 2018 and continued with sustained civil disobedience for about eight months, during which the 2019 Sudanese coup d'état deposed President Omar al-Bashir after thirty years in power, the Khartoum massacre took place under the leadership of the Transitional Military Council (TMC) that replaced al-Bashir, and in July and August 2019 the TMC and the Forces of Freedom and Change alliance (FFC) signed a Political Agreement and a Draft Constitutional Declaration legally defining a planned 39-month phase of transitional state institutions and procedures to return Sudan to a civilian democracy. In August and September 2019, the TMC formally transferred executive power to a mixed military–civilian collective head of state, the Sovereignty Council of Sudan, and to a civilian prime minister (Abdalla Hamdok) and a mostly civilian cabinet, while judicial power was transferred to Nemat Abdullah Khair, Sudan's first female Chief Justice. Street protests continued during the 39-month planned transitionary institution period.

=== Syria ===
In southwest Syria in June 2020, worsening economic conditions led to rare anti-government protests in the city of Suweida, where demonstrators called for the removal of President Bashar al-Assad, as well as the withdrawal of Iran-backed militias and Russian troops from the region. The protests led Assad to dismiss Prime Minister Imad Khamis. In addition, counter-demonstrations in support of the Assad government were also held. Both Amnesty International and Human Rights Watch condemned the use of "arbitrary detentions", beatings and arrests by Syrian security forces, and called on the government to "immediately release" those detained.

== Summary of conflicts by country ==
| Country | Date started | Status of protests | Outcome | Death toll | Situation |
|---|---|---|---|---|---|
| Tunisia | 1 January 2018 | Ended in February 2018 | 2018 budget repealed | 2 | 2018 Tunisian protests; 2021 Tunisian protests |
| Jordan | 30 May 2018 | Ended on 7 June 2018 | Prime Minister Hani Mulki resigns and is replaced with Omar Razzaz: Tax bill withdrawn | | 2018 Jordanian protests |
| Iraq | 16 July 2018 | Ended on 18 July 2021 | Resignation of the Iraqi Prime minister Adil Abdul-Mahdi (remained as caretaker for two months) | 669 | 2015–2018 Iraqi protests; 2019–2021 Iraqi protests |
| Sudan | 19 December 2018 | Ended on 10 June 2021 | Ousting of Omar al-Bashir in a military coup d'état: April 2019: Seizure of power by Transitional Military Council; June 2019: Khartoum massacre; September 2019: Executive power transferred to military–civilian Sovereignty Council and civilian Prime Minister Abdalla Hamdok; October 2019: Judicial power transferred to Chief Justice Nemat Khair | 246 | Sudanese Revolution; Transitionary period protests; Sudanese civil war (2023–present) |
| Algeria | 16 February 2019 | Ended on 28 April 2021 | Resignation of Abdelaziz Bouteflika under pressure added by the military | 3 | 2019–2021 Algerian protests; 2021 Algerian protests |
| Palestine | 14 March 2019 | Ended on 18 March 2019 | Protests repressed by Hamas security forces | | 2019 Gaza economic protests |
| Palestine | 24 June 2021 | Ended on 7 July 2021 | Protests repressed by Fatah security forces | | 2021 Palestinian protests (West Bank) |
| Palestine | 30 July 2023 | Ended on 7 August 2023 | Protests repressed by Hamas security forces | 1+ | 2023 Gaza economic protests |
| Egypt | 20 September 2019 | Protests ended on 27 September 2019; prisoners unreleased as of November 2019 | Protests repressed by Egyptian government and authorities | | 2019 Egyptian protests |
| Lebanon | 17 October 2019 | 2021 | Prime Ministers Saad Hariri and Hassan Diab resign. New cabinet formed by Najib Mikati on 10 September 2021 | 11 | 17 October Revolution |
| Oman | 22 January 2018 | Ended on 9 January 2019 | Economic reforms by Sultan Qaboos | | 2018–2019 Omani protests |
| Syria | 7 June 2020 | Ended on 15 June 2020 | Sacking of Prime Minister Imad Khamis | | 2020 Suweida protests |
| Syria | 17 August 2023 | Ended on 8 December 2024 | 2024 Syrian opposition offensives leading to fall of the Assad regime | 1 | Southern Syria protests (2023–24) |
| Total death toll and other consequences: | | | | 928+ (combined estimate) | 2 heads of state and 3 heads of government left office as part of the events. (Note: Count excludes ousted short-term leaders: Ahmed Awad Ibn Auf in Sudan quit after one day, and Abdel Fattah al-Burhan led the military-only TMC in Sudan and later became the chair of the mixed civilian–military Sovereignty Council of Sudan that replaced the TMC.) |

== See also ==
- 2019 Bahraini protests
- 2019 Sudanese coup d'état
- 2019–2020 Iranian protests
- Hirak (Algeria)
- 2020s in politics
- 2021 Tunisian self-coup
- Arab Revolt (disambiguation)
- Arab Spring
- Arab Winter
- Hirak Rif Movement
- Middle Eastern crisis (2023–present)
- List of protests in the 21st century
- 2025 Gaza Strip anti-Hamas protests
