= Stefan Mrożewski =

Polish painter

- Born: 12 April 1894; Częstochowa, Poland
- Died: 8 September 1975 (aged 81); Walnut Creek, California, United States
- Occupation: Painter

Stefan Mrożewski (12 April 1894 – 8 September 1975) was a Polish painter. His work was part of the painting event in the art competition at the 1936 Summer Olympics. His work included wood engravings, book illustrations, portraits and town landscapes.
