= Cœur double =

Collection of short stories by Marcel Schwob

Double Heart
- Author: Marcel Schwob
- Original title: Cœur double
- Language: French
- Publisher: Ollendorff
- Publication date: July 1891
- Publication place: Paris, France

Cœur double ("Double Heart") is the first collection of short stories by the French author Marcel Schwob. The book was published by Ollendorff in Paris in July 1891, and was dedicated to Robert Louis Stevenson, a powerful influence on Schwob's work. With its evocative language and its combination of sensual and macabre elements it attracted the admiration of many reviewers, including Anatole France, and, initially, a small circle of readers.

The stories were originally published individually in newspapers, especially L’Écho de Paris.
