= Léon Cahun =

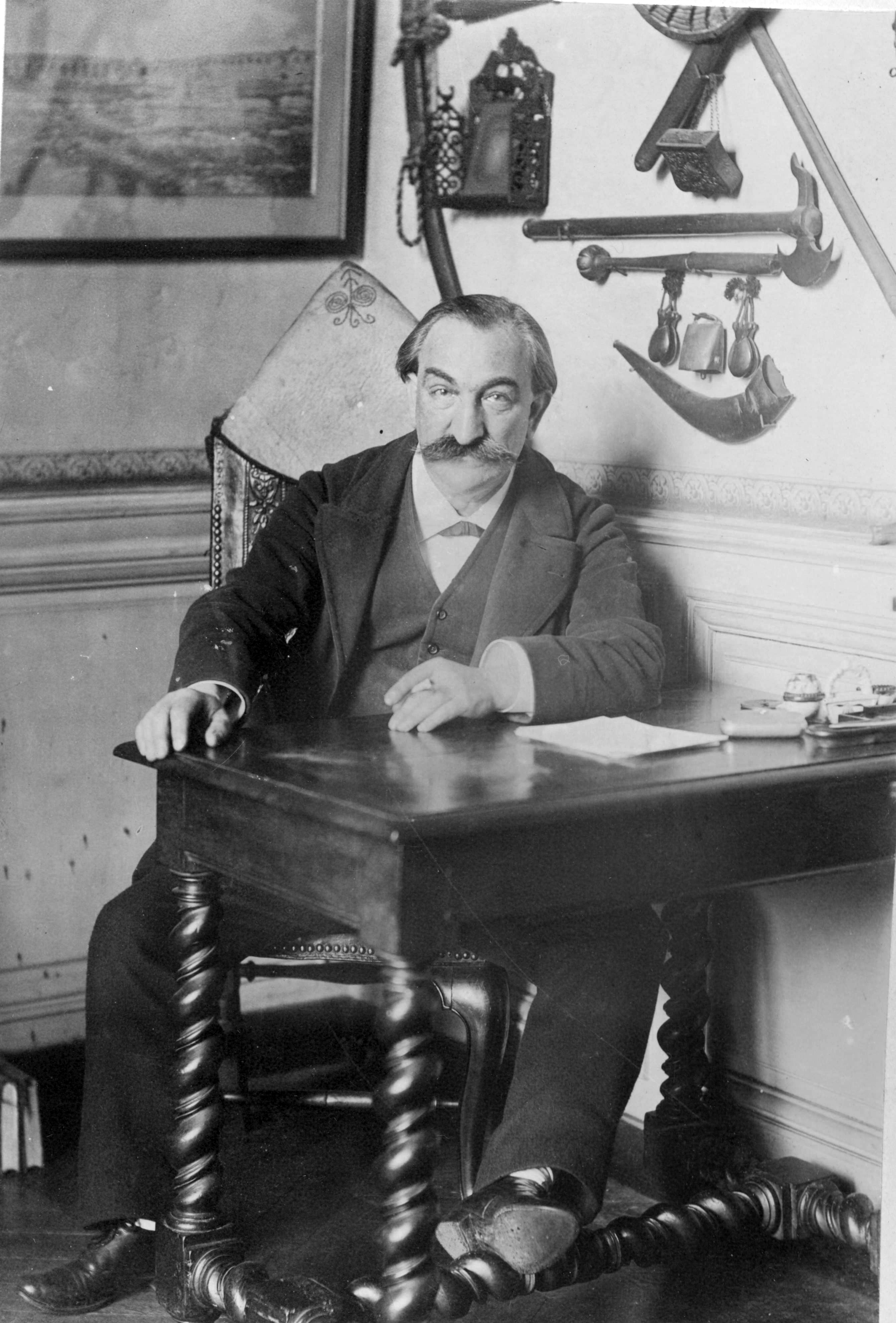
Léon Cahun

David Léon Cahun (23 June 1841 – 30 March 1900) was a French traveler, Orientalist and writer.

== Life ==
Cahun's family, who came originally from Lorraine, destined him for a military career. However, owing to family affairs he was compelled to relinquish this, and he devoted himself to geographical and historical studies. In 1863 he began to publish a series of geographical articles and accounts of his travels in Egypt and neighboring countries in the Revue Française. About the same time he published letters of travel, and a geographical review which was the first of its kind in the daily press. In 1864 Cahun set out to explore Egypt, Nubia, the western coast of the Red Sea, and Asia Minor.

Returning to France in 1866, he became a political writer on the staff of La Liberté. When that paper supported the Empire, Cahun left it, joining the staff of La Réforme (1869) and La Loi. During the Franco-Prussian War he was a correspondent for several papers. On 4 September 1870, he entered the army as a volunteer, and was appointed sublieutenant of the 46th Foot the following November. When peace was established he resumed his Oriental studies, devoting himself chiefly to research concerning the Turks and the Tatars.

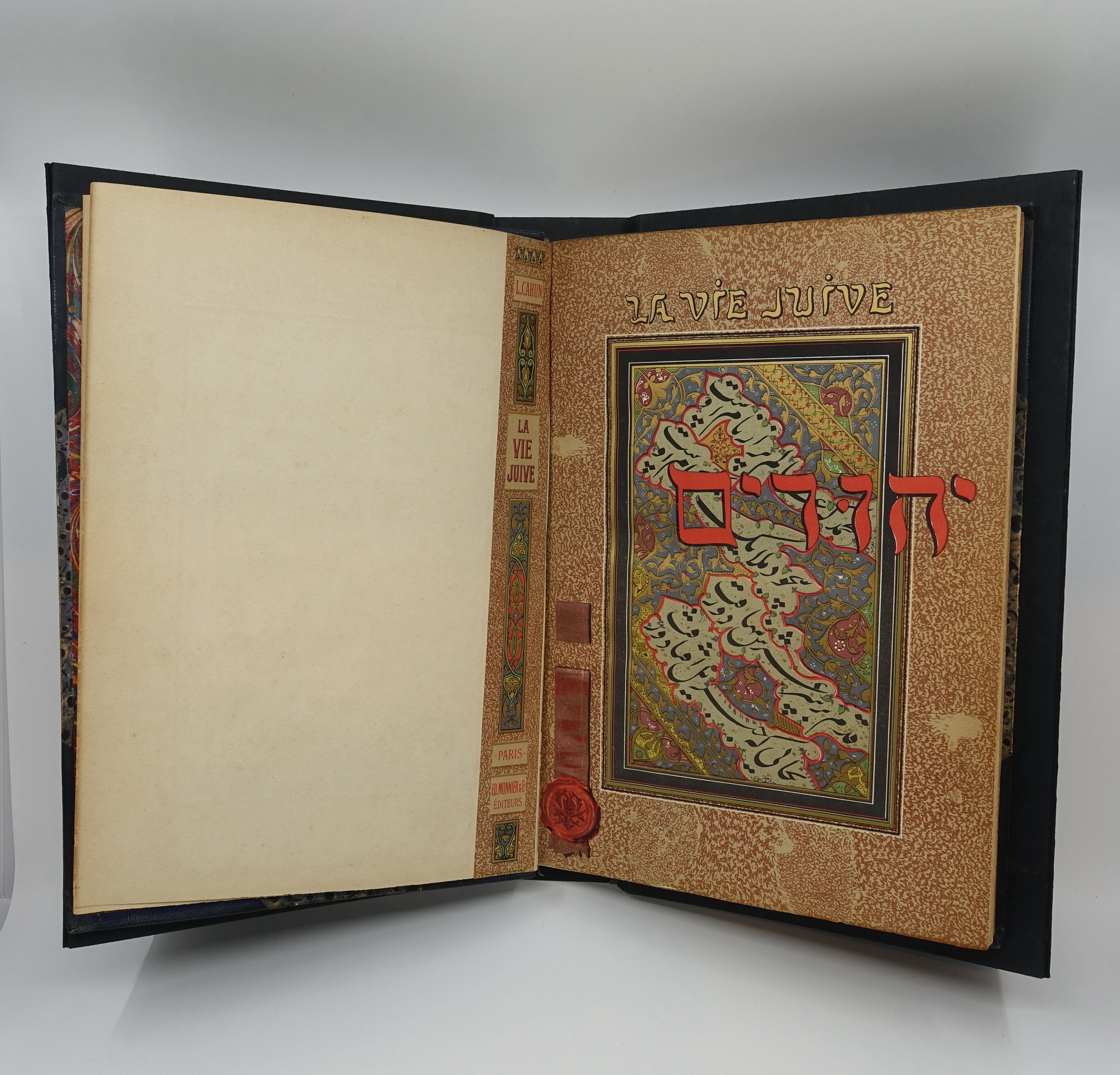
1886 edition of La vie juive, in the collection of the Jewish Museum of Switzerland.

In 1875, he was appointed to the Bibliothèque Mazarine, where he was specially engaged in the compilation of an analytical catalogue from the year 1874. Meanwhile, Cahun had begun to publish a series of historical novels dealing with ancient history, in the style of the journeys of Anacharsis in Greece. They are said by one critic to be written in temperate and pure French, combining interest with genuine archeological knowledge. It was Cahun's intention to present facts of ancient history that were not generally known, and thus make contributions to general history and geography. These novels include: Les Aventures du Capitaine Magon, on Phoenician explorations one thousand years before the common era (Paris, Hachette, 1875); La Bannière Bleue, the adventures of a Muslim, a Christian, and a pagan at the time of the Crusades and the Mongolian conquest (ib. 1876); Les Pilotes d'Ango, dealing with French history in the sixteenth century (ib. 1878); Les Mercenaires, set during the Punic Wars (ib. 1881); Les Rois de Mer, on the Norman invasions (Chasavay, 1887); Hassan le Janissaire, on Turkish military life in the sixteenth century (crowned by the French Academy); La Tueuse, scenes from the Mongol invasion of Hungary in the thirteenth century (1893). Cahun contributed many literary articles to the Revue Bleue, Le Journal des Débats, etc., and several critical, geographical, and ethnographical papers to the Bulletin de la Société d'Ethnographie, Bulletin de la Société Académique Indo-Chinoise Bulletin de la Société Japonaise, Bulletin de la Société Americaine, Bulletin de l'Athénée Oriental, etc.

Exploration of ruins in Syria, from Cahun's 1879 travelogue

In 1878 Cahun set out on a fresh series of journeys accompanied by his wife. The two intrepid travelers visited the Syrian Coastal Mountain Range (1878), the Faroe Islands and Iceland (1879), and central Syria and Mesopotamia (1880). In 1879, the Tour du Monde published an account of his travels through Syria and the mountains of the Ansari people (older term for Alawites) there. He also issued a volume treating the same subject, entitled Excursions sur les Bords de l'Euphrate (Paris, 1884). His scholarly study of local customs, Scènes de la Vie Juive en Alsace, with preface by Zadoc Kahn, chief rabbi of Paris, appeared about the same time (ib. 1885). In 1884 he published Le Congo, la Véridique Description du Royaume Africain, Traduite pour la Première Fois en Français sur l'Edition Latine Faite par les Frères de Bry en 1598, d'Après les Voyages Portugais et Notamment Celui d'Edouard Lopez en 1578 (Brussels, 1884).

In 1890 Cahun established a course of lectures at the Sorbonne, where he taught the history and the geography of Asia. An abstract of one section of this course was incorporated in the Histoire Générale of Lavisse and Rambaud. Cahun's Introduction Générale à l'Histoire de l'Asie (1896), based on material gathered during his travels, is a complete and exact history of that continent. He also undertook the restoration of some ancient casts that are of great geographical interest. Some years before his death Cahun ceased writing for the Parisian periodicals, but to the end he contributed to Le Phare de la Loire. He left an unfinished history of the Arabs, and a historical novel dealing with the same topic. He was a member of several learned societies.

== Family ==
Cahun came from a distinguished family, who traced back its ancestry to the times of Louis IX of France. His nephew, the son of Mathilde Cahun, Marcel Schwob (1867–1905), was a prolific French writer. French photographer and writer Claude Cahun (born Lucy Schwob, 1894–1954) was his great-niece.

== Influences on Turkish nationalism ==
Cahun's novel La Bannière bleue (1877) acted as a major source of inspiration for Turkish nationalist current in the Ottoman Empire and his history work Introduction à l'histoire de l'Asie: Turcs et Mongols des origines à 1405 (1896) had great impact on the nationalistic historiography of the Republican era. Kemal Atatürk, the founder of the Republic had also been an avid reader of Cahun's Introduction à l'histoire de l'Asie which included influence of a Turkish race in the early development of the European civilization.
